= Plays and films of Sacha Guitry =

The French actor, writer, manager and director, Sacha Guitry had a prolific output of plays and films. His stage works range from historical dramas to contemporary light comedies. Some have musical scores, by composers including André Messager and Reynaldo Hahn. During the era of silent films Guitry avoided them, finding the lack of spoken dialogue fatal to dramatic impact. From the 1930s to the end of his life he enthusiastically embraced the cinema, making as many as five films in a single year.

== Theatre ==
- Le Page, opéra-bouffe in one act, music by Ludo Ratz (théâtre des Mathurins, 1902)
- Yves le fou, "pastorale tragique in one act (Pont-Aven, 1903)
- Le KWTZ, "drame passionnel" in one act (théâtre des Capucines, 1905)
- Nono, comedy in three acts (théâtre des Mathurins, 1905)
- Le Cocu qui faillit tout gâter, comedy in one act (théâtre Antoine, 1905)
- Un étrange point d'honneur, comedy in one act and two tableaux (Tréteau-Royal, 4 rue de Caumartin, 1906)
- Chez les Zoaques, comedy in three acts (théâtre Antoine, 1906)
- Les Nuées, comedy in four acts after Aristophanes" (théâtre des Arts, 1906)
- L'Escalier de service ou Dolly, comedy in two acts (casino de Monte-Carlo, 1907)
- La Clef, comedy in four acts (théâtre Réjane, 1907)
- La Partie de dominos, comedy in two acts (Tréteau-Royal, 1907)
- Petite Hollande, comedy in three acts (théâtre de l'Odéon, 1908)
- Le Scandale de Monte-Carlo, comedy in three acts (théâtre du Gymnase, 1908)
- Le Mufle, comedy in two acts (théâtre Antoine, 1908)
- Après, revue in one act (théâtre Michel, 1908)
- Tell père, Tell fils, opéra-bouffe in one act, music by Tiarko Richepin (théâtre Mévisto, 1909)
- La 33e ou Pour épater ta mère, comedy in one act (casino de Trouville, 1909)
- C'te pucelle d'Adèle, comedy in one act and two tableaux (concert de la Gaîté-Rochechouart, 1909)
- Tout est sauvé, fors l'honneur, comedy in one act (théâtre de Moscou, 1910)
- Le Veilleur de nuit, comedy in three acts (théâtre Michel, 1911)
- Mésaventure amoureuse ou l'Argent, comedy in one act (théâtre Femina, 1911)
- Un beau mariage, comedy in three acts (théâtre de la Renaissance, 1911)
- Un type dans le genre de Napoléon, comedy in one act (Automobile Club de France, 1911)
- Jean III ou l'Irrésistible Vocation du fils Mondoucet, comedy in three acts (Comédie-Royale, 1912)
- Pas complet, comedy-bouffe in two acts (théâtre Marigny, 1912)
- La Prise de Berg-Op-Zoom, comedy in four acts (théâtre du Vaudeville, 1912)
- On passe dans trois jours, comedy in one act (1913)
- La Pèlerine écossaise, comedy in three acts (théâtre des Bouffes-Parisiens, 1914)
- Deux couverts, comedy in one act (Comédie-Française, 1914)
- La Jalousie, comedy in three acts (théâtre des Bouffes-Parisiens, 1915)
- Il faut l'avoir!", revue in two acts and a prologue (théâtre du Palais-Royal, 1915)
- Une vilaine femme brune", comedy in one act (théâtre des Variétés, 1915)
- Faisons un rêve", comedy in four acts (théâtre des Bouffes-Parisiens, 1916)
- Jean de La Fontaine", comedy in four acts (théâtre des Bouffes-Parisiens, 1916)
- Un soir quand on est seul", comedy in one act (théâtre des Bouffes-Parisiens, 1917)
- Chez la reine Isabeau", comedy in one act (théâtre des Bouffes-Parisiens, 1917)
- L'Illusionniste, comedy in three acts (théâtre des Bouffes-Parisiens, 1917)
- Deburau, comedy in four acts and a prologue (théâtre du Vaudeville, 1918)
- La Revue de Paris, revue in four acts (théâtre du Vaudeville, 1918)
- Pasteur, play in five acts (théâtre du Vaudeville, 1919)
- Le Mari, la Femme et l'Amant, comedy in three acts (théâtre du Vaudeville, 1919)
- Mon père avait raison, comedy in three acts (théâtre de la Porte-Saint-Martin, 1919)
- Béranger, comedy in three acts and a prologue (théâtre de la Porte-Saint-Martin, 1920)
- Je t'aime, comedy en cinq actes (théâtre Édouard VII, 1920)
- Comment on écrit l'histoire, comedy in two acts (théâtre Sarah-Bernhardt, 1920)
- Le Comédien, comedy in four acts (théâtre Édouard VII, 1921)
- Le Grand Duc, comedy in three acts (théâtre Édouard VII, 1921)
- Jacqueline, play in three acts based on Henri Duvernois (théâtre Édouard VII, 1921)
- Chez Jean de La Fontaine, comedy in one act (Opéra de Paris, 1922)
- Une petite main qui se place, comedy in three acts and an épilogue (théâtre Édouard VII, 1922)
- Le Blanc et le Noir, comedy in four acts (théâtre des Variétés, 1922)
- Un sujet de roman, play in four acts (théâtre Édouard VII, 1923)
- L'Amour masqué, comedy musicale in three acts, music by André Messager (théâtre Édouard VII, 1923)
- Un phénomène, "parade" in one act (théâtre de l'Alhambra, 1923)
- Le Lion et la poule, comedy in three acts (théâtre Édouard VII, 1923)
- L'Accroche-cœur, comedy in three acts (théâtre de l'Étoile, 1923)
- Revue de Printemps, fantaisie-revue in three acts et nineteen tableaux (théâtre de l'Étoile, 1924)
- Une étoile nouvelle, comedy in three acts (théâtre Édouard VII, 1924)
- On ne joue pas pour s'amuser, comedy in five acts (théâtre Édouard VII, 1925)
- Mozart, comedy musicale in three acts, music by Reynaldo Hahn (théâtre Édouard VII, 1925)
- Vive la République !, revue in two acts and twenty tableaux (théâtre Marigny, 1926)
- À vol d'oiseau, revue (théâtre Édouard VII, 1926)
- Était-ce un rêve? ou Une comedy nouvelle, comedy in two acts (1926)
- Désiré, comedy in three acts (théâtre Édouard VII, 1927)
- Un miracle, comedy in four acts (théâtre des Variétés, 1927)
- Mariette ou Comment on écrit l'histoire, musical comedy in four acts, music by Oscar Straus (théâtre Édouard VII, 1928)
- Charles Lindbergh, féerie in three acts and eighteen tableaux (théâtre du Châtelet, 1928)
- Histoires de France, play in fourteen tableaux (théâtre Pigalle, 1929)
- La Troisième Chambre, comedy in four acts after Albert Willemetz (théâtre de la Madeleine, 1929)
- Chez George Washington, à Mount Vernon, sketch in one act, music by Henri Büsser (théâtre des Champs-Élysées, 1930)
- Et vive le théâtre, revue in two acts and fifteen tableaux (théâtre de la Madeleine, 1930)
- Deauville sous Napoléon III, sketch in one act (théâtre Pigalle, 1930)
- Frans Hals ou l'Admiration, comedy in three acts (théâtre de la Madeleine, 1931)
- Sa dernière volonté ou l'Optique du théâtre, comedy in two acts (théâtre de la Madeleine, 1931)
- Une revue (Exposition de Noirs) ou La Revue coloniale, revue in one act (théâtre de la Madeleine, 1931)
- Un chagrin ou Chagrin d'amour, "prétexte musical" in one act (1931)
- Monsieur Prudhomme a-t-il vécu?, play in two acts (théâtre de la Madeleine, 1931)
- Villa à vendre, comedy in one act (théâtre de la Madeleine, 1931)
- La SADMP, opéra-bouffe in one act, music by Louis Beydts (théâtre de la Madeleine, 1931)
- Tout commence par des chansons, sketch in one act (Moulin de la chanson, 1931)
- Mon double et ma moitié, comedy in three acts (Théâtre de la Madeleine, 1931)
- Les Desseins de la providence, comedy in two acts (Théâtre de la Madeleine, 1932)
- Le Voyage de Tchong-Li, "légende" in three tableaux (Théâtre de la Madeleine, 1932)
- Françoise, play in three acts (Théâtre de la Madeleine, 1932)
- La Nuit d'avril, sketch in one act in verse (Théâtre de la Madeleine, 1932)
- Châteaux en Espagne, comedy in four acts (Théâtre des Variétés, 1933)
- Adam et Ève, play in two tableaux (Comédie-Française, 1933)
- Ô mon bel inconnu, musical comedy in three acts, music by Reynaldo Hahn (théâtre des Bouffes-Parisiens, 1933)
- Maîtresses de rois, fantasy in five tableaux (Casino de Paris, 1933)
- Un tour au paradis, comedy in four acts (Théâtre de la Michodière, 1933)
- Le Renard et la Grenouille, comedy in one act (Théâtre de la Michodière, 1933)
- Florestan Ier, prince de Monaco, opérette in three acts and six tableaux, music by Werner R. Heymann (théâtre des Variétés, 1933)
- L’École des philosophes, sketch in one act (Palais des beaux-arts de Bruxelles, 1933)
- Son père et lui, play en quatre tableaux (Opéra de Lyon, 1934)
- Le Nouveau Testament, comedy in four acts (théâtre de la Madeleine, 1934)
- Mon ami Pierrot, "légende musicale" in one act and deux tableaux, music by Sam Barlow (Opéra-Comique, 1935)
- Quand jouons-nous la comedy?, comedy in three acts, a prologue and an épilogue (théâtre de la Madeleine, 1935)
- La Fin du monde, comedy in five acts (théâtre de la Madeleine, 1935)
- Le Saut périlleux, drama in one act (New York, 1936)
- Geneviève, comedy in five acts (théâtre de la Madeleine, 1936)
- Le Mot de Cambronne, comedy in one act in verse (théâtre de la Madeleine, 1936)
- Crions-le sur les toits, "revue publicitaire" in two acts and fifteen tableaux, music by Arthur Honegger, Adolphe Borchard and Guy Lafarge (théâtre des Champs-Élysées, 1937)
- Quadrille, comedy in six acts (théâtre de la Madeleine, 1937)
- Dieu sauve le Roi, sketch in one act (palais de l’Élysée, 1938)
- Un monde fou, comedy in four acts (théâtre de la Madeleine, 1938)
- You're Telling Me (ou Honi soit qui mal y pense), "franco-anglais" sketch in one act (London, 1939)
- Une paire de gifles, comedy in one act (1939)
- Une lettre bien tapée, comedy in one act (1939)
- Fausse Alerte, sketch in one act (1939)
- Florence, comedy in three acts and a prologue (Théâtre de la Madeleine, 1939)
- L’École du mensonge, comedy in one act (ABC de Genève, 1940)
- Cigales et Fourmis, sketch in one act (Cercle interallié, 1940)
- Le Bien-Aimé, comedy in three acts "but in several tableaux" (Théâtre de la Madeleine, 1940)
- Mon auguste grand-père ou La Preuve par sept, comedy in five acts (1941)
- Vive l'Empereur ! ou le Soir d'Austerlitz, comedy in five acts (théâtre de la Madeleine, 1941)
- N'écoutez pas, mesdames !, comedy in three acts (théâtre de la Madeleine, 1942)
- Courteline au travail, sketch in one act (Comédie-Française, 1943)
- Je sais que tu es dans la salle, sketch in one act (Comédie-Française, 1943)
- Dix mots d'anglais, comedy "en several actes"(1946)
- Talleyrand ou le Diable boiteux, play in three acts and nine tableaux (théâtre Édouard VII, 1948)
- Aux deux colombes, comedy in three acts (théâtre des Variétés, 1948)
- Toâ, comedy in four acts (théâtre du Gymnase, 1949)
- Tu m'as sauvé la vie, comedy in four acts (théâtre des Variétés, 1949)
- Beaumarchais, comedy in two acts and nineteen tableaux (1950)
- Constance, revised version of Quand jouons-nous la comédie? (1935). Not produced. (1950)
- Une folie, revised version of Un monde fou (théâtre des Variétés, 1951)
- Palsambleu, comedy in four acts (théâtre des Variétés, 1953)
- Madame Bergeret, play in one act and two tableaux (1960, posth.)

== Film ==
Except where otherwise stated, Guitry took part in all his films as director, screenplay writer, dialogue writer, and actor.

- Oscar rencontre Mademoiselle Mamageot – short silent, not publicly released (1914)
- Ceux de chez nous ("Those of our home") – silent, celebrating eminent French men and women (1915)
- Une petite main qui se place – short silent (1922)
- Dîner de gala aux ambassadeurs – short documentary (1934)
- Pasteur – co-director Fernand Rivers (1935)
- Good Luck (Bonne chance !) (1935)
- Indiscretions (1936)
- Confessions of a Cheat (Le Roman d'un tricheur) (1936)
- Mon père avait raison (1936)
- Let's Make a Dream (1936)
- Le Mot de Cambronne (1937)
- Désiré (1937)
- The Pearls of the Crown (Les Perles de la couronne) (1937)
- Quadrille (1938)
- Remontons les Champs-Élysées (Let's Go Up The Champs-Élysées) (1938)
- Nine Bachelors (1939)
- Mlle. Desiree (1941)
- La Loi du 21 juin 1907 (1942)
- De Jeanne d'Arc à Philippe Pétain (1943)
- My Last Mistress (1943)
- La Malibran (1943)
- The Private Life of an Actor (1947)
- The Lame Devil (Le Diable boiteux) (1948)
- Aux deux colombes (1949)
- Toâ (1949)
- Tu m'as sauvé la vie (1950)
- The Treasure of Cantenac (1950)
- Deburau (1951)
- La Poison (1951)
- Je l'ai été trois fois (1952)
- La Vie d'un honnête homme (1953)
- The Virtuous Scoundrel – as narrator (1953)
- Royal Affairs in Versailles (Si Versailles m'était conté) (1953)
- Napoléon (1955)
- If Paris Were Told to Us (Si Paris nous était conté) (1955)
- Lovers and Thieves (Assassins et Voleurs) – does not act (1957)
- Three Make a Pair (Les Trois font la paire) – last appearance, but only during credits (1957)
- Life Together (La Vie à deux, 1958) – screenplay only
