= Michel Nastorg =

French actor

- Born: 2 October 1914; France
- Died: 9 June 1984 (aged 69); France
- Occupation: Actor
- Years active: 1946-1961

Michel Nastorg (1914–1984) was a French actor.

During World War II he was called into the French army as Soldier Second Class. With the Seventh Army he retreated from Belgium before a fierce German onslaught, and found himself at Dunkirk in June 1940. On 1 June he and other French soldiers embarked on the Scotia which was almost immediately sunk by a German Stuka. Nastorg was rescued by a British destroyer which discharged him at Dover. He was then returned to France in two weeks time.

== Partial filmography ==
- Gosse de riche (1936)
- Messieurs Ludovic (1946) - Le secrétaire de Le Chartier (uncredited)
- Cyrano de Bergerac (1946) - Le Bret
- Le diamant de cent sous (1948)
- The Lame Devil (1948) - Un laquais (uncredited)
- The Nude Woman (1949) - Le peintre
- Toâ (1949) - René
- Sweet Madness (1951)
- Sans laisser d'adresse (1951) - Un client
- Sous le ciel de Paris (1951) - Un examinateur (uncredited)
- Sins of Madeleine (1951)
- Une histoire d'amour (1951) - Petit rôle (uncredited)
- La Poison (1951) - Le brigadier
- Monsieur Leguignon, Signalman (1952) - L'homme qui écoute la radio (uncredited)
- Agence matrimoniale (1952) - Le notaire
- The Nude Dancer (1952) - Michel
- She and Me (1952) - Monsieur Capulet - le père de Colette (uncredited)
- The Virtuous Scoundrel (1953) - Le mécanicien
- Soyez les bienvenus (1953) - Michaud
- Captain Pantoufle (1953) - Le vendeur du 'Garage du centre' (uncredited)
- Mandat d'amener (1953) - Le prêtre
- This Man Is Dangerous (1953) - Govas
- Royal Affairs in Versailles (1954) - Un serviteur (uncredited)
- Adam Is Eve (1954) - Le maître d'hôtel
- Napoléon (1955) - Masséna (uncredited)
- Papa, maman, ma femme et moi (1955) - Me Vandalle - de Cambrai (uncredited)
- Blackmail (1955) - Le musicien
- Cherchez la femme (1955)
- Les Aristocrates (1955) - Un visiteur (uncredited)
- Les Mémoires d'un flic (1955) - Un homme de la cour (uncredited)
- La Bande à papa (1956) - Le directeur de la police judiciaire (uncredited)
- Les carottes sont cuites (1956)
- La Peau de l'ours (1957) - Le médecin-légiste
- Donnez-moi ma chance (1957) - Un producteur
- Les Truands (1957) - Le maire
- Rafles sur la ville (1958) - Le directeur de la prison (uncredited)
- Young Sinners (1958) - Le père de Bob
- Marche ou crève (1960) - Meyer
- Thunder in the Blood (1960)
- The President (1961) - Un parlementaire
- Un cheval pour deux (1962) - Jean-Pierre
- Un drôle de paroissien (1963)
- Monsieur (1964) - Le docteur
- Les Aventures de Salavin (1964)
- The Gorillas (1964) - (uncredited)
- Circus Angel (1965) - M. de Montsouris
- The Gardener of Argenteuil (1966) - Le voyageur de commerce
- Le Soleil des voyous (1967) - Coulomb (uncredited)
- Le Cinéma de papa (1971) - Le directeur du cinéma (uncredited)
