= Georges Spanelly =

French actor

Georges Spanelly (1899–1979) was a French actor. In 1948 he starred in the film The Lame Devil under Sacha Guitry.

== Filmography ==
Year	Title	Role	Notes
1931	L'amour à l'américaine		Uncredited
1934	Les Nuits moscovites	Un officier	Uncredited
1935	Carnival in Flanders		Voice
1936	Life Belongs to Us	Le directeur de l'usine	
1936	Rubber	Ravinsky	
1937	Double Crime in the Maginot Line	Lennard	
1938	The Time of the Cherries	Le directeur	
1938	La Marseillaise	La Chesnaye	
1938	La Bête Humaine	Camy-Lamotte, le secrétaire de Grandmorin	Uncredited
1942	Le Destin fabuleux de Désirée Clary	Davout	
1943	Des jeunes filles dans la nuit		
1944	La Malibran	Le directeur	Uncredited
1948	The Lame Devil	Le comte de Montrond	
1950	The Treasure of Cantenac	L'architecte	
1952	My Husband Is Marvelous		
1954	Royal Affairs in Versailles	Un seigneur	Uncredited
1955	Napoléon		
1956	If Paris Were Told to Us	Bourgoin	
1959	Asphalte		
1959	La Bête à l'affût		Uncredited
1973	The Train	Le vieux du château d'eau	(final film role)
