= Léon Walther =

French actor (1874–1973)

- Born: Léon Valadier; 2 June 1874; Sorgues (Vaucluse)
- Died: 2 March 1973 (aged 98); Lagny
- Occupations: Film and stage actor

Léon Walther (2 June 1874 – 2 March 1973) was a French film and stage actor who played on numerous occasions in Sacha Guitry's films and plays.

== Filmography ==
- 1935: Odette / Déchéance by Jacques Houssin – Count Hubert de Clermont-Latour
- 1937: The Pearls of the Crown by Sacha Guitry and Christian-Jaque – Anne de Montmorency
- 1938: Remontons les Champs-Élysées by Sacha Guitry and Robert Bibal – a lord
- 1939: Nine Bachelors by Sacha Guitry – Le maître d'hôtel
- 1941: Le fabuleux destin de Désirée Clary by Sacha Guitry – Count Morner
- 1941: Madame Sans-Gêne by Roger Richebé – Despréaux
- 1941: Ne bougez plus by Pierre Caron – Le grand chambellan
- 1942: Prince Charming by Jean Boyer – Count Danrémont
- 1942: The Guardian Angel by Jacques de Casembroot – Molignon
- 1942: Une étoile au soleil by André Zwoboda – Adalbert de Merlerault
- 1943: My Last Mistress by Sacha Guitry – the physician
- 1943: La Malibran by Sacha Guitry
- 1943: La vie de plaisir by Albert Valentin – Célestin
- 1945: As Long as I Live by Jacques de Baroncelli
- 1946: Roger la Honte by André Cayatte – the president of the court
- 1946: La femme en rouge by Louis Cuny – Le directeur des beaux-arts
- 1947: Le Comédien by Sacha Guitry – Aubril
- 1948: The Lame Devil by Sacha Guitry – a physician
- 1949: Monseigneur de Roger Richebé – the majordome
- 1949: The Treasure of Cantenac by Sacha Guitry
- 1951: La Poison by Sacha Guitry – the prosecutor
- 1952: The Call of Destiny by Georges Lacombe – the critic
- 1952: The Virtuous Scoundrel by Sacha Guitry – Maître Denisot, le notaire
- 1953: The Earrings of Madame de… by Max Ophüls – L'administrateur
- 1953: Royal Affairs in Versailles de Sacha Guitry – Lévêque de Paris
- 1954: Le Comte de Monte-Cristo by Robert Vernay – film shot in two periods – a courtier
- 1954: Napoléon by Sacha Guitry
- 1955: If Paris Were Told to Us by Sacha Guitry – the man addressing Beaumarchais

== Theatre ==
- 1942: N'écoutez pas, mesdames ! by Sacha Guitry, directed by the author, Théâtre de la Madeleine
- 1950: Harvey de Mary Chase, directed by Marcel Achard, Théâtre Antoine
- 1951: Harvey de Mary Chase, directed by Marcel Achard, Théâtre des Célestins
- 1952: N'écoutez pas, mesdames ! by Sacha Guitry, directed by the author, Théâtre des Variétés
