= Jacques Varennes =

French actor (1894–1958)

- Born: 8 November 1894; Mantes-la-Jolie, Yvelines, France
- Died: 6 September 1958 (aged 63); Paris, France
- Other name: Louis André
- Occupation: Actor
- Years active: 1908 - 1959 (film)

Jacques Varennes (6 September 1894 – 8 November 1958) was a French film actor who appeared in around seventy films during his career. He appeared in Maurice Tourneur's 1938 historical film The Patriot.

== Selected filmography ==
- The Lovers of Midnight (1931) - Gaston Bouchard
- The Devil's Holiday (1931) - Charlie Thorne
- Fra Diavolo (1931) - Viani
- When Love Is Over (1931) - Robert Fournier
- Le disparu de l'ascenseur (1932) - Alfred Tortoran
- Criez-le sur les toits (1932)
- Antoinette (1932) - M. de Saurin
- The House of Mystery (1933) - Henri Corradin
- Une nuit de folies (1934) - Julot
- Chansons de Paris (1934) - Bermasse
- Brevet 95-75 (1934) - Pierre Violey
- Little Jacques (1934) - Daniel Mortal
- Le bossu (1934) - Le prince de Gonzague
- Jim la houlette (1935) - Maitre Clisson
- Le bébé de l'escadron (1935)
- Un soir de bombe (1935) - Paulo
- Un de la légion (1936) - Durand
- La joueuse d'orgue (1936) - Robert Bernier
- Enfants de Paris (1937)
- La tour de Nesle (1937) - Jehan Buridan
- L'affaire du courrier de Lyon (1937) - Le président Gohier
- The Fraudster (1937) - Jacques
- The Innocent (1938) - Le docteur
- Un meurtre a été commis (1938) - Le Jouyeux
- Gosse de riche (1938) - Chassigny
- The Patriot (1938) - Panine
- Prince Bouboule (1939) - Stanik
- Fric-Frac (1939) - Tintin
- Une main a frappé (1939) - Mérignan
- Personal Column (1939) - Maxime
- Saturnin de Marseille (1941) - Le beau-père
- Sins of Youth (1941) - Firmin, le maître d'hôtel
- Nadia la femme traquée (1942) - Rouaumont
- The Duchess of Langeais (1942) - Le duc de Langeais
- The Guardian Angel (1942) - Tirandier
- Le Destin fabuleux de Désirée Clary (1943) - Bernadotte
- Monsieur des Lourdines (1943) - La Marzelière
- Don't Shout It from the Rooftops (1943) - Octave
- Les Roquevillard (1943) - Maître Frasne
- Finance noire (1943) - Le préfet de police
- Vautrin (1943) - Grandville
- La Malibran (1944) - La Fayette
- Pamela (1945) - Rochecotte
- Échec au roy (1945) - Le duc de Montgobert
- The Eagle with Two Heads (1948) - Comte de Foehn
- The Lame Devil (1948) - Le général de La Fayette
- Les casse-pieds (1948)
- Orpheus (1950) - Judge
- Murders (1950) - Hervé Annequin
- Darling Caroline (1951) - Le marquis de Bièvre / Duke
- La Poison (1951) - Le procureur
- Le chemin de la drogue (1952) - Garbo
- Mandat d'amener (1953) - Le procureur général
- Royal Affairs in Versailles (1954) - Colbert (uncredited)
- On Trial (1954) - Le juge d'instruction
- The Red and the Black (1954) - Le président du tribunal
- Les Diaboliques (1955) - M. Bridoux, professeur
- Napoleon (1955) - Boissy d'Anglas (uncredited)
- Une fille épatante (1955) - Le Président
- Maid in Paris (1956)
- If Paris Were Told to Us (1956) - Scherer
- Les carottes sont cuites (1956)
- Lovers and Thieves (1956) - Le président des Assises
- L'étrange Monsieur Steve (1957) - Arthur - le valet de chambre
- Quay of Illusions (1959) - (final film role)

== Bibliography ==
- Waldman, Harry. Maurice Tourneur: The Life and Films. McFarland, 2001.
