= Je l'ai été trois fois =

- Directed by: Sacha Guitry
- Written by: Sacha Guitry; Jean Duché
- Produced by: François Chavane; Alain Poiré; Paul Wagner
- Starring: Sacha Guitry; Louis de Funès
- Cinematography: Pierre Bachelet
- Edited by: Raymond Lamy
- Music by: Louiguy
- Production companies: Gaumont; Cinéphonic
- Distributed by: Gaumont Distribution
- Release date: 31 October 1952 (France)
- Running time: 90 minutes
- Country: France
- Language: French

Je l'ai été trois fois (French: I Was Three Times), is a French comedy film from 1952, directed by Sacha Guitry, written by Sacha Guitry, starring Sacha Guitry and Louis de Funès. The English international title of this film is "She and Me".

== Plot ==
Jean Renneval, a seasoned actor, is having an affair with the wife of a wealthy merchant. When he is required to perform as a clergyman, he visits her while still in costume. This is when the deceived husband encounters them together. Renneval attempts to defuse the situation by claiming he is an actual clergyman, but this action leads to further complications for him.

== Cast ==
- Sacha Guitry as Jean Renneval
- Louis de Funès as the interpreter-secretary of the sultan of Hammanlif
- Bernard Blier as Henri Verdier, jeweller - Hector Van Broken, look-alike of Henry
- Lana Marconi as Thérèse Verdier, Henri's third wife
- Simone Paris as Lucie Verdier, Henri's first wife
- Meg Lemonnier as Henriette Le Havray, friend of Thérèse
- Solange Varennes as Juliette Verdier, the seconde spouse of Henri
- Pauline Carton as Mme Dutiquesnois, Jean Renneval's dresser
- Ginette Taffin as Julie
- Primerose Perret as Andrée, a girl
- Janine Camp as Suzette, another girl
- Jacques Eyser as the Sultan of Hammanlif
- Henri Arius as the doctor Marinier
- Jacques Anquetil as the elevator operator
- Sophie Mallet as Zoé
- Christine Darbel as actress
- Jean Chevrier: a man in front of the hotel
- Lucien Callamand as un monsieur
- Roger Poirier as the manager and a bodyguard
