= Henry Laverne =

French actor, comedian, humorist and singer (1890-1953)

- Born: Henri Allum c. 1888; Boulogne-sur-Mer, France
- Died: 4 September 1953 (aged 64–65)
- Citizenship: French
- Occupations: Stage actor, Film actor, Comedian, Humorist and Occasional Singer

Henry Laverne (born Henri Allum; 1888 or 1890 – 4 September 1953) was a French stage and film actor; Laverne was also a comedian and humorist for a decade, as well as a singer on occasion. As an actor, he was usually billed Henry-Laverne in his time (later Henri Laverne) and starred in about twenty films and plays; credits include six films and plays from Sacha Guitry, such as The Lame Devil (1948). As a comedian, he was one half of then-famous comic duo Bach and Laverne (1928–1938; Bach et Laverne in French); one of their 157 comedy sketches was adapted as the lyrics to Ray Ventura's hit comedy song "Tout va très bien, Madame la Marquise" (1935; lit. "All is very well, Madam the Marchioness").

== Biography ==
Henry Laverne was born Henri Allum in 1888 or 1890 at Boulogne-sur-Mer, France.

== Filmography ==
Year	Title	Role	Notes
1918	Les bleus de l'amour'	Alfred Brunin	
1930	Lévy et Cie		
1930	Le tampon du capiston	Capitaine Reverchon	
1931	Y'en a pas deux comme Angélique	Socrate Berlingot	
1931	Le lit conjugal	Laroze	
1932	Adhémar Lampiot		
1933	Bariole		
1934	Casanova	Leduc	
1934	L'article 382 (1934)		
1948	The Lame Devil	Le roi Louis XVIII	
1949	Keep an Eye on Amelia	Le cocher de fiacre	
1949	Mademoiselle de la Ferté	Le professeur	
1950	The Treasure of Cantenac	Pierre	
1951	Deburau	L'aboyeur	
1951	Monsieur Fabre	Le maire	
1951	La poison	Le président	
1952	Massacre in Lace		(final film role)
