= Yvonne Hébert =

French actress

- Born: 2 January 1902; Paris, France
- Died: 15 January 1990 (aged 88); Paris, France
- Occupation: Actress
- Years active: 1931–1971 (film & TV)

Yvonne Hébert (January 2, 1902 - January 15, 1990) was a French stage and film actress. During the 1930s she was cast in several French version of Multiple-language version films. She generally played supporting roles and later in her career appeared in television.

== Selected filmography ==
- The Night at the Hotel (1932)
- To Live Happily (1932)
- Take Care of Amelie (1932)
- Côte d'Azur (1932)
- Un homme sans nom (1932)
- Quick (1932)
- Chourinette (1934)
- Jonny, haute-couture (1935)
- Sarati the Terrible (1937)
- The Lame Devil (1948)
- Cage of Girls (1949)
- The Treasure of Cantenac (1950)
- Murders (1950)
- Poison (1951)
- Monsieur Octave (1951)
- Deburau (1951)

== Bibliography ==
- Crisp, Colin. French Cinema—A Critical Filmography: Volume 1, 1929-1939. Indiana University Press, 2015.
- Goble, Alan. The Complete Index to Literary Sources in Film. Walter de Gruyter, 1999.
