= N'écoutez pas, mesdames! =

1942 three-act comedy by Sacha Guitry

N'écoutez pas, mesdames! (Don't Listen, Ladies!) is a three-act comedy by Sacha Guitry, premiered at the Théâtre de la Madeleine on 23 May 1942.

== Original cast ==
- Sacha Guitry : Daniel Bacheley
- Hélène Perdrière : Madeleine Bacheley
- Jeanne Fusier-Gir : Julie Bille-en-bois
- Léon Walther : le baron de Charançay

== Revivals ==
The play was given as Don't Listen, Ladies at the St James's Theatre, London, in September 1948 with a cast including Francis Lister, Constance Cummings, Denholm Elliott and Betty Marsden, and at the Booth Theatre, Broadway, in December 1948 with a cast headed by Jack Buchanan.
