= The Treasure of Cantenac =

1950 French comedy film

- Directed by: Sacha Guitry
- Written by: Sacha Guitry
- Starring: Sacha Guitry; Lana Marconi; Michel Lemoine
- Cinematography: Noël Ramettre
- Edited by: Gabriel Rongier; Andrée Sélignac
- Music by: Louiguy
- Production company: B.M.P. Films
- Release date: 6 September 1950
- Running time: 105 minutes
- Country: France
- Language: French

The Treasure of Cantenac (French: Le trésor de Cantenac) is a 1950 French comedy film directed by Sacha Guitry and starring Guitry, Lana Marconi and Michel Lemoine. The film's sets were designed by the art director René Renoux.

== Cast ==
- Sacha Guitry as le baron de Cantenac et le conteur
- Lana Marconi as Virginie Lacassagne
- Michel Lemoine as Paul Pidoux
- Marcel Simon as le centenaire
- René Génin as le maire et le curé
- Pauline Carton as Eulalie, la bonne du curé
- Jeanne Fusier-Gir as Mme Lacassagne, la mercière
- Fernand René as Anselme Fortune, le poivrot
- Roger Legris as l'idiot du village
- Milly Mathis as Madeleine, la patronne du café
- Paul Demange as Jean, le mari de Madeleine
- Henry Laverne as Pierre, l'amant de Madeleine
- Solange Varenne as Sidonie, la bergère
- Claire Brilletti as Blanche, la nourrice
- Maximilienne as Blandine, la petite-fille du centenaire
- Germaine Duard as Marie, la servante du baron
- Luce Fabiole as Léonie
- Yvonne Hébert as Thérèse
- Sophie Mallet as Claire
- Marthe Sarbel as Zoé
- Laure Paillette as Lucie
- Aziza Ali as la romanichelle
- Bob Roucoules as le docteur
- Robert Seller as Isidore
- Jacques de Féraudy as Simon
- Pierre Juvenet as Urbain
- André Numès Fils as Gustave
- Roger Poirier as Auguste
- Georges Bever as Bernard
- Léon Walther as Firmin
- Jacques Sablon as Prosper
- René Gréthen as Onésime
- Courtet as Elisée
- Varougeanne as le gitan
- Fouassin as l'unijambiste
- Georges Spanelly as l'architecte
- Jacques Hérisson
- Laverne Fils
- Alex Madis

== Bibliography ==
- Keit, Alain. Le cinéma de Sacha Guitry: vérités, représentations, simulacres. Editions du CEFAL, 1999.
