= Robert Seller =

French film and stage actor (1889–1967)

- Born: 1 August 1889; Paris, France
- Died: 17 August 1967 (aged 78); Fréjus, France
- Resting place: Cimetière parisien de Bagneux
- Occupation: Actor
- Writing career
- Years active: 1930–1963

Robert Seller (1 August 1889 – 17 August 1967) was a French stage and film actor.

Also known by his surname, Seller began his film career in 1931 in Maurice de Canonge's film, Olive se marie. He had parts in many films and plays by Sacha Guitry, including Deburau, Tu m'as sauvé la vie, Le Trésor de Cantenac and Toâ.

== Selected filmography ==
- Love and Luck (1932)
- Chotard and Company (1933)
- Zouzou (1934)
- The Hortensia Sisters (1935)
- Count Obligado (1935)
- Excursion Train (1936)
- Adventure in Paris (1936)
- Taras Bulba (1936)
- The Lover of Madame Vidal (1936)
- Ménilmontant (1936)
- Let's Make a Dream (1936)
- The Two Boys (1936)
- The Pearls of the Crown (1937)
- The Green Jacket (1937)
- Monsieur Bégonia (1937)
- Double Crime in the Maginot Line (1937)
- Josette (1937)
- Clodoche (1938)
- The Patriot (1938)
- Mollenard (1938)
- Monsieur Breloque Has Disappeared (1938)
- Prince Bouboule (1939)
- Deputy Eusèbe (1939)
- The Man Who Seeks the Truth (1940)
- Volpone (1941)
- Happy Go Lucky (1946)
- Jericho (1946)
- Goodbye Darling (1946)
- Special Mission (1946)
- Destiny Has Fun (1947)
- Clockface Café (1947)
- Judicial Error (1948)
- The Lame Devil (1948)
- Two Doves (1949)
- Toâ (1949)
- The Treasure of Cantenac (1950)
- Casimir (1950)
- Adhémar (1951)
- Monsieur Octave (1951)
- Deburau (1951)
- Darling Caroline (1951)
- A Girl on the Road (1952)
- Love in the Vineyard (1952)
- Twelve Hours of Happiness (1952)
- The Crime of Bouif (1952)
- The Lady of the Camellias (1953)
- My Childish Father (1953)
- A Woman's Treasure (1953)
- Le Secret d'Hélène Marimon (1954)
- Mademoiselle from Paris (1955)
- The Duratons (1955)
- Suspicion (1956)
- Paris, Palace Hotel (1956)
- Suspicion (1956)
- How to Succeed in Love (1962)

== Bibliography ==
- Crisp, C.G. The classic French cinema, 1930-1960. Indiana University Press, 1993
