= The Lame Devil (film) =

1948 film by Sacha Guitry

- French: Le Diable boiteux
- Directed by: Sacha Guitry
- Written by: Sacha Guitry
- Based on: Talleyrand by Sacha Guitry
- Produced by: Jean Mugeli
- Starring: Sacha Guitry; Lana Marconi; Émile Drain; Henry Laverne; Maurice Teynac
- Narrated by: Sacha Guitry
- Cinematography: Nicolas Toporkoff
- Edited by: Jeannette Berton
- Music by: Louis Beydts
- Production company: Union Cinématographique Lyonnaise (UCIL)
- Distributed by: Compagnie Parisienne de Location de Films, Gaumont
- Release date: 29 September 1948
- Running time: 125 minutes
- Country: France
- Language: French

The Lame Devil (UK: The Devil Who Limped; original title: Le Diable boiteux, French for "the devil with a limp") is a 1948 French black-and-white historical film written and directed by Sacha Guitry. A biography of the titular French diplomat Talleyrand (1754–1838), it stars Guitry in the lead role. Originally forbidden by the French censor and turned into a play, the film went on to be released into six languages.

== Film ==
=== Description ===
The film is a 125-minute, black-and-white biography of French priest and diplomat Charles Maurice de Talleyrand-Périgord (1754–1838), who served for 50 years under five different French regimes: the Absolute Monarchy, the Revolution, the Consulate, the Empire, and the Constitutional Monarchy. Its title comes from one of the main historical nicknames for Talleyrand, that he shares with demon king Asmodeus and English poet Lord Byron.

The movie is often noted for its opening sequence: after showing the birthplace of Talleyrand as it became in then-contemporary 1948 Paris, it moves to a bookstore window showcasing his main biographies, including a copy of Guitry's own Le Diable boiteux that creates a mise en abyme.

The film then sketches Talleyrand through a dozen episodes and anecdotes, both from his public life as a politician and his private side as a womanizer. Guitry explained that he peppered the dialogues with "a very great number" of quotes from most historical figures depicted.

=== Production ===
Under French law, a film has to be presented to the Censorship Board (commission de censure) in order to obtain a French film-license (visa d'exploitation). During the French Fourth Republic (1946–1958), post-war regulations mandated that a movie script be submitted for approval even before filming.

As explained by Guitry in 1948, his synopsis was originally rejected by the Board: they underlined various dialogues in the script as being liable to cause public outrage. Guitry scoffed that all of them were actual quotes he had lifted from Talleyrand, Napoleon, and other historical figures, but his film being in effect forbidden, he immediately adapted it into a play, Talleyrand (1948). He then leveraged the fact that his play had received success and caused no trouble to re-submit his script to the Board, who granted its license though "without any good grace".

=== Reception ===
Le Diable boiteux was originally released on 29 September 1948 in two theaters (the Marignan and the Marivaux) in Paris, France. It has since been released (dubbed or subtitled) into at least 5 other languages, being alphabetically: English (The Lame Devil), Finnish (Rampa paholainen), Greek (Pringips talleyrandos), Italian (Il diavolo zoppo), and Portuguese (Um Homem Diabólico).

Positive or negative, critics have often considered Guitry's movie to be as much a historical biography as a plea for himself or a self-defense. Because Guitry didn't stop writing and playing during the Nazi occupation of France, he had been accused of collaboration with the enemy and imprisoned two months in 1944 by a self-appointed militia; released by the new government and fully discharged in 1947, he had expressed regret at the absence of a formal trial. Thus, rehabilitating the controversial Talleyrand (often considered a traitor for serving five different regimes) was seen as Guitry also trying to rehabilitate himself and strike back at those who had criticised him: on the movie's release, both a negative review by author Léon Treich (in L'Ordre, 1948) and a positive one by author René Barjavel (in France Hebdomadaire, 1948) commented on it from that standpoint. Various later reviews have discussed that aspect of the movie, from TV listings magazine Télérama (1978) to author Noël Simsolo in Cahiers du cinéma (1988), long after the events.

According to French stage director and stage historian Jacques Lorcey in his 800-page monography Sacha Guitry. Cent ans de théâtre et d'esprit (1985), translated: "The time has come to do justice to this excellent film (very coldly received, of course, by the politicized press of the time), almost always fascinating, that rehabilitates a historical figure too often maligned and brings us back the great Sacha Guitry at the top of his game as an actor and director, if not author."

== Data ==
=== Credits ===
Main credits

- Director: Sacha Guitry
- Script, adaptation, dialogues: Sacha Guitry (after his play Talleyrand, 1948)
- Cinematography : Nicolas Toporkoff
- Music: Louis Beydts
- Production manager: Jean Mugeli

Other credits

- Assistant directors: François Gir, Jeanne Etiévant
- Editing: Jeannette Berton
- Film sets: René Renoux
- Cameraman: Marcel Franchi
- Sound: Jean Rieul
- Production company: Union Cinématographique Lyonnaise (UCIL)
- Distributor: Compagnie Parisienne de Location de Films (CPLF) and Gaumont

=== Cast ===
Main cast, in credits order

- Sacha Guitry as Talleyrand
- Lana Marconi as Madame Grand (Talleyrand's wife)
- Émile Drain as Napoleon (and one lackey)
- Henry Laverne (billed "Henry-Laverne") as Louis XVIII (and one lackey)
- Maurice Teynac as Charles X (and one lackey)
- Philippe Richard (billed "Philippe-Richard") as Louis Philippe I (and one lackey)
- Georges Spanelly as Count of Montrond
- Robert Dartois as Count of Rémusat
- Renée Devillers as Duchess of Dino
- Georges Grey as General Caulaincourt
- Jeanne Fusier-Gir as Marie-Thérèse Champignon (the female conspirator)
- José Noguero as Duke of San Carlos
- Maurice Escande as Prince of Metternich
- Jean Debucourt as Baron of Humboldt
- Pierre Bertin as Baron Nesselrode (later Count)
- Roger Gaillard as Lord Castelreagh
- André Randall (billed "Randall") as Lord Grey
- Howard Vernon as Lord Palmerston
- Jacques Varennes as General Lafayette
- Maurice Schutz as Voltaire
- José Torres (billed "José Torrès") as Don Juan d'Azcona
- Pauline Carton as the female chiromancer
- Denis d'Inès as Don Basilio (in The Barber of Seville)
- Jean Piat as Figaro (in The Barber of Seville)
- André Brunot as Dr. Bartolo (in The Barber of Seville)

Uncredited cast, alphabetically

- Renée Bouzy as (unspecified)
- Georges Bréhat as (unspecified)
- Jean-Claude Briet as a lackey
- Anne Campion as Pauline de Dino (Talleyrand's great-niece)
- Daniel Ceccaldi as (unspecified)
- Jane Daury as a Spanish woman
- Dominique Davray as (unspecified)
- Max Dejean as a cop
- Philippe Derevel as (unspecified)
- Bernard Dhéran as Almaviva (in The Barber of Seville)
- Françoise Engel as Rosine
- Robert Favart as abbot Dupanloup
- Catherine Fonteney as Princess of Chalais
- Yvonne Hébert as the lady's companion
- Robert Hossein as a guest dressed in white
- Pierre Lecocq as Count Roederer
- Michel Lemoine as Prince of Asturias (later Ferdinand VII of Spain)
- Simone Logeart as (unspecified)
- Sophie Mallet as the maid
- Michel Nastorg as a lackey
- Georges Rivière as Marquis de la Tour de Bournac
- Robert Seller as Prince of Polignac
- Léon Walther as Dr. Cruveilhier

=== Release ===
Release

- Original title: Le Diable boiteux
- Genre: historical film
- Country of origin: France
- Language: French
- Released: 29 September 1948 (France), 1948 (World)

Specifications

- Runtime: 125 minutes
- Photography: black-and-white
- Film: 35 mm
- Image ratio: 1.37:1
- Sound mix: mono
