= Toâ =

1949 film

- Directed by: Sacha Guitry
- Written by: Sacha Guitry
- Based on: Toâ by Sacha Guitry
- Produced by: Charles Méré
- Starring: Sacha Guitry; Lana Marconi; Mireille Perrey
- Cinematography: Noël Ramettre
- Edited by: Gabriel Rongier
- Music by: Louiguy
- Production company: Les Films Minerva
- Distributed by: Comptoir Français du Film
- Release date: 28 October 1949
- Running time: 85 minutes
- Country: France
- Language: French

Toâ is a 1949 French comedy film directed by Sacha Guitry and starring Guitry, Lana Marconi and Mireille Perrey. It is an adaptation of Guitry's own play of the same title. Location shooting took place around the Théâtre du Gymnase in Paris. The film's sets were designed by the art director Nersès Bartau.

== Cast ==
- Sacha Guitry as Michel Desnoyer
- Lana Marconi as Anna Ecaterina
- Mireille Perrey as Françoise
- Jeanne Fusier-Gir as Maria La Huchette
- Robert Seller as Fernand
- Jacques d'Herville as Henri Pauguet, the butler
- Michel Nastorg as René
- Solange Varennes as une spectatrice au théâtre

== Bibliography ==
- Bessy, Maurice & Chirat, Raymond. Histoire du cinéma français: encyclopédie des films, 1940–1950. Pygmalion, 1986.
- Goble, Alan. The Complete Index to Literary Sources in Film. Walter de Gruyter, 1999.
- Rège, Philippe. Encyclopedia of French Film Directors, Volume 1. Scarecrow Press, 2009.
