= Pierre Bertin =

French actor

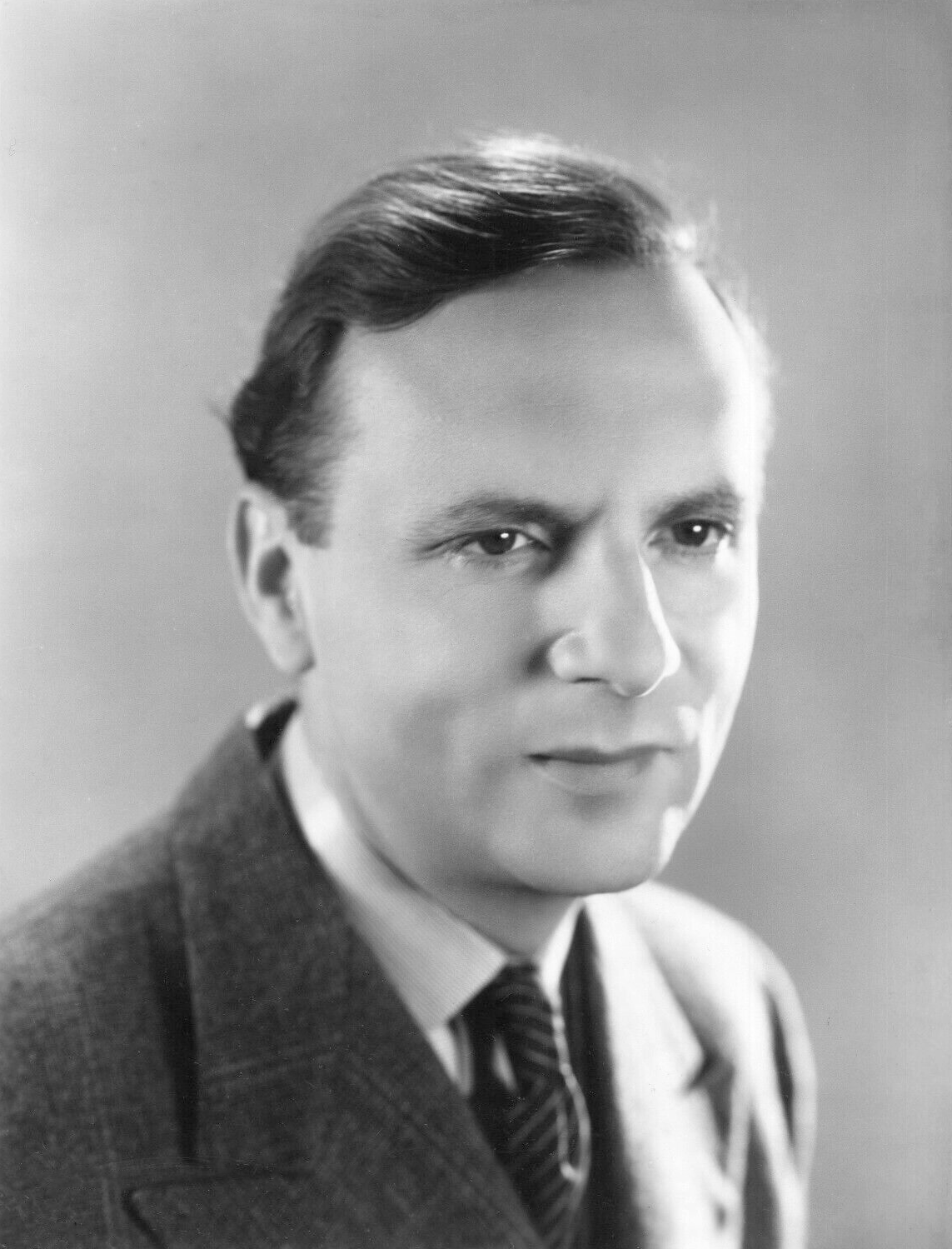
- Pierre Bertin in 1931
- Born: Pierre Victor Théophile Bertin; 24 October 1891; Lille, France
- Died: 13 May 1984 (aged 92); Paris, France
- Occupation: Actor
- Years active: 1916-1975

Pierre Victor Théophile Bertin (24 October 1891 – 13 May 1984) was a French stage and film actor. In 1948, he starred in the film The Lame Devil under Sacha Guitry.

He was the librettist of the opéra-comique La Gageure imprévue after Sedaine with music by Henri Sauguet, first performed at the Paris, Opéra-Comique in 1944, and for the radio opera Les Deux Rendez-vous (after Nerval) by Claude Arrieu first broadcast in 1951.

Pierre Bertin was born in Lille and died in Paris.

== Selected filmography ==
- L'instinct (1916)
- Le secret de la comtesse (1917)
- Love Songs (1930) - Claude Merlerault
- Montmartre (1931) - Frédéric Charençon
- I'll Be Alone After Midnight (1931) - Michel
- The Champion Cook (1932) - Oscar Ormont
- The Chocolate Girl (1932) - Paul Normand
- L'affaire de la rue Mouffetard (1932) - L'avocat
- Le roi bis (1932) - Leducq
- Professeur Cupidon (1933) - Suchet - un professeur timide
- Une nuit de folies (1934) - Anatole
- Coralie and Company (1934) - Maître Loizeau
- Let's Make a Dream (1936) - Un invité (prologue)
- La main passe (1936)
- Girls in Distress (1939) - Legris, le secrétaire de Me Presle
- Sins of Youth (1941) - Gaston Noblet
- Mademoiselle Béatrice (1943) - Archange
- Shop Girls of Paris (1943) - Gaujon
- Le Corbeau (1943) - Le sous-préfet
- L'insaisissable Frédéric (1946) - Granier
- Cyrano de Bergerac (1946) - Le comte de Guiche
- The Queen's Necklace (1946) - L'abbé Loth
- Pas un mot à la reine mère (1946) - Le duc de Palestrinat
- The Beautiful Trip (1947) - Le passager au monocle
- Last Chance Castle (1947) - Le professeur Patureau-Duparc
- The Lame Devil (1948) - Le baron de Nesselrode
- Wicked City (1949) - Le monsieur sérieux
- Orpheus (1950) - Le commissaire
- Cartouche, King of Paris (1950) - Monsieur de Boisgreux
- Véronique (1950) - Croquenard
- Tire au flanc (1950) - Le colonel
- My Friend Oscar (1951) - UNESCO Director-General
- Dr. Knock (1951) - L'instituteur Bernard
- My Seal and Them (1951) - Monsieur de Saint-Brive
- Monsieur Fabre (1951) - L'empereur Napoléon III
- Il padrone sono me (1955) - Il professore
- On ne badine pas avec l'amour (1955) - Le baron
- Elena and Her Men (1956) - Martin-Michaud
- Babette Goes to War (1959) - Le Duc de Crécy
- La marraine de Charley (1959) - M. de Saint-Sevran
- Les Bonnes Femmes (1960) - Monsieur Belin
- Dialogue of the Carmelites (1960) - Le marquis de la Force
- Les Tontons flingueurs (1963) - Adolphe Amédée Delafoy
- Comment épouser un premier ministre (1964) - Le présentateur de la soirée de gala
- Pas de caviar pour tante Olga (1965) - M. Dumont-Freville
- How to Keep the Red Lamp Burning (1965) - Le président du tribunal (segment "Procès, Le")
- Nights of Farewell (1965) - Petipa's Father
- La Grande Vadrouille (1966) - Le grand-père de Juliette - propriétaire du guignol
- The Stranger (1967) - Judge
- La Vie parisienne (as the Baron de Gondremarck, 1967), directed by Yves-André Hubert (television version of 1958 stage production by Jean-Louis Barrault).
- A Time for Loving (1972) - Invité de mme. olga
- Repeated Absences (1972) - Georges, le vieil homosexuel
- L'oiseau rare (1973) - Jérôme Dieudonné, le poète
- Calmos (1976) - Le chanoine
- Le beaujolais nouveau est arrivé (1978) - Le vieux Casseur
