= Cyrano de Bergerac (1946 film) =

1946 film by Fernand Rivers

- Directed by: Fernand Rivers
- Written by: Fernand Rivers
- Based on: Cyrano de Bergerac; 1897 play by Edmond Rostand
- Starring: Claude Dauphin; Ellen Bernsen; Pierre Bertin
- Cinematography: Jean Bachelet
- Edited by: Marguerite Beaugé
- Music by: Henri Verdun
- Production company: Les Films Fernand Rivers
- Distributed by: Les Films Fernand Rivers
- Release date: 29 August 1946
- Running time: 100 minutes
- Country: France
- Language: French

Cyrano de Bergerac is a 1946 French romantic comedy film directed by Fernand Rivers and starring Claude Dauphin, Ellen Bernsen and Pierre Bertin. It is based on the 1897 play Cyrano de Bergerac by Edmond Rostand.

The film's sets were designed by the art director René Renoux.

== Cast ==
- Claude Dauphin as Cyrano de Bergerac
- Ellen Bernsen as Roxane
- Pierre Bertin as Le comte de Guiche
- Christian Bertola as Christian de Neuvillette,
- Michel Nastorg as Le Bret
- Gaston Rullier as Carbon de Castel-Jaloux
- René Sarvil as Ragueneau
- Alice Tissot as la duègne
- Desportes as Montfleury
- Max Roger as le vicomte de Valvert
- Henri Vernet
- Paul Faivre
- Jeanne Hardeyn
- Christiane Sertilange
- Jean-Marc Tennberg
- Christian Alers
- Robert Balpo
- Madeleine Brosy

== Bibliography ==
- Oscherwitz, Dayna & Higgins, MaryEllen. The A to Z of French Cinema. Scarecrow Press, 2009.
- Oscherwitz, Dayna. Past Forward: French Cinema and the Post-Colonial Heritage. SIU Press, 2010.
