= Tillers of the Soil =

1923 film

- Directed by: Robert Boudrioz
- Written by: Alexandre Arnoux
- Produced by: Abel Gance
- Starring: Charles Vanel; Jacques de Féraudy; Renée Tandil
- Cinematography: Maurice Arnou; Gaston Brun
- Production company: Films Abel Gance
- Release date: 5 January 1923
- Country: France
- Languages: Silent; French intertitles

Tillers of the Soil (French:L'âtre) is a 1923 French silent drama film directed by Robert Boudrioz and starring Charles Vanel, Jacques de Féraudy and Renée Tandil.

== Cast ==
- Charles Vanel as Bernard Larade
- Jacques de Féraudy as Jean Larade
- Renée Tandil as Arlette
- Maurice Schutz as Grand-père
- René Donnio as Le domestique

== Bibliography ==
- Powrie, Phil & Rebillard, Éric. Pierre Batcheff and stardom in 1920s French cinema. Edinburgh University Press, 2009
