= The Virtuous Scoundrel =

1953 film

- Directed by: Sacha Guitry
- Written by: Sacha Guitry
- Produced by: Simon Barstoff
- Starring: Michel Simon; Marguerite Pierry; Laurence Badie
- Cinematography: Jean Bachelet
- Edited by: Raymond Lamy
- Music by: Louiguy
- Production companies: Simon Barstoff Films; Général Productions
- Distributed by: Les Films Corona
- Release date: 18 February 1953
- Running time: 85 minutes
- Country: France
- Language: French

The Virtuous Scoundrel (French: La Vie d'un honnête homme), is a 1953 French comedy drama film directed and written by Sacha Guitry and starring Michel Simon, Marguerite Pierry and Laurence Badie. It was shot at Photosonor Studios in Paris and on location in the city. The film's sets were designed by the art director Aimé Bazin.

== Synopsis ==
twin brothers have lived apart for many years. Albert has become a financial success and lives a very rigid life with his family while Alain is a free spirit enjoying a series of adventures travelling the world. After meeting, Alain dies from a heart attack, and on a spur of the moment Albert changes clothes with him and begins to enjoy his newfound freedom. However his wife, believing herself now to be a widow, attempts to marry who she thinks is Alain as he has inherited all of his brother's wealth.

== Cast ==
- Michel Simon as Albert and Alain Ménard-Lacoste
- Marguerite Pierry as Madeleine Lacoste, wife of Albert
- Laurence Badie as Juliette Lacoste, the daughter of Albert and Madeleine
- François Guérin as Pierre Lacoste, the son of Albert and Madeleine
- Louis de Funès as Emile, the valet of the Ménard-Lacoste
- Claude Gensac as Evelyne
- Léon Walther as Maître Denisot
- Michel Nastorg as Le mécanicien
- Marthe Salbel as Marie, cousin of Ménard-Lacoste
- Pauline Carton as the patroness of the hotel
- Lana Marconi as a prostitute, nicknamed "la comtesse"
- Georges Bever as the taxi driver
- André Brunot as the doctor Ogier
- Marcel Pérès as the commissary Vincent
- Max Dejean as the innkeeper
- Marcel Mouloudji as Le chanteur
- Sacha Guitry as Self

== Bibliography ==
- Crisp, Colin. French Cinema—A Critical Filmography: Volume 2, 1940–1958. Indiana University Press, 2015.
