= I'll Be Alone After Midnight =

1931 film

- Directed by: Jacques de Baroncelli
- Written by: Henri-Georges Clouzot; Pierre-Gilles Veber
- Based on: I'll Be Alone After Midnight by Albert Jean
- Produced by: Adolphe Osso; Georges Bernier
- Starring: Mireille Perrey; Pierre Bertin; Vanah Yami
- Cinematography: Louis Chaix; Henri Janvier
- Music by: Philippe Parès; Georges Van Parys
- Production company: Les Films Osso
- Distributed by: Les Films Osso
- Release date: 1931
- Running time: 102 minutes
- Country: France
- Language: French

I'll Be Alone After Midnight (French: Je serai seule après minuit) is a 1931 French comedy film directed by Jacques de Baroncelli and starring Mireille Perrey, Pierre Bertin and Vanah Yami. The film's sets were designed by the art director Robert Gys.

== Cast ==
- Mireille Perrey as Monique Argilliers
- Pierre Bertin as Michel
- Vanah Yami as La bonne
- Roger Blum as Le mari
- Maurice Rémy as Le cambrioleur
- Georges Bever as Le petit employé
- Marcel Barencey as Le marinier
- Louis Kerly as Le monsieur pressé
- Paul Velsa as Le militaire
- Robert Goupil as Le pêcheur à la ligne
- Émile Saint-Ober as Le pépiniériste
- Joë Hamman as Le jazzman
- Chaumel as Le marchand de ballons
- Fred Marche as Le raccommodeur de porcelaine

== Bibliography ==
- Bessy, Maurice & Chirat, Raymond. Histoire du cinéma français: 1929-1934. Pygmalion, 1988.
- Crisp, Colin. Genre, Myth and Convention in the French Cinema, 1929-1939. Indiana University Press, 2002.
- Rège, Philippe. Encyclopedia of French Film Directors, Volume 1. Scarecrow Press, 2009.
