= The Champion Cook =

1932 film directed by Karl Anton

- French film poster
- French: Le cordon bleu
- Directed by: Karl Anton
- Written by: Tristan Bernard (play)
- Starring: Pierre Bertin; Jeanne Helbling; Louis Baron fils
- Cinematography: Willy Faktorovitch
- Music by: Francis Gromon
- Production company: Les Studios Paramount
- Distributed by: Les Films Paramount
- Release date: 9 January 1932
- Running time: 85 minutes
- Country: France
- Language: French

The Champion Cook (French: Le cordon bleu) is a 1932 French comedy film directed by Karl Anton and starring Pierre Bertin, Jeanne Helbling and Louis Baron fils. It was made by the French subsidiary of Paramount Pictures at Joinville Studios near Paris.

== Cast ==
- Pierre Bertin as Oscar Ormont
- Jeanne Helbling as Irma
- Louis Baron fils as Bernereau
- Lucien Baroux as Lucien Dumorel
- Marguerite Moreno as Mme. Dumorel
- Marcel Vallée as Detective Dick
- Madeleine Guitty as Célestine
- Maurice Lagrenée as Arthur
- Edwige Feuillère as Régine
- Pedro Elviro as Achille
- Jeanne Fusier-Gir
- Simone Héliard
