= Sins of Youth (film) =

1941 film directed by Maurice Tourneur

- Directed by: Maurice Tourneur
- Written by: Michel Duran; Charles Spaak; Albert Valentin
- Produced by: Alfred Greven
- Starring: Harry Baur; Lise Delamare; Monique Joyce
- Cinematography: Armand Thirard
- Music by: Henri Sauguet
- Production company: Continental Films
- Distributed by: L'Alliance Cinématographique Européenne
- Release date: 16 November 1941
- Running time: 95 minutes
- Country: France
- Language: French

Sins of Youth (French: Péchés de jeunesse) is a 1941 French comedy drama film directed by Maurice Tourneur and starring Harry Baur, Lise Delamare and Monique Joyce. It was produced by the German-backed Continental Films. It was shot at the Neuilly Studios in Paris. The film's sets were designed by the art director Guy de Gastyne.

== Synopsis ==
Monsieur Lacalade an aging millionaire thinks of the three sons and their three separate mothers he abandoned decades before. He sets out on a quest to find them and reconnect.

== Cast ==
- Harry Baur as Monsieur Lacalade
- Lise Delamare as Madeleine
- Monique Joyce as Miss Florence
- Suzanne Dantès as Louise Noblet
- Marguerite Ducouret as Emma Vacheron
- Jeanne Fusier-Gir as Henriette Noblet
- Yvette Chauviré as Gabrielle
- Guillaume de Sax as Le docteur Pelletan
- Pierre Bertin as Gaston Noblet
- Fred Pasquali as Edmond Vacheron
- Jean Bobillot as Lucien Noblet
- Jean-Marie Boyer as Philippe
- Jean Buquet as Frédéric
- Georges Chamarat as Fernand Noblet
- Andrée Champeaux as Simone, la serveuse
- Bernard Daydé as André
- Henri de Livry as Le placeur à l'opéra
- Carmen Deraisy as La chiromancienne
- Lucien Desagneaux as Un admirateur
- Gabrielle Fontan as L'habilleuse
- Mona France as Une admiratrice
- Michel François as Maurice
- Janie Grazia as Un serveuse
- Hennery as Un spectateur
- Palmyre Levasseur as La cuisinière
- Marcel Maupi as Le commissaire
- Marcel Melrac as Le chauffeur
- Clary Monthal as Marthe Noblet
- Marcelle Monthil as Mademoiselle Archimbaud
- Noëlle Norman as L'infirmière
- Julienne Paroli as La couturière
- Marcel Pérès as Le bonimenteur
- Marcelle Rexiane as Jeanne Noblet
- Robert Rollis as Le groom
- Nina Sinclair as Adèle, la servante
- Eugène Stuber as Un forain
- Jacques Varennes as Firmin, le maître d'hôtel
- Jules Vibert as Delormel, le critique
- Yvonne Yma as La grosse spectatrice

== Bibliography ==
- Bessy, Maurice & Chirat, Raymond. Histoire du cinéma français: encyclopédie des films, 1940–1950. Pygmalion, 1986
- Leteux, Christine. Continental Films: French Cinema under German Control. University of Wisconsin Press, 2022.
- Rège, Philippe. Encyclopedia of French Film Directors, Volume 1. Scarecrow Press, 2009.
- Waldman, Harry. Maurice Tourneur: The Life and Films. McFarland, 2001.
