= Pamela (film) =

1945 film

- Directed by: Pierre de Hérain
- Written by: Pierre Lestringuez
- Based on: Pamela by Victorien Sardou
- Produced by: Camille Trachimel
- Starring: Fernand Gravey; Renée Saint-Cyr; Georges Marchal
- Cinematography: René Gaveau
- Edited by: Henriette Wurtzer
- Music by: Maurice Thiriet
- Production companies: Films Camille Trachimel; Société Parisienne de Cinéma
- Distributed by: Les Films Minerva
- Release date: 2 May 1945
- Running time: 109 minutes
- Country: France
- Language: French

Pamela (French: Paméla) is a 1945 French historical drama film directed by Pierre de Hérain and starring Fernand Gravey, Renée Saint-Cyr and Georges Marchal.

It is based on an 1898 play of the same title by Victorien Sardou which portrays an attempt to rescue the young Louis XVII from prison during the French Revolution. The film's sets were designed by the art director Roland Quignon. It recorded admissions in France of 1,649,882.

== Synopsis ==
In Paris during the revolutionary Directory period a scheme is hatched to rescue the young son and heir of the executed French king. Pamela, owner of a fashion house, is one of they participants while the powerful Paul Barras turns a blind eye to the conspiracy for reasons of his own.

== Cast ==
- Fernand Gravey as Paul Barras
- Renée Saint-Cyr as Paméla
- Georges Marchal as René Bergerin
- Yvette Lebon as Madame Tallien
- Jeanne Fusier-Gir as La Montansier
- Raymond Bussières as Gomin
- Jacques Varennes as Rochecotte
- Gisèle Casadesus as Joséphine de Beauharnais
- Jacques Castelot as Le prince de Carency
- René Génin as Gourlet
- Serge Emrich as Louis XVII
- Nicole Maurey as Madame Royale
- Jean Boissemond
- André Carnège
- Jean Chaduc as Napoléon Bonaparte
- Henri Charrett as Baudu
- Marius David
- Paul Demange as Un membre du comité
- Huguette Ferly
- Richard Francoeur as Le commissaire
- Jacques Grétillat as Le Villeheurnois
- Marie-Reine Kergal
- Maurice Lagrenée as Lapierre
- Georges Marny as Bottot
- Roland Milès
- Jean Ozenne as Bourguignon
- Jean Rigaux as Barnerin
- Max Roche
- Hélène Tossy
- Vandéric
- Jeanne Véniat

== Bibliography ==
- Goble, Alan. The Complete Index to Literary Sources in Film. Walter de Gruyter, 1999.
