= Two Doves =

1949 film

- Directed by: Sacha Guitry
- Written by: Sacha Guitry
- Based on: Two Doves by Sacha Guitry
- Produced by: André Roy; Charles Roy
- Starring: Pauline Carton; Lana Marconi; Marguerite Pierry
- Cinematography: Noël Ramettre
- Edited by: Gabriel Rongier
- Music by: Louiguy
- Production company: Roy Films
- Distributed by: Les Films Fernand Rivers
- Release date: 27 July 1949
- Running time: 95 minutes
- Country: France
- Language: French

Two Doves (French: Aux deux colombes) is a 1949 French comedy film directed by Sacha Guitry and starring Guitry, Pauline Carton, Lana Marconi, and Marguerite Pierry. It was based on a play of the same title by Guitry. It was shot at the Francoeur Studios in Paris. The film's sets were designed by art director Louis Le Barbenchon.

== Synopsis ==
The respectable Jean-Pierre Walter is warned by telephone one day that he has a big surprise coming. It turns out to be his first wife Marie-Jeanne, long thought dead in South America, who happens to be the sister of his second wife Marie-Thérèse.

== Cast ==
- Sacha Guitry as Maitre Jean-Pierre Walter
- Lana Marconi as La grande duchesse Christine
- Marguerite Pierry as Marie-Jeanne - la première épouse
- Pauline Carton as Angèle - la servante
- Suzanne Dantès as Marie-Thérèse - la deuxième épouse
- Robert Seller as Charles - le valet de chambre

== Bibliography ==
- Bernard, André & Paucard, Alain. Sacha Guitry. L'AGE D'HOMME, 2002.
- Goble, Alan. The Complete Index to Literary Sources in Film. Walter de Gruyter, 1999.
- Rège, Philippe. Encyclopedia of French Film Directors, Volume 1. Scarecrow Press, 2009.
