= My Last Mistress =

1943 film

- Directed by: Sacha Guitry
- Written by: Sacha Guitry
- Produced by: Michel Manégat
- Starring: Sacha Guitry; Aimé Clariond; Mona Goya
- Cinematography: Fédote Bourgasoff
- Edited by: Alice Dumas
- Music by: Paul Durand; Henri Verdun
- Production companies: Compagnie Cinématographique Méditerranéenne de Production; Les Moulins d'Or
- Distributed by: Union Française de Production Cinématographique
- Release date: 24 November 1943
- Running time: 101 minutes
- Country: France
- Language: French

My Last Mistress (French: Donne-moi tes yeux) is a 1943 French drama film directed by and starring Sacha Guitry and also featuring Geneviève Guitry, Aimé Clariond and Mona Goya. It was produced during the German occupation of France. The film's sets were designed by the art directors Henri Ménessier and Roland Quignon.

== Synopsis ==
François, a celebrated sculptor, meets and falls in love with the much younger Catherine when she comes to pose as his model. They develop plans for their life together, but he suddenly becomes distant and pushes her away and spends time in the company of a louche, cabaret artist Gilda. Catherine realises that he is losing his sight, and does not want her to be chained to him for the rest of her life. However, she returns to be by his side and be his eyes in the future.

== Cast ==
- Sacha Guitry as François
- Geneviève Guitry as Catherine
- Aimé Clariond as Jean Laurent
- Marguerite Moreno as La grand-mère
- Mona Goya as Gilda
- Mila Parély as Floriane
- Marguerite Pierry as Mademoiselle Thomessin
- Jeanne Fusier-Gir as Clotilde
- Fred Pasquali as Le peintre
- Solange Varenne as Le modèle
- Claude Martial as La présentatrice
- Léon Walther as Le docteur
- Maurice Teynac as L'imitateur
- Hélène Dartigue as Une infirmière
- Georges Lemaire as Le garde
- Jean-Louis Allibert as Un visiteur
- René Fauchois as L'ami à l'exposition
- Georges Marny as L'ami du peintre
- Henri Chauvet as Le passant
- Richard Francoeur as Le visiteur
- Raymond Narlay as Le maître d'hôtel
- Maurice Carrère as Self / En personne
- Mariemma Bardi as La danseuse espagnole
- Frédéric Duvallès as Le monsieur en noir

== Bibliography ==
- Rège, Philippe. Encyclopedia of French Film Directors, Volume 1. Scarecrow Press, 2009.
- Siclier, Jacques. La France de Pétain et son cinéma. H. Veyrier, 1981.
- Witt, Michael. Jean-Luc Godard, Cinema Historian. Indiana University Press, 2013.
