= The Guardian Angel (1942 film) =

1942 film

- Directed by: Jacques de Casembroot
- Written by: Charles Vildrac
- Produced by: Jean Mugeli
- Starring: Lucien Baroux; Roger Duchesne; Jacques Varennes
- Cinematography: Georges Million
- Music by: Henri Goublier
- Production company: Les Films Minerva
- Distributed by: Les Films Minerva
- Release date: 3 July 1942
- Running time: 94 minutes
- Country: France
- Language: French

The Guardian Angel (French: L'ange gardien) is a 1942 French comedy film directed by Jacques de Casembroot and starring Lucien Baroux, Roger Duchesne and Jacques Varennes. It was shot at the Saint-Laurent-du-Var Studios in Nice. The film's sets were designed by the art director Roger Briaucourt. It was produced by the French branch of Minerva Film.

== Synopsis ==
A retired colonial official lives a quiet life but things are dramatically changed when he has to look after his granddaughter for a while.

== Cast ==
- Lucien Baroux as Duboin
- Carlettina as Colette
- Roger Duchesne as Henri Duboin
- Jacques Varennes as Tirandier
- Catherine Fonteney as La cousine Noémie
- Ellen Dosia as Jane Duboin-Fontange
- Irène Corday as Marie
- Alfred Baillou as Un invité
- Paul Demange as Le notaire
- Maxime Fabert as Le jardinier
- Jean Fay as L'impresario
- Jeanne Fusier-Gir as Mademoiselle Boulommier
- Pierre Labry as Jaminet
- Georges Sellier as Carpent
- Léon Walther as Molignon
- Jean Morel
- Vicky Verley
- Max David
- Eugène Yvernès

== Bibliography ==
- Rège, Philippe . Encyclopedia of French Film Directors, Volume 1. Scarecrow Press, 2009.
