= Murders (film) =

1950 film

- Directed by: Richard Pottier
- Written by: Charles Plisnier; Maurice Barry; Henri Jeanson
- Based on: Murders by Charles Plisnier
- Produced by: Jacques Bar; Walter Rupp
- Starring: Fernandel; Mireille Perrey; Jacques Varennes
- Cinematography: André Germain
- Edited by: Hélène Battini
- Music by: Raymond Legrand
- Production companies: Cité Films; Fidès
- Distributed by: Victory Films
- Release date: 10 October 1950
- Running time: 120 minutes
- Country: France
- Language: French

Murders (French: Meurtres) is a 1950 French drama film directed by Richard Pottier and starring Fernandel, Mireille Perrey and Jacques Varennes. The film is adapted from a series of five novels by Belgian writer Charles Plisnier, published between 1939 and 1941. It marked a rare dramatic role for the comedian Fernandel. It was shot at the Neuilly Studios in Paris. The film's sets were designed by the art director Paul-Louis Boutié. The title is also written as Murders? (French: Meurtres?).

== Cast ==
- Fernandel as Noël Annequin
- Mireille Perrey as Blanche Annequin
- Jacques Varennes as Hervé Annequin
- Colette Mareuil as Lola Annequin
- Jeanne Moreau as Martine Annequin
- Philippe Nicaud as José Annequin
- Georges Chamarat as Le Juge Pierregot
- Line Noro as Isabelle Annequin
- Germaine Kerjean as Madame Frangier
- André Carnège as Le procureur
- Yvonne Hébert as Madame De Marcielle
- Fernand Sardou as Le garagiste
- Marthe Marty as La Femme du garagiste
- Edmond Beauchamp as Le professeur Le Gossec
- Henri Arius as Un ami
- Jacques Berlioz as Le directeur de l'asile
- Raymond Souplex as Blaise Annequin
- Jacques Beauvais as Un maître d'hôtel
- Frédéric Mariotti as Un infirmier
- Laure Paillette as La domestique de Blaise et Blanche
- Jacqueline Pierreux as Irène

== Bibliography ==
- Bessy, Maurice & Chirat, Raymond. Histoire du cinéma français: encyclopédie des films, 1940–1950. Pygmalion, 1986
- Crisp, Colin. French Cinema–A Critical Filmography: Volume 2, 1940–1958. Indiana University Press, 2015.
- Oscherwitz, Dayna & Higgins, MaryEllen . The A to Z of French Cinema. Scarecrow Press, 2009.
- Rège, Philippe. Encyclopedia of French Film Directors, Volume 1. Scarecrow Press, 2009.
