= Lana Marconi =

Romanian-French actress

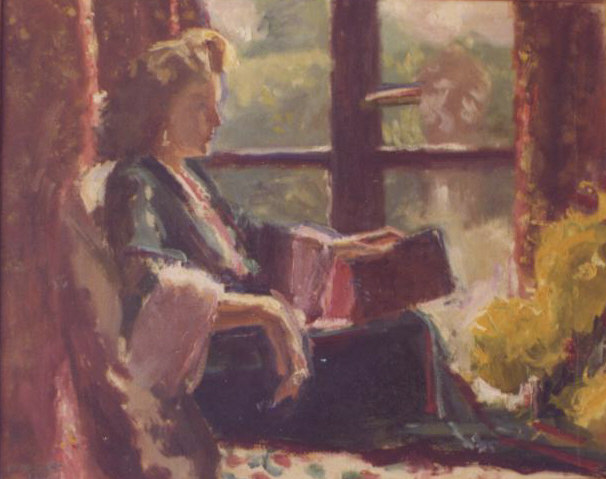
Lana Marconi by Léon Gard

Lana Marconi (born Ecaterina Ileana Marcovici; 8 September 1917 in Bucharest, Romania – 8 December 1990) was a Romanian-French actress, and the fifth and last wife of the famous French actor-director-playwright Sacha Guitry (1885–1957), whom she married in 1949. She appeared exclusively in her husband's films.

== Filmography ==
Year	Title	Role	Notes
1948	Le comédien	Catherine Maillard	
1948	Le Diable Boiteux	Mme Grand	
1949	Two Doves	La grande duchesse Christine	
1949	Toâ	Anna Ecaterina	
1950	The Treasure of Cantenac	Virginie Lacassagne	
1950	Tu m'as sauvé la vie	La marquise de Pralognan	
1951	Deburau	Marie Duplessis	
1952	Je l'ai été trois fois	Thérèse Verdier	
1953	La Vie d'un honnête homme	La 'comtesse'	
1954	Si Versailles m'était conté	La reine Marie-Antoinette / Nicole Legay	
1955	Napoléon	Marie Walewska	
1956	Si Paris nous était conté	La reine Marie-Antoinette	(final film role)
