= Deburau (film) =

1951 film

- Directed by: Sacha Guitry
- Written by: Sacha Guitry
- Based on: Deburau by Sacha Guitry
- Produced by: Jean Berard; Raymond Borderie
- Starring: Sacha Guitry; Lana Marconi; Robert Seller
- Cinematography: Noël Ramettre
- Edited by: Raymond Lamy
- Music by: Louis Beydts
- Production company: Compagnie Industrielle et Commerciale Cinématographique
- Distributed by: Filmsonor
- Release date: 29 June 1951
- Running time: 93 minutes
- Country: France
- Language: French

Deburau is a 1951 French historical comedy drama film directed by and starring Sacha Guitry alongside Lana Marconi, Robert Seller and Jeanne Fusier-Gir. It is based on Guitry's own 1918 play Deburau, inspired by the life of the eighteenth century mime Jean-Gaspard Deburau. It was shot at the Francoeur Studios in Paris. The film's sets were designed by the art director René Renoux.

== Cast ==
- Sacha Guitry as Jean-Gaspard Deburau / Self
- Lana Marconi as Marie Duplessis
- Michel François as Charles Deburau fils
- Robert Seller as M. Bertrand
- Jeanne Fusier-Gir as Mme. Raboin
- Georges Bever as Laurent
- Jean Danet as Armand Duval
- Claire Brilletti as Clara
- Henri Belly as Un journaliste
- Christine Darbel as Honorine
- Jacques de Féraudy as Le docteur
- Jacques Derives as Laplace
- Albert Duvaleix as Robillard
- Luce Fabiole as Mme. Rébard
- Françoise Fechter as Justine
- Andrée Guize as Une dame
- Yvonne Hébert as La caissière
- Henry Laverne as L'aboyeur
- Max Morana as Ménard

== Bibliography ==
- Hayward, Susan. French Costume Drama of the 1950s: Fashioning Politics in Film. Intellect Books, 2010.
