= Mireille Perrey =

French actress (1904–1991)

- Born: 3 February 1904; Bordeaux, Gironde, France
- Died: 8 May 1991 (aged 87); Fontainebleau, Seine-et-Marne, France
- Other name: Camille Mireille Perret
- Occupation: Actress
- Years active: 1931 - 1980 (film)

Mireille Perrey (1904–1991) was a French stage and film actress. Perrey played some leading roles in the 1930s but gradually developed into a character actor, appearing in films such as the British comedy Hotel Sahara (1951). In 1964 she was featured in The Umbrellas of Cherbourg.

Between 1942 and 1947 she was a member of the Comédie-Française.

== Filmography ==
Year	Title	Role	Notes
1931	Pas sur la bouche	Gilberte Valandray	
1931	I'll Be Alone After Midnight	Monique Argilliers	
1933	The Porter from Maxim's	Totoche	
1934	L'école des contribuables	Juliette Valtier	
1934	Dédé	Odette Chausson	
1935	Juanita	Juanita - une jolie Tzigane	
1935	Jim la houlette	Pauline Bretonneau	
1936	The Lover of Madame Vidal	Françoise Charny	
1936	The Blue Mouse	Madame Rigaud	
1936	Les petites alliées	Mandarine	
1937	Mon deputé et sa femme	La baronne de la Carbonnière	
1937	La fessée	Hermine Chauchois	
1938	Education of a Prince	Gisèle Beryl	
1939	Une java	Marie Cerval	
1942	Nadia la femme traquée	Nadia	
1943	Jeannou	Conchita de Cantagril	
1946	Patrie	Catherine Jonas	
1946	Rooster Heart	Mme Bourride, dite :Vera	
1949	Doctor Laennec	Jacquemine d'Argout-Laennec	
1949	Toâ	Françoise	
1950	Miquette	Madame veuve Hermine Grandier	
1950	The Prize	Countess de Blonville	
1950	Murders	Blanche Annequin	
1951	Les maîtres-nageurs	Hélène Marchand	
1951	Dr. Knock	Mme Rémy	
1951	Hotel Sahara	Mme. Pallas	
1952	Love, Madame	Madame Célerier	
1953	Carnival	Isabelle	
1953	The Earrings of Madame de...	La Nourrice	
1954	Adam Is Eve	Mme Corinne	
1955	La villa Sans-Souci	Mme. Legardon	
1955	Tant qu'il y aura des femmes	Juliette Mithouard	
1957	The Man in the Raincoat	Marguerite Constantin	Uncredited
1957	Donnez-moi ma chance	Mme Noblet	
1958	Women's Prison	Mme Vertin - la mère de René	
1959	The Green Mare	La mère Haudouin	
1960	Certains l'aiment froide	Maman	
1960	The Hands of Orlac	Madame Aliberti	
1961	Le Tracassin	La patronne du babilys	
1964	The Umbrellas of Cherbourg	Tante Élise	
1971	Un peu de soleil dans l'eau froide		

== Bibliography ==
- Goble, Alan. The Complete Index to Literary Sources in Film. Walter de Gruyter, 1999.
