= Cage of Girls =

1949 film

- Directed by: Maurice Cloche
- Written by: Maurice Cloche; Henri Danjou; Yves Mirande
- Produced by: Maurice Cloche
- Starring: Danièle Delorme; Jacky Flynt; Louise Lagrange
- Cinematography: Marcel Grignon
- Music by: Marceau Van Hoorebecke
- Production company: Les Films Maurice Cloche
- Release date: 10 October 1949
- Running time: 120 minutes
- Country: France
- Language: French

Cage of Girls (French: La cage aux filles) is a 1949 French drama film directed by Maurice Cloche and starring Danièle Delorme, Jacky Flynt and Louise Lagrange. It is set in a women's prison. The film's sets were designed by the art director René Renoux.

== Cast ==
- Danièle Delorme as Micheline
- Jacky Flynt as Rita
- Louise Lagrange as Alice Baudoin
- Denise Bosc as La Mère Supérieure
- Lise Topart as Sarah
- Michel Marsay as Freddy
- André Pasdoc as L'Aumônier
- Geymond Vital as Pierre Mansois, oncle de Micheline
- Jacques Verrières as Loulou
- Jean-Marc Thibault as Edmond
- Van Mullen
- Carbonnat
- Robichez
- Marc Anthony
- Eliane Charles as Tototte
- Jacqueline Dor as Suzanne
- Nicole Francis
- Muni
- Palmyre Levasseur as La surveillante en chef
- Yvonne Hébert as La Femme de Freddy
- Gaby Tyra
- Françoise Beauté
- Annie Noël
- Sylvie Pelayo
- Annick Martin
- France Marion
- Suzanne Flon as Mme. Edith
- Noël Roquevert as Antoine Baudoin, le beau-père de Micheline
- Marina de Berg as Colette
- Hélène Rémy
- Nina Lazareff
- Françoise Barles
- Ginette Frank
- Liliane Charpentier
- Madeleine Barbulée as Une surveillante
- Joëlle Janin
- Dominique Davray as Une élève du cours
- Susi Jera
- Christine Langart
- Jane Daury
- Yvonne Dany
- Max Rogerys

== Bibliography ==
- Crisp, C.G. The classic French cinema, 1930-1960. Indiana University Press, 1993
