= Jacques de Féraudy =

French actor (1886–1971)

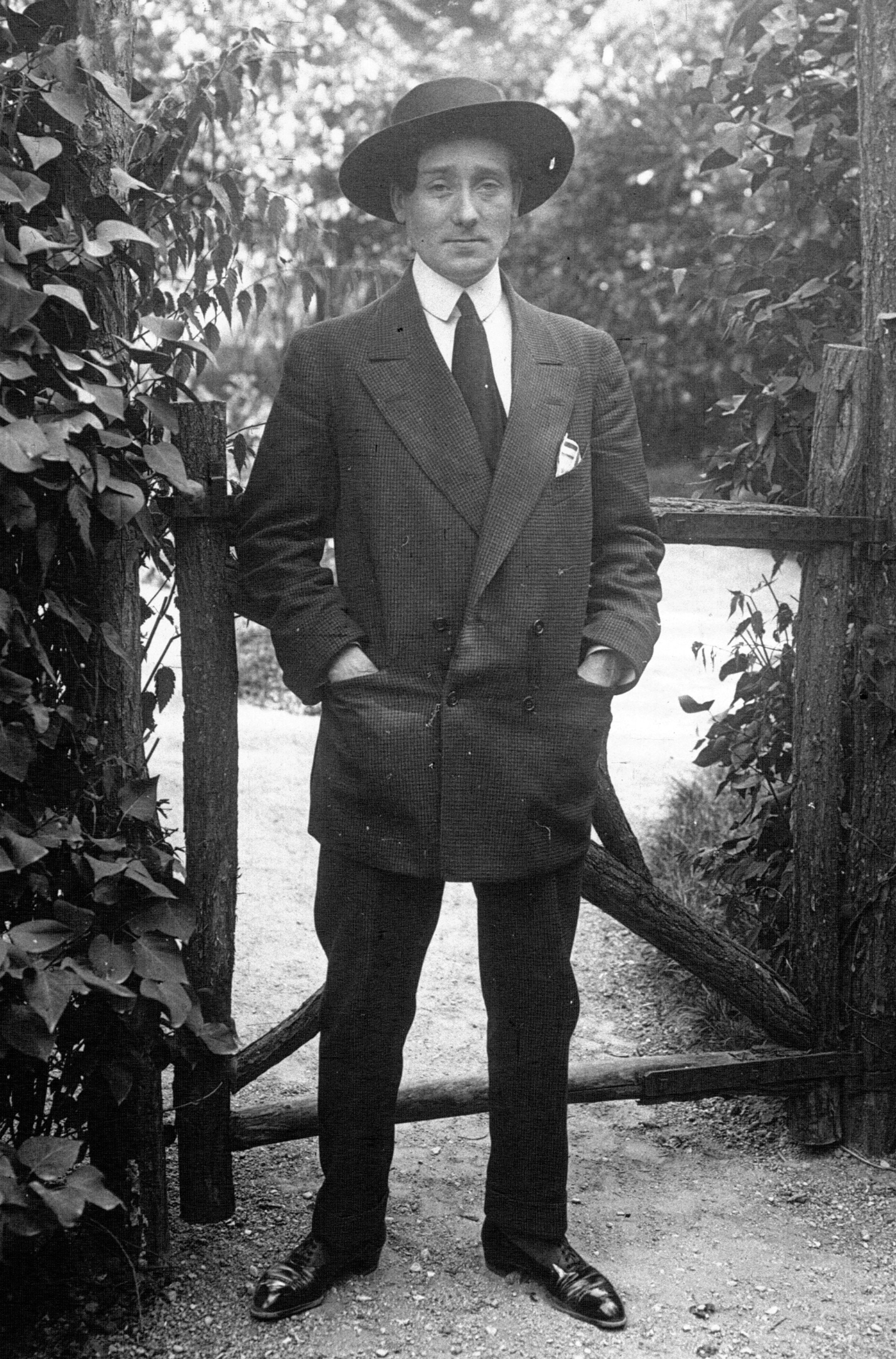
- Jacques de Féraudy in 1911.
- Born: 1 September 1886; Paris, France
- Died: 5 February 1971 (aged 84); Draveil, France
- Other name: Marie Pierre Jacques de Féraudy
- Occupation: Actor
- Years active: 1908–1956 (film)

Jacques de Féraudy (1 September 1886 – 5 February 1971) was a French stage and film actor. He also worked as a screenwriter and directed three films during the silent era.

De Féraudy was the son of the actor Maurice de Féraudy.

== Selected filmography ==
- Tillers of the Soil (1923)
- In Old Alsace (1933)
- Fedora (1934)
- The Pont-Biquet Family (1935)
- Martha (1936)
- Deputy Eusèbe (1939)
- The Treasure of Cantenac (1950)
- Adhémar (1951)
- Darling Caroline (1951)
- Deburau (1951)
- Marianne of My Youth (1955)
- If Paris Were Told to Us (1956)

== Bibliography ==
- Klossner, Michael. The Europe of 1500-1815 on Film and Television. McFarland, 2002.
