= Raymond Lamy =

French film editor and director

- Born: 15 August 1903; Pointe-à-Pitre, Guadeloupe, France
- Died: 7 June 1982 (aged 80); Villeneuve-Loubet, Alpes-Maritimes, France
- Occupations: Editor, Director
- Years active: 1931-1979 (film)

Raymond Lamy (1903–1982) was a French film editor active from the 1930s to the 1970s. He also directed two feature films Clodoche (1938) and Miroir (1947). He edited a number of films for the director Robert Bresson.

== Selected filmography ==
- Fanny (1932)
- The Red Robe (1933)
- Adémaï in the Middle Ages (1935)
- The Slipper Episode (1935)
- Maria of the Night (1936)
- Clodoche (1938)
- Madame Sans-Gêne (1941)
- Chiffon's Wedding (1942)
- The Man Who Played with Fire (1942)
- Sideral Cruises (1942)
- The Stairs Without End (1943)
- Marie-Martine (1943)
- Mademoiselle Béatrice (1943)
- Florence Is Crazy (1944)
- The Eleventh Hour Guest (1945)
- Land Without Stars (1946)
- Mirror (1947)
- La Poison (1951)
- Deburau (1951)
- Adhémar (1951)
- Farewell Paris (1952)
- Alarm in Morocco (1953)
- A Caprice of Darling Caroline (1953)
- The Virtuous Scoundrel (1953)
- Royal Affairs in Versailles (1954)
- Les hommes ne pensent qu'à ça (1954)
- The French, They Are a Funny Race (1955)
- Napoléon (1955)
- A Man Escaped (1956)
- Escapade (1957)
- A Bomb for a Dictator (1957)
- Pickpocket (1959)
- Le Crime ne paie pas (1962)
- Au hasard Balthazar (1966)
- Mouchette (1967)
- A Gentle Woman (1969)
- Four Nights of a Dreamer (1971)

== Bibliography ==
- Rège, Philippe. Encyclopedia of French Film Directors, Volume 1. Scarecrow Press, 2009.
