= Laurence Badie =

French actress (1928–2024)

- Born: Laurence Dolorès Badie-Lopes; 15 June 1928; Boulogne-Billancourt, France
- Died: 11 January 2024 (aged 95); Morlaix, France
- Occupation: Actress
- Years active: 1952–2024

Laurence Badie (15 June 1928 – 11 January 2024) was a French actress. She appeared in more than 100 films since 1952. Badie died on 11 January 2024, at the age of 95.

Badie was also a prolific voice actress, having voiced Velma Dinkley in the Scooby-Doo franchise until the mid-1990s, and Casper the Friendly Ghost in the 1950s animated shorts.

== Selected filmography ==
Year	Title	Role	Notes
1952	Forbidden Games		
1953	The Virtuous Scoundrel		
1953	Follow That Man		
1954	Les Impures		
1956	La Traversée de Paris		
1963	Muriel		
1963	Enough Rope		
1964	The Soft Skin		
1967	Woman Times Seven		
1970	Cannabis		
1974	How to Make Good When One Is a Jerk and a Crybaby		
1982	Bankers Also Have Souls		
2015	The law of Alexandre	Madame Timbaut	TV series (1 episode)
