= René Renoux =

French art director (1904–2000)

- Born: 21 November 1904; Brest, Finistère, France
- Died: March 2000 (aged 95)
- Occupation: Art director
- Years active: 1930-1972 (film)

René Renoux (1904–2000) was a French art director.

== Selected filmography ==
- The Pure Truth (1931)
- Topaze (1933)
- Prince Jean (1934)
- The Lady of the Camellias (1934)
- Speak to Me of Love (1935)
- Dédé (1935)
- Vertigo (1935)
- The Hortensia Sisters (1935)
- The Pont-Biquet Family (1935)
- Lucrezia Borgia (1935)
- You Can't Fool Antoinette (1936)
- The Bureaucrats (1936)
- Madelon's Daughter (1937)
- The President (1938)
- Four in the Morning (1938)
- The Gutter (1938)
- Berlingot and Company (1939)
- Midnight Tradition (1939)
- Grandfather (1939)
- First Ball (1941)
- Last Adventure (1942)
- Business Is Business (1942)
- The Woman I Loved Most (1942)
- Madly in Love (1943)
- Vautrin (1943)
- Father Goriot (1945)
- Roger la Honte (1946)
- The Captain (1946)
- The Visitor (1946)
- Pastoral Symphony (1946)
- The Lame Devil (1948)
- The Ironmaster (1948)
- To the Eyes of Memory (1948)
- Cage of Girls (1949)
- Doctor Laennec (1949)
- At the Grand Balcony (1949)
- The Ladies in the Green Hats (1949)
- The Treasure of Cantenac (1950)
- God Needs Men (1950)
- Savage Triangle (1951)
- Tomorrow We Get Divorced (1951)
- Deburau (1951)
- Dirty Hands (1951)
- Clara de Montargis (1951)
- Love and Desire (1951)
- The Little Rebels (1955)
- Burning Fuse (1957)
- Guinguette (1959)
- Maigret and the Saint-Fiacre Case (1959)
- Imperial Venus (1962)
- Not Dumb, The Bird (1972)

== Bibliography ==
- Freddy Buache. Claude Autant-Lara. L'AGE D'HOMME, 1982.
