= Morigny =

- Commune
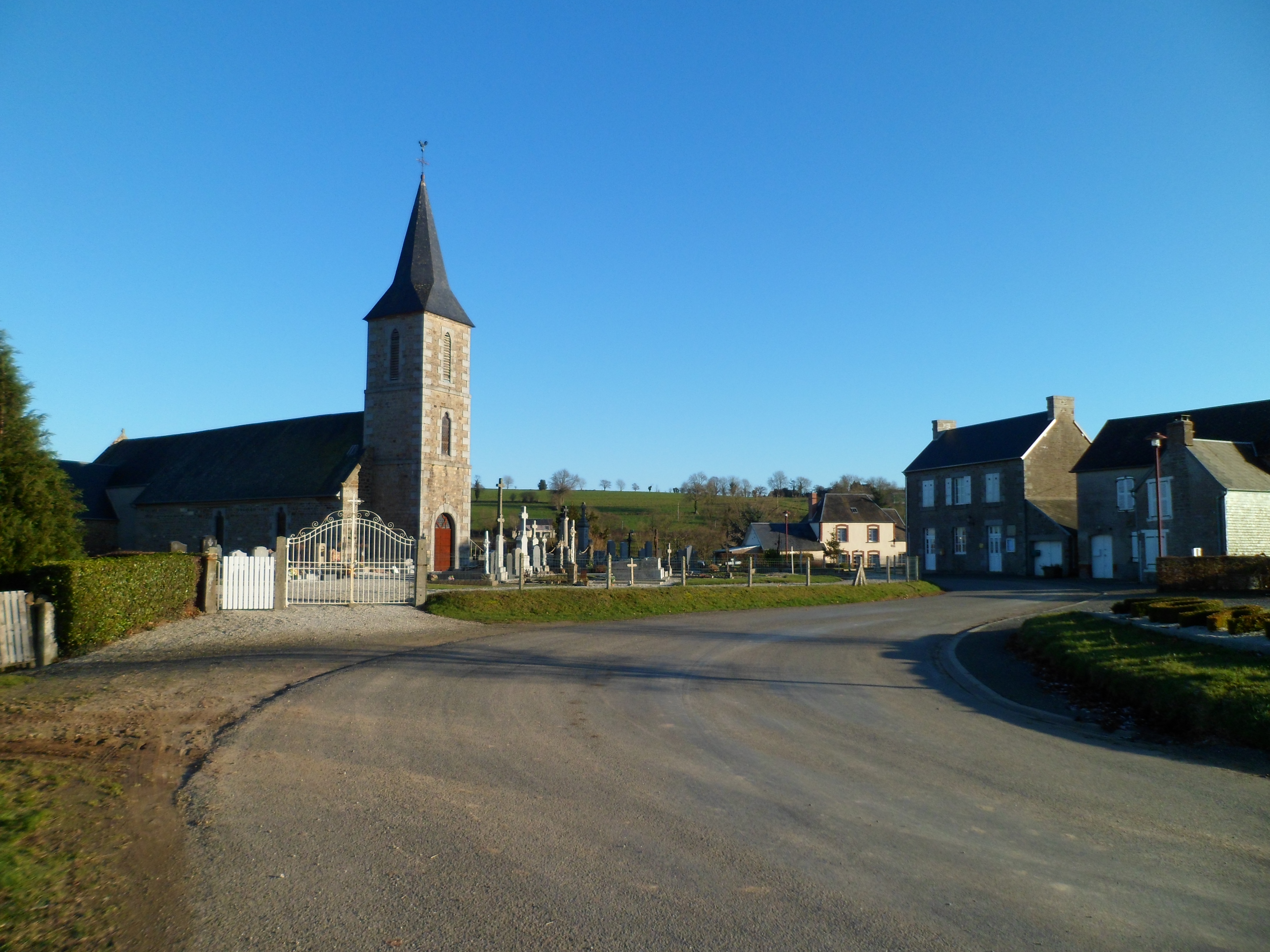
- The church and surroundings in Morigny
- Location of Morigny
- Location within France Location within Normandy
- Coordinates: 48°52′56″N 1°03′29″W
- Country: France
- Region: Normandy
- Department: Manche
- Arrondissement: Saint-Lô
- Canton: Villedieu-les-Poêles-Rouffigny
- Intercommunality: Villedieu Intercom

Government
  - Mayor (2020–2026): Alain Eudeline
- Area^{1}: 4.35 km^{2} (1.68 sq mi)
- Highest elevation: 163 m (535 ft)
- Lowest elevation: 77 m (253 ft)
- Population (2023): 70
  - Density: 16/km^{2} (42/sq mi)
- Demonym: Morignais
- Time zone: UTC+01:00 (CET)
  - Summer (DST): UTC+02:00 (CEST)
- INSEE/Postal code: 50357 /50410
- ^{1} French Land Register data, which excludes lakes, ponds, glaciers > 1 km^{2} (0.386 sq mi or 247 acres) and river estuaries.

Morigny (French pronunciation: [mɔʁiɲi]) is a commune in the Manche department in Normandy in north-western France.

== See also ==
- Communes of the Manche department
