= La Poison =

- Theatrical release poster
- Directed by: Sacha Guitry
- Written by: Sacha Guitry
- Produced by: Paul Wagner; Alain Poiré
- Starring: Michel Simon; Germaine Reuver
- Cinematography: Jean Bachelet
- Edited by: Raymond Lamy
- Music by: Louiguy
- Distributed by: Gaumont Distribution
- Release date: 30 November 1951
- Running time: 85 minutes
- Country: France
- Language: French

La Poison is a 1951 French comedy drama film, written and directed by Sacha Guitry, starring Michel Simon with Jean Debucourt and Germaine Reuver.

== Synopsis ==
Paul and Blandine Braconnier both have the same wish, to find a way of killing the other without being caught. She hits on rat poison, he, intrigued by a radio interview with a famous lawyer, decides to go to Paris to meet him. There he convinces the lawyer that he has already murdered his wife, and through the questions of the lawyer works out the best way to do it and get acquitted. On his return to the home town, their plans are put in place.

== Cast ==
- Michel Simon: Paul Louis Victor Braconnier, the gardener
- Germaine Reuver: Blandine Braconnier, Paul's wife
- Jean Debucourt: Maître Aubanel, the famous lawyer
- Louis de Funès: André Chevillard, a citizen of Remonville
- Marcelle Arnold: Germaine Chevillard, André's wife
- Georges Bever: Mr Gaillard, the chemist of Remonville
- Nicolas Amato: Victor Boitevin, an inhabitant
- Jacques Varennes: the prosecutor
- Jeanne Fusier-Gir: Mrs Tyberghen, the florist
- Pauline Carton: Mrs Michaud, the grocer
- Albert Duvaleix: Abbot Méthivier
- Léon Walther: a senior magistrate
- Henry Laverne: Judiciary President
- Harry Max: Henri, an inhabitant

== Production ==
Guitry was determined to have Michel Simon in his film and asked the actor how he could make his participation satisfactory; Simon replied that he wanted only one take for his scenes. Guitry explained this to the technical crew, and this happened due to meticulous preparation by crew and actors. Three cameras were used for the takes, except indoor dialogues where two were employed. All the sets were constructed in colour but filmed in black and white, in order to play the effect of their shades. Notably, in a film in which he did not act, the introductory credits take the form of physical introductions and thanks by Guitry to each of the cast, the composer and key technical staff, even many of the extras. Filming was very short; a contemporary report stated "12 days and 3 hours" while Knapp gives nine days.

== Remake ==
The film was remade by Jean Becker as A Crime in Paradise in 2001.
