= Louiguy =

French musician (1916–1991)

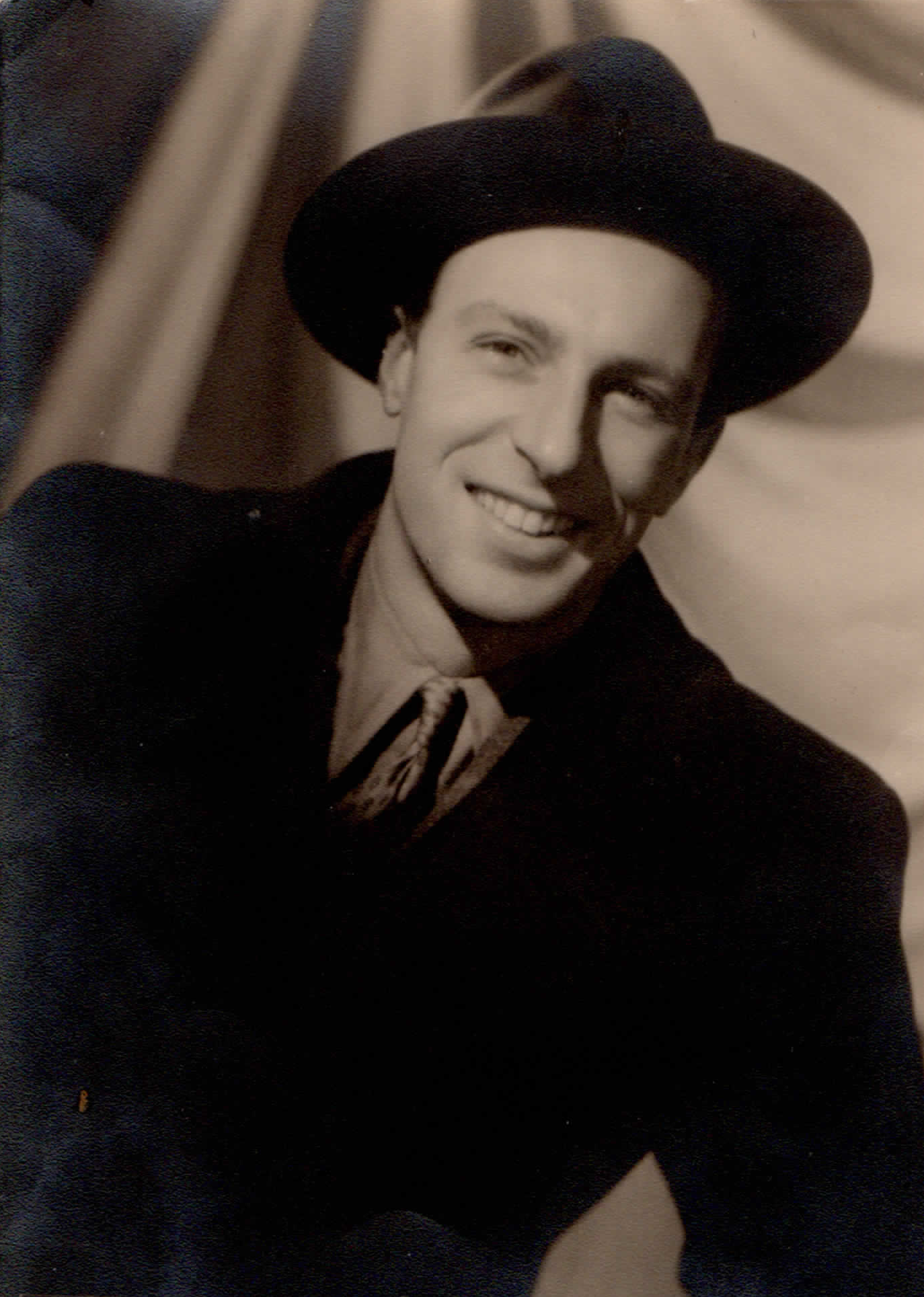

Background information
- Born: 3 April 1916; Barcelona, Spain
- Died: 4 April 1991 (aged 75) Vence, France
- Occupation: Composer
- Instrument: Piano

Louis Guglielmi (3 April 1916 – 4 April 1991), known by his pen name Louiguy (French pronunciation: [lwiɡi]), was a French musician of Italian origin. He wrote the melody for Édith Piaf's lyrics of "La Vie en rose" and the Latin jazz composition "Cerisier rose et pommier blanc", a popular song written in 1950, made famous in English as "Cherry Pink (and Apple Blossom White)", which was recast as a resounding mambo hit for Pérez Prado.

Guglielmi, whose Italian father was a musician in Toscanini's Orchestra, was born in Barcelona and lived there till the age of 7. He then studied music at the Conservatoire de Paris in the same class as Maurice Baquet, Henri Betti, Paul Bonneau and Henri Dutilleux. He created almost three dozen film scores, beginning in 1946 with La Rose de la mer and including To Die of Love (1971). Among the last was the score for Jean Gabin's final gangster flick, Verdict (1974). He died in Vence, one day after his 75th birthday.

== Selected filmography ==
- A Cop (1947)
- City of Hope (1948)
- Memories Are Not for Sale (1948)
- The Heroic Monsieur Boniface (1949)
- Toâ (1949)
- Two Doves (1949)
- The Treasure of Cantenac (1950)
- The Atomic Monsieur Placido (1950)
- One Only Loves Once (1950)
- Dakota 308 (1951)
- Tomorrow We Get Divorced (1951)
- Adhémar (1951)
- Village Feud (1951)
- The Sleepwalker (1951)
- The Happiest of Men (1952)
- Boum sur Paris (1953)
- Little Jacques (1953)
- The Tour of the Grand Dukes (1953)
- At the Order of the Czar (1954)
- Dangerous Turning (1954)
- The Heroes Are Tired (1955)
- Lord Rogue (1955)
- The Price of Love (1955)
- The Wheel (1957)
- An Eye for an Eye (1957)
- Ramuntcho (1959)
- Les Tortillards (1960)
