= Jeanne Fusier-Gir =

French actress (1885–1973)

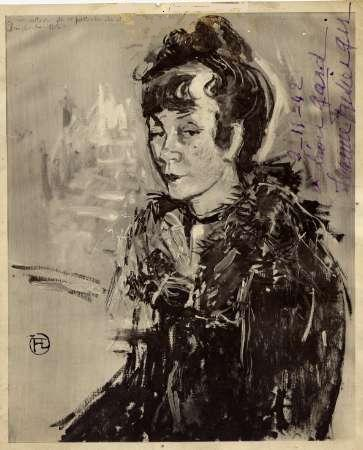
- Born: 27 April 1885; Paris, France
- Died: 24 April 1973 (aged 87); Maisons-Laffitte, Yvelines, France
- Other name: Jeanne Fusier
- Occupation: Actress
- Years active: 1909–1967 (film & TV)

Jeanne Fusier-Gir (1885–1973) was a French stage and film actress. She was married to the painter Charles Gir, and was the mother of the film director François Gir.

== Selected filmography ==
- The Crime of Sylvestre Bonnard (1929)
- Chérie (1930)
- The Man in Evening Clothes (1931)
- Luck (1931)
- The Devil's Holiday (1931)
- When Do You Commit Suicide? (1931)
- Beauty Spot (1932)
- Aces of the Turf (1932)
- The Champion Cook (1932)
- That Scoundrel Morin (1932)
- The Fish Woman (1932)
- Make-Up (1932)
- Nothing But Lies (1933)
- The Heir of the Bal Tabarin (1933)
- The Midnight Prince (1934)
- Crainquebille (1934)
- Return to Paradise (1935)
- The Decoy (1935)
- Divine (1935)
- Marinella (1936)
- A Hen on a Wall (1936)
- Excursion Train (1936)
- The Citadel of Silence (1937)
- Cinderella (1937)
- Blanchette (1937)
- Claudine at School (1937)
- Life Dances On (1937)
- Boulot the Aviator (1937)
- Miarka (1937)
- The Man of the Hour (1937)
- Gargousse (1938)
- My Priest Among the Rich (1938)
- Whirlwind of Paris (1939)
- The Path of Honour (1939)
- Place de la Concorde (1939)
- Fire in the Straw (1939)
- Narcisse (1940)
- Sins of Youth (1941)
- The Blue Veil (1942)
- Le Corbeau (1942)
- The Guardian Angel (1942)
- Marie-Martine (1943)
- My Last Mistress (1943)
- Paris Frills (1945)
- Pamela (1945)
- The Martyr of Bougival (1949)
- Toâ (1949)
- Two Loves (1949)
- Millionaires for One Day (1949)
- The Voice of Dreams (1949)
- My Aunt from Honfleur (1949)
- Miquette (1950)
- The Treasure of Cantenac (1950)
- Blonde (1950)
- Death Threat (1950)
- My Seal and Them (1951)
- My Friend Oscar (1951)
- The Billionaire Tramp (1951)
- Deburau (1951)
- Crazy for Love (1952)
- Love, Madame (1952)
- The Priest of Saint-Amour (1952)
- Women Are Angels (1952)
- Monsieur Taxi (1952)
- The Cucuroux Family (1953)
- Quintuplets in the Boarding School (1953)
- Wonderful Mentality (1953)
- When Do You Commit Suicide? (1953)
- The Congress of Mother-in-Laws (1954)
- Thirteen at the Table (1955)
- Fruits of Summer (1955)
- The Red Cloak (1955)
- Mannequins of Paris (1956)
- The Seventh Commandment (1957)
- The Crucible (1957)
- The Lord's Vineyard (1958)
- The Gardener of Argenteuil (1966)

== Bibliography ==
- Philippe Rège. Encyclopedia of French Film Directors, Volume 1. Scarecrow Press, 2009.
