= Napoléon (1955 film) =

- Directed by: Sacha Guitry
- Written by: Sacha Guitry
- Produced by: Clément Duhour; Angelo Rizzoli
- Starring: Daniel Gélin; Raymond Pellegrin; Michèle Morgan; Maria Schell; Sacha Guitry
- Cinematography: Pierre Montazel
- Edited by: Raymond Lamy
- Music by: Jean Françaix
- Production companies: Filmsonor; Francinex; Les Films C.L.M.
- Distributed by: Cinédis
- Release date: 25 March 1955 (France)
- Running time: 190 minutes
- Countries: France; Italy
- Language: French
- Budget: $1.5 million—$1.8 million
- Box office: 5,405,252 admissions (France)

Napoléon is a 1955 French historical epic film written and directed by Sacha Guitry, which depicts major events in the life of Napoleon (Daniel Gélin as a young man, Raymond Pellegrin in later life; the switch takes place during a scene at a barber).

Guitry played the role of Talleyrand, controversial diplomat and first Prime Minister of France, narrating from a drawing room as if having just heard of Napoleon's death on the island of Saint Helena in 1821. The cast also features Yves Montand as Marshal Lefebvre, Maria Schell as Marie-Louise of Austria, Erich von Stroheim as Ludwig van Beethoven, and Orson Welles as Napoleon's British jailor, Sir Hudson Lowe.

The English dub was made as part of the original production, but is significantly shorter than the French version.

== Plot ==
The film follows the life of Napoleon from his early life in Corsica to his death at Saint Helena in May 1821. The film is notable for its use of location shooting for numerous scenes, especially at the French estates of Malmaison and Fontainebleau, the Palace of Versailles, and sites of Napoleonic battles including Austerlitz and Waterloo.

== Cast ==
- Jean-Pierre Aumont as Michel-Louis-Étienne Regnaud de Saint-Jean d'Angély
- Jeanne Boitel as Madame de Dino
- Daniel Gélin as Young Napoleon
- Raymond Pellegrin as Older Napoleon
- Sacha Guitry as Talleyrand
- Michèle Morgan as Joséphine de Beauharnais
- Danielle Darrieux as Eléonore Denuelle
- Maria Schell as Marie-Louise of Austria
- Lana Marconi as Marie Walewska
- Dany Robin as Désirée Clary
- Michèle Cordoue as Julie Clary
- Patachou as Madame Sans-Gêne
- Micheline Presle as Hortense de Beauharnais
- Gianna Maria Canale as Pauline Bonaparte
- Clément Duhour as Marshal Ney
- Henri Vidal as Joachim Murat
- Serge Reggiani as Lucien Bonaparte
- Jean Marais as Montholon
- Lucien Baroux as Louis XVIII
- Pierre Brasseur as Barras
- Jean Chevrier as Geraud Duroc
- Maurice Escande as Louis XV
- Noël Roquevert as Cambronne
- Jean Gabin as Lannes
- Yves Montand as Lefebvre
- O. W. Fischer as Metternich
- Erich von Stroheim as Ludwig van Beethoven
- Orson Welles as Hudson Lowe
- Jacques Dumesnil as Jean-Baptiste Bernadotte
- Howard Vernon as Lord Liverpool
- Fernand Fabre as Francis I
- Judith Magre (uncredited) as a Merveilleuse
- Marcel Journet as Choiseul
