= Sacha Guitry =

French actor, director, screenwriter, and playwright (1885–1957)

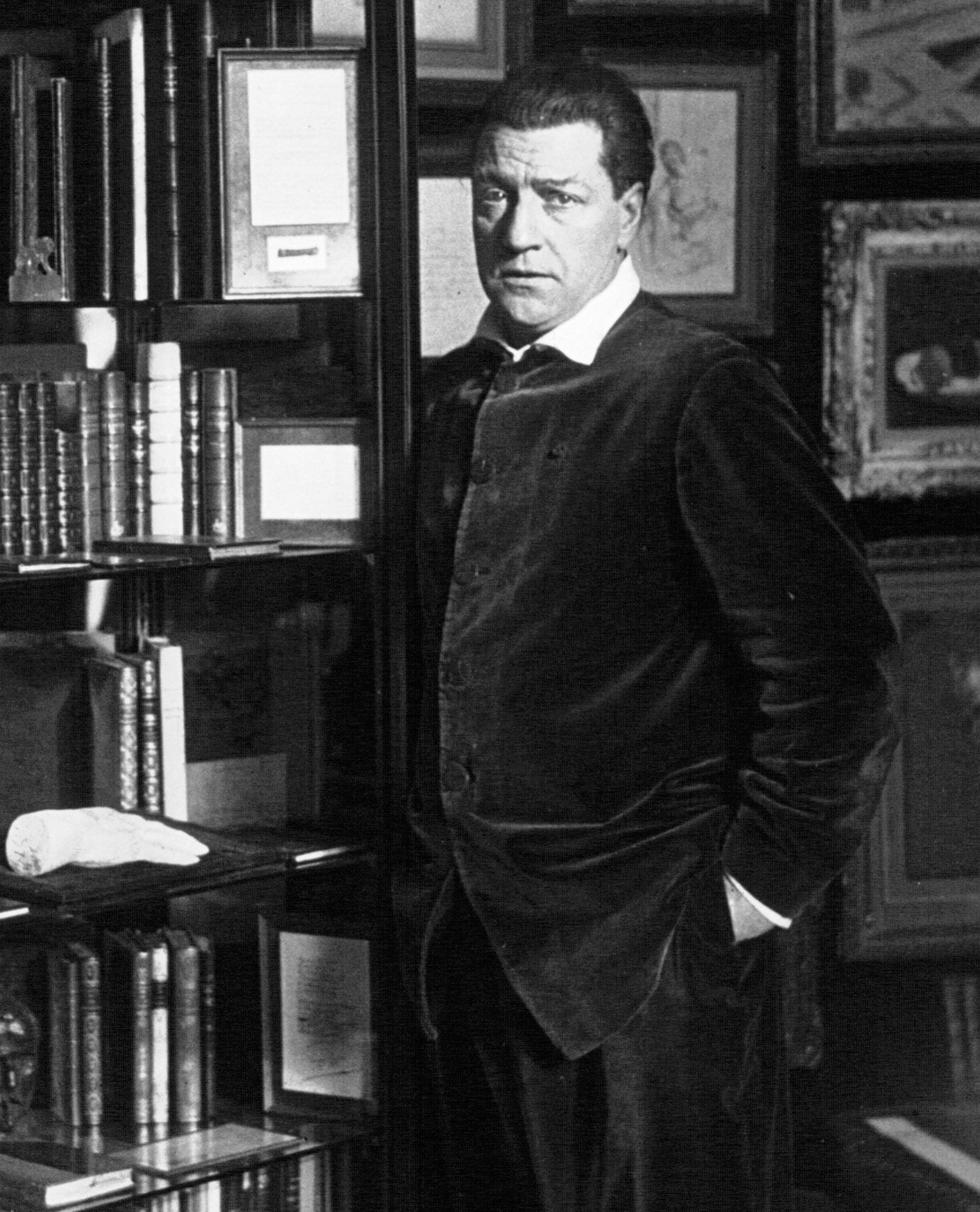
- Sacha Guitry in 1931
- Born: Alexandre-Pierre Georges Guitry; 21 February 1885; Saint Petersburg, Russian Empire
- Died: 24 July 1957 (aged 72); Paris, France
- Occupations: Actor, playwright, impresario, screenwriter, film director
- Years active: 1902–1957
- Spouses: Charlotte Lysès (m. 1907; div. 1915) Yvonne Printemps (m. 1919; div. 1932) Jacqueline Delubac (m. 1935; div. 1939) Geneviève de Séréville (m. 1944; div. 1949) Lana Marconi (m. 1949)

Alexandre-Pierre Georges "Sacha" Guitry (French: [gitʁi]; 21 February 1885 – 24 July 1957) was a French stage actor, film actor, director, screenwriter, and playwright of the boulevard theatre. He was the son of a leading French actor, Lucien Guitry, and followed his father into the theatrical profession. He became known for his stage performances, particularly in boulevardier roles. He was also a prolific playwright, writing 115 plays throughout his career. He was married five times, always to rising actresses whose careers he furthered. Probably his best-known wife was Yvonne Printemps to whom he was married between 1919 and 1932.

Guitry's plays range from historical dramas to contemporary light comedies. Some have incidental music by composers including André Messager and Reynaldo Hahn. When silent films became popular Guitry avoided them, finding the lack of spoken dialogue fatal to dramatic impact. From the 1930s to the end of his life he enthusiastically embraced the cinema, making as many as five films in a single year.

The later years of Guitry's career were overshadowed by accusations of collaborating with the occupying Germans after the capitulation of France in the Second World War. The charges were dismissed, but Guitry, a strongly patriotic man, was disillusioned by the vilification he received from some of his compatriots. By the time of his death, his popular esteem had been restored to the extent that 12,000 people filed past his coffin before his burial in Paris.

== Life and career ==
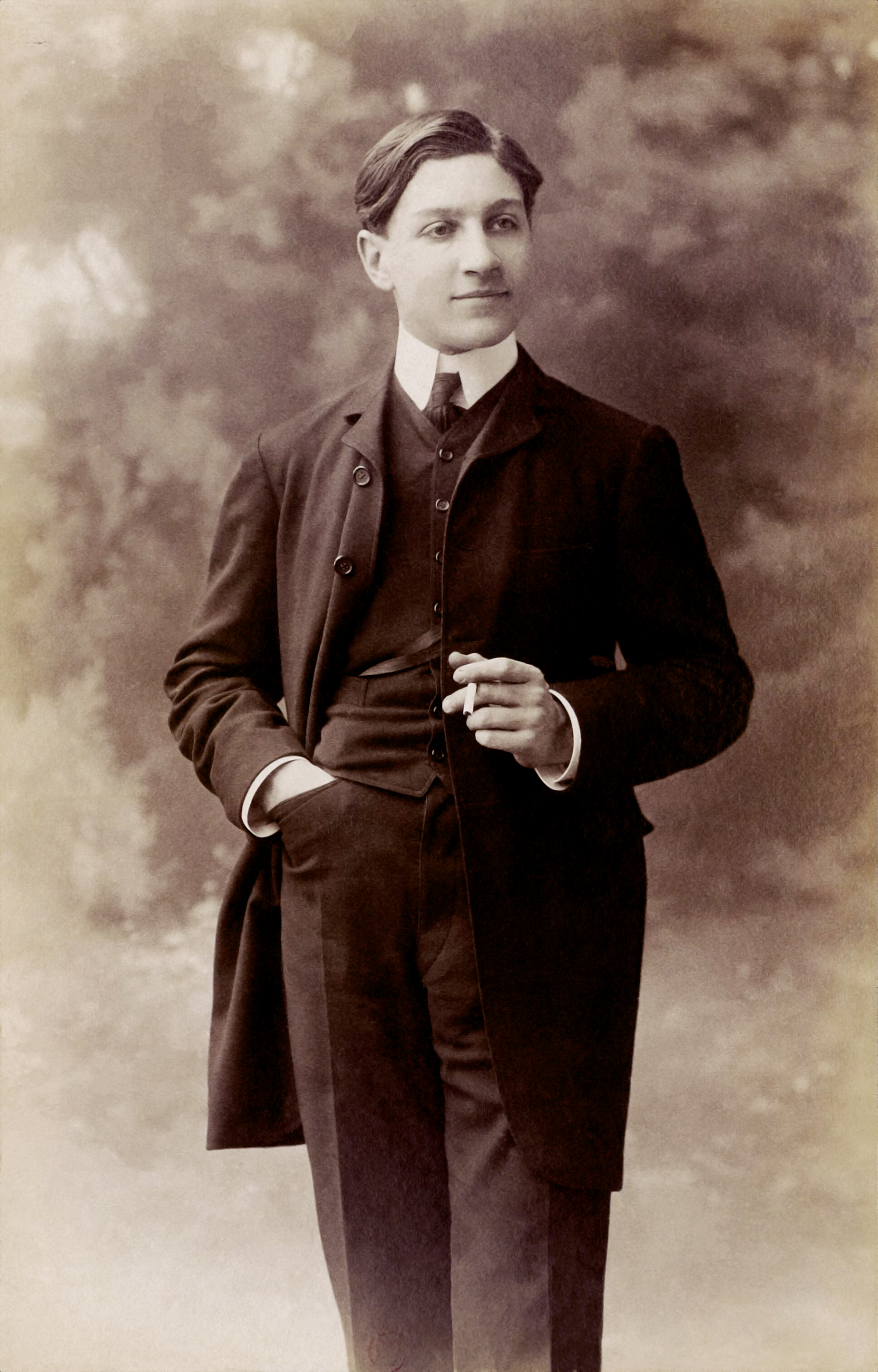
The young Sacha Guitry, photographed by Nadar at the very beginning of the 20th century.

=== Early years ===
Guitry was born at No 12 Nevsky Prospect, Saint Petersburg, Russia, the third son of the French actors Lucien Guitry and his wife Marie-Louise-Renée née Delmas de Pont-Jest (1858–1902). The couple had eloped, in the face of family disapproval, and were married at St Martin in the Fields, London, in 1882. They then moved to the then Russian capital, where Lucien ran the French theatre company, the Théâtre Michel, from 1882 to 1891. The marriage was brief. Guitry senior was a persistent adulterer, and his wife instituted divorce proceedings in 1888. Two of their sons died in infancy (one in 1883 and the other in 1887); the other surviving son, Jean (1884–1920) became an actor and journalist. The family's Russian nurse habitually shortened Alexandre-Pierre's name to the Russian diminutive "Sacha", by which he was known all his life. The young Sacha made his stage debut in his father's company at the age of five.

Lucien Guitry, considered the most distinguished actor in France since Coquelin, was immensely successful, both critically and commercially. When he returned to Paris he lived in a flat in a prestigious spot, overlooking the Place Vendôme and the Rue de la Paix. The young Sacha lived there, and for his schooling he was first sent to the well-known Lycée Janson de Sailly in the fashionable Sixteenth arrondissement. He did not stay long there, and went to a succession of other schools, both secular and religious, before abandoning formal education at the age of sixteen.

After giving up school Guitry embarked on a career as a playwright with a little musical piece called Le Page, with a score by Ludo Ratz, premiered at the Théâtre des Mathurins on 15 April 1902. Eighteen months later he joined his father's company at the Théâtre de la Renaissance. At first he appeared under the stage name "Lorcey"; the pseudonym deceived no-one, as the press immediately announced the debutant's real identity. His first role was in L'Escalier, by Maurice Donnay in November 1904. He fell out with his father over what the latter saw as Guitry's lack of professionalism. In the aftermath of their quarrel they neither saw nor spoke to one another.

A member of Lucien Guitry's company was a young actress, Charlotte-Augustine-Hortense Lejeune, whose stage name was Charlotte Lysès (1877–1956). In April 1905, she and Sacha set up home together in the rue d'Anjou (now the rue du Faubourg Saint-Honoré). For her he wrote his play, Le KWTZ, premiered in December 1905 at the Théâtre des Capucins. In the same month he had his first substantial hit with Nono at the Mathurins. When the leading man in Guitry's 1906 play Chez les Zoaques fell ill the author took over, and in the words of a critic, "proved to be his own definitive interpreter". The pattern of his career was set: he remained an actor-author, and later manager, for the rest of his life.

=== Rise to prominence ===
With Yvonne Printemps, 1922

For the next five years, Guitry's plays were, at best, moderate successes, but he then had five consecutive hits with Le Veilleur de nuit (1911), Un Beau mariage (1912), Le Prise de Berg-op-Zoom (1912), La Pèlerine écossaise (1912), and Les Deux converts (1914), the last of which was staged by the Comédie-Française.

In 1915, Guitry made his first cinema film, (Note: The previous year he had made a film for his family, Oscar rencontre Mlle Mamageot; it lasted less than four minutes and remained unpublished.) Ceux de chez nous ("Those of our home"), a short patriotic piece that celebrated great French men and women of the day, including Sarah Bernhardt, Anatole France, Claude Monet, Pierre-Auguste Renoir, Auguste Rodin, Edmond Rostand and Camille Saint-Saëns. He was not greatly attracted by the medium of silent film, regarding dialogue as the essence of drama; he did not make a full-length film until 1935. In 1915, he met the young singer Yvonne Printemps, with whom he began an affair that led Charlotte to leave him and obtain a divorce. Guitry started to write leading roles for Printemps some musical and others straight comedies.

=== With Printemps ===
Guitry was reconciled with his father in 1918. Lucien appeared in many productions with his son and Printemps, including Mon Père avait raison and Comment on ecrit l'histoire. They played together not only in Paris, but in the West End of London. All three appeared at the Aldwych Theatre in a four-week season in 1920. Sir John Gielgud wrote that Printemps and her husband "returned … many times to delight London in various pieces artfully contrived by him to show them both off to the best possible advantage."

Guitry and Printemps in Mozart (1925)

Guitry developed a charming, witty stage persona, often appearing in period-dress light comedies, for instance his 1925 pastiche Mozart, about the young Wolfgang Amadeus Mozart on a visit to Paris. To compose the score he approached André Messager, with whom he had successfully collaborated in 1923 on a show for Printemps, L'amour masqué. Messager was unavailable and recommended the composer Reynaldo Hahn, who accepted the commission. The resulting production took some liberties with historical accuracy, but it proved highly popular. Printemps, in a breeches role, played and sang the young Mozart, with Guitry as the composer's patron, Baron Grimm. Gielgud recalled, "She seemed ravishingly youthful and touching in her powdered wig, black knee breeches and buckled shoes, while Sacha hovered over her with avuncular authority, not attempting to try to sing himself, but contributing a kind of flowing, rhythmic accompaniment with his speeches, delivered in a deep caressing voice." After playing successfully at the Théâtre Edouard VII, the company presented the piece for a three-week season in London in June and July 1926. (Note: The critic James Agate wrote, "It is not exaggerating to say that on Monday evening people were observed to cry, and by that I mean shed tears, when Music's heavenly child appeared at the top of the stairs. At that moment of her entrance this exquisite artist made conquest of the house, and subsequently held it in thrall until the final curtain.") After the London production, Guitry and Printemps took the piece to Broadway, Boston and Montreal in late 1926 and early 1927. They returned to the US and Canada in 1929.

In 1931, Guitry was awarded the Legion of Honour, and the following year he marked thirty years on the stage with a banquet, with dishes named after some of his greatest successes. Later in 1932, his marriage to Printemps broke up. He took a six-month break from the theatre, returning in April 1933 in Châteaux en Espagne, which co-starred his new protégée, Jacqueline Delubac, whom he married on his fiftieth birthday. During the 1930s, he turned his attention once more to the cinema, as writer, director and star, while not neglecting his theatrical career. Sheridan Morley comments that in 1936 alone Guitry made five films and also wrote five plays. Among the latter was his hundredth play, Le Mot de Cambronne.

=== Later years ===
In 1938, Guitry wrote a one-act play, Dieu sauve le roi, to mark the state visit to Paris of George VI; the play was given in front of the king and queen at the Elysée Palace. When President Lebrun made a reciprocal visit to London the following year, Guitry wrote a short comedy in English, You're Telling Me, in which the author and Sir Seymour Hicks starred at a command performance and for a limited run after it.

As the war approached, Guitry managed to do something which would be of far greater significance. On 16 August 1939, when visiting London, Guitry smuggled over a replica Enigma machine supplied by the Biuro Szyfrow and bound for Bletchley Park.

His next play, Un Monde fou was his last to feature Delubac, who, in Morley's phrase, "could no longer bear living with a jealous workaholic". Within months of her leaving him, he married for a fourth time; his new wife was Geneviève de Séréville, who had been in the cast of his London play.

Guitry's career was affected by the Nazi occupation of France. He continued to work both on stage and in the cinema under the Nazis. Although this gave him the opportunity to help many of his compatriots, it also brought accusations of collaborating with the enemy. He conceived his book and associated film, De 1429 à 1942 ou De Jeanne d'Arc à Philippe Pétain ("1429 to 1942, or Joan of Arc to Philippe Pétain") as a tribute to France's past glories, but many saw it as honouring the collaborationist president of Vichy France, Marshal Pétain. In 1944, Guitry's fourth wife left him. In 1942, Guitry was named on a list of French collaborators with Germany to be killed during the war, or tried after it.

On the liberation of France, Guitry was among the first arrested, by a Resistance militia. He was interned in a detention camp at Drancy, and suffered ill-effects on his health that necessitated his transfer to a Paris nursing home. The criminal charges were dropped for lack of evidence, and the experience left him disillusioned.

In 1947, Guitry married for the fifth and final time; he was sixty-two and his bride, Lana Marconi, was twenty-eight. He was permitted to resume working in the theatre in 1948, when he returned to the Paris stage with Le Diable boiteux. For the London season in 1953, celebrating the coronation of Elizabeth II, Guitry starred at the Winter Garden in Ecoutez bien, messieurs, a comedy in which he played a voluble Frenchman reduced to baffled silence by an even more voluble Englishwoman, played (in English) by Heather Thatcher. Later in the same year he made his last stage appearance in Paris in Palsambleu. He continued to make films until 1957, when he suffered a disabling disease of the nervous system.

Guitry died in Paris on 24 July 1957, aged 72. Twelve thousand people filed past his coffin, and he was buried, like his father, in the Montmartre Cemetery, Paris.

=== Quotes ===
The fatal thing about paradise is that you can only reach it in a hearse.

Being rich doesn't mean having money, it means spending money.

If one could understand women, much of their magic would be lost.

Flirtation is the art of falling into a woman's arms without falling into her hands.

== Legacy and reputation ==
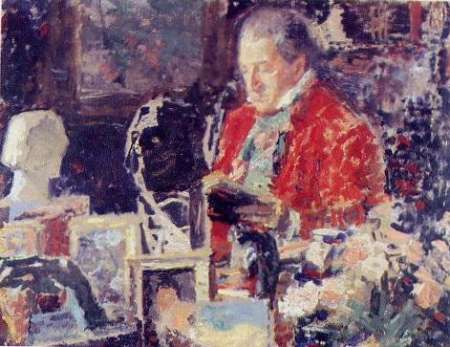
Guitry by Léon Gard

Critical re-assessment has been prompted by reissues of Guitry's films. In 2011, an auction of Guitry memorabilia, including manuscripts, drawings, paintings and photographs, was held at the Drouot-Richelieu in Paris; with more than eight hundred items, it was considered the most important collection of material relating to Guitry since the playwright's death.

In an obituary, The Manchester Guardian commented:

It may be objected that in all the work of Sacha Guitry there is nothing nearer to idealism than an occasional pretty fancy in sentiment – a sentiment which was always entirely mundane and as entirely selfish as sentiment can well be. It may be objected that characters are nearly always trivial. and their motives at least sensual when they are not base; that his world is inhabited by an idle, cynical, and pretty disreputable crew; that he is obviously contemptuous of his audience, and that his plays are composed with a carelessness which argues a very frail artistic conscience, while literary purists can prove that the language in which they are written is execrable French. It may be objected that all he did as an author was to exploit, with some agility and discretion, his own limited gifts as a performer and the gifts, also limited, of his five successive wives – although the success of Le Blanc et le Noir and other plays, in which neither he nor any of his wives acted, is enough to disprove this last charge. Indeed, there are answers to many of the objections which have been made. For instance, Pasteur and Un Sujet de Roman are based on themes by no means trivial and are developed with sincerity and power. At the same time, most of the objections are well founded, and it is with all the weight of their truth against him that Sacha Guitry remained a great artist.

== Selected filmography ==
Year	Film	Actor	Director	Screenwriter	Notes
1935	Pasteur	Yes	Yes	Yes	Co-directed with Fernand Rivers
1936	The New Testament	Yes	Yes	Yes	
1936	Le roman d'un tricheur	Yes	Yes	Yes	Nominated for Best Foreign Film at Venice Film Festival (Mussolini Cup)
1936	My Father Was Right	Yes	Yes	Yes	
1936	Let's Make a Dream	Yes	Yes	Yes	
1937	Désiré	Yes	Yes	Yes	
1937	The Pearls of the Crown	Yes	Yes	Yes	Winner of the Best Foreign Screenplay award with co-writer Christian-Jaque and nominated as Best Foreign Film at Venice Film Festival (Mussolini Cup)
1938	Quadrille	Yes	Yes	Yes	
1938	Remontons les Champs-Élysées	Yes	Yes	Yes	
1943	My Last Mistress	Yes	Yes	Yes	
1949	Two Doves	Yes	Yes	Yes	
1951	Deburau	Yes	Yes	Yes	
1951	La Poison		Yes	Yes	
1953	The Virtuous Scoundrel	Appears as himself	Yes	Yes	
1954	Royal Affairs in Versailles		Yes	Yes	
1955	Napoléon		Yes	Yes	
1956	If Paris Were Told to Us		Yes	Yes	
1956	Assassins and Thieves	No	Yes	Yes	

=== Film adaptations ===
- The Lover of Camille, directed by Harry Beaumont (USA, 1924, based on the play Deburau)
- Sleeping Partners, directed by Seymour Hicks (UK, 1930, based on the play Let's Make a Dream)
- Black and White, directed by Marc Allégret and Robert Florey (France, 1931, based on the play Le Blanc et le Noir)
- Beaumarchais (1996, based on his play)
- A Crime in Paradise (2001, remake of La Poison)

== Notes and references ==
Notes

== Sources ==
- Bernard, André; Alain Paucard (2002). Sacha Guitry (in French). Lausanne and Paris: l'Âge d'homme. ISBN 2825114618.
- Engelson, Thea Sikora (2006). The Mélodies of Reynaldo Hahn. Iowa City: University of Iowa. OCLC 71557849.
- Harding, James (1968). Sacha Guitry: The Last Boulevardier. London: Methuen. OCLC 219454.
- Keit, Alain (1999). Le cinéma de Sacha Guitry. Liege: Céfal. ISBN 2871300704.
- Morley, Sheridan (1986). The Great Stage Stars. London: Angus & Robertson. ISBN 0816014019.
- Parker, John (1925). Who's Who in the Theatre (fifth ed.). London: Sir Isaac Pitman and Sons. OCLC 10013159.
- Sharland, Elizabeth (2006). A Theatrical Feast in Paris: From Molière to Deneuve. Lincoln: iUniverse. ISBN 0595374514.

== See also ==
- Plays and films of Sacha Guitry
