= Bouillon Chartier =

Coordinates: 48°52′24″N 2°20′37″E

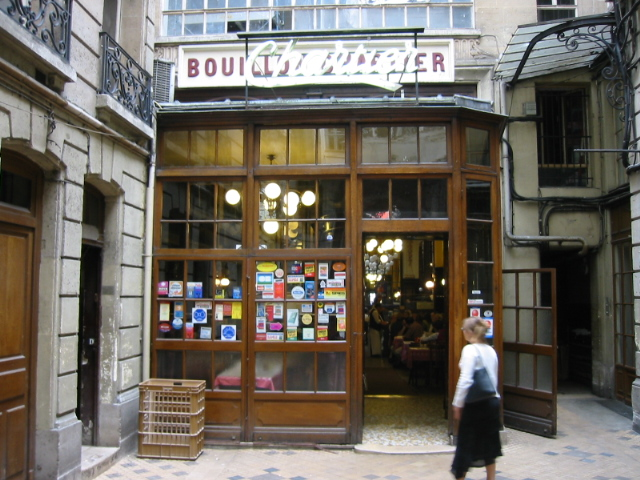
- View of entrance of Chartier.
- Interactive map of Bouillon Chartier

Restaurant information
- Established: 1896
- Food type: French
- Dress code: Casual
- Location: 7, Rue du Faubourg-Montmartre, Paris, France
- Reservations: No
- Website: bouillon-chartier.com

Bouillon Chartier (French pronunciation: [bujɔ̃ ʃaʁtje]), or simply Chartier, is a "bouillon" restaurant in Paris founded in 1896, located in the 9th arrondissement and classified as a monument historique since 1989.

== History ==
The restaurant was created in 1896 by two brothers, Frédéric and Camille Chartier, in a building resembling a railway station concourse. The long Belle Époque dining room has a high ceiling supported by large columns which allows for a mezzanine, where service is also provided.

It opened with the name "Le Bouillon" (lit. broth, or stock, but in this context, a type of brasserie; originally a cheap workers' eatery that served stew), near the Grands Boulevards, the Hôtel Drouot, the Musée Grévin, and the Palais de la Bourse. The restaurant has had only four owners since opening.

== Service ==
The restaurant is open 365 days a year with a menu offering traditional French cuisine. The table service is provided by waiting staff dressed in the traditional rondin, a tight-fitting black waistcoat with multiple pockets and a long white apron.

The restaurant's popularity leads to lines in the courtyard or under the porch and sometimes on the pavement outside. Tables are shared between strangers. The bill is written directly on the disposable paper tablecloth at the end of the meal. Serving stops at 11:30 PM.

== In popular culture ==
- The restaurant is mentioned in Albert Willemetz's 1939 song "Félicie aussi", sung by Fernandel.
- In his novel Les Beaux Quartiers, Louis Aragon mentions Le Bouillon Chartier: the young medical student character Edmond Barbentane has lunch there regularly.
- A description of dining at Le Bouillon Chartier in the early 1970s is given by John Adamson in the book Footloose in France.

== See also ==
- List of tourist attractions in Paris
