= Fabrice Carré =

French playwright and librettist

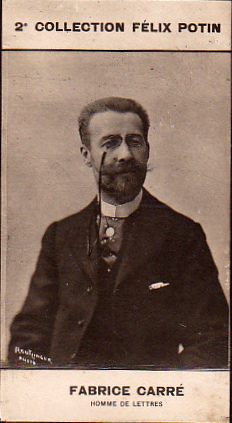
CFP Carré, Fabrice

Fabrice Carré or Carré-Labrousse, real name Jules Fabrice, (9 July 1855 in the 6th arrondissement of Paris – 1921) was a 19th-century French playwright, and librettist. The dramatist Fabrice Labrousse (1806-1876) was his grandson.

After studying law, he worked as a journalist before turning to the theater. He was the author, alone or in collaboration, especially with Paul Ferrier, of many comédies en vaudeville and operetta librettos, the best known being Joséphine vendue par ses sœurs (1886), music by Victor Roger, L'Enlèvement de la Toledad (1894) and Monsieur Lohengrin (1896), music by Edmond Audran.

== Works ==
Theatre

- 1882: Une aventure de Garrick, comedy in 1 act and in verse, with Pierre Fernay Théâtre de l'Odéon (15 March)
- 1882: La Nuit de noces de P. L. M., one-act comedy, Théâtre des Variétés (10 December)
- 1885: Un duel, s'il vous plaît !, three-act comedy, Théâtre de la Renaissance (11 November)
- 1885: Flagrant Délit, one-act comedy, Variétés (10 January)
- 1886: Le Voyage au Caucase, three-act comedy, with Émile Blavet, Renaissance (29 November)
- 1887: Nos bons Jurés, three-act comedy, with Paul Ferrier, Variétés (5 December)
- 1888: Ma femme est docteur ! one-act comedy, Renaissance (5 Mai)
- 1890: Le Roman d'une conspiration, drama in 5 acts and 8 tableaux, with Henry Fouquier, Théâtre de l'Ambigu (18 April)
- 1891: Mon oncle Barbassou, four-act fantasy comedy, with Émile Blavet, Théâtre du Gymnase (6 November)
- 1895: Monsieur le Directeur, three-act comedy, with Alexandre Bisson, Théâtre du Vaudeville (12 February)
- 1896: Le Prix de vertu, one-act comedy, Gymnase (21 October)
- 1899: Ma Bru ! three-act comedy, with Paul Bilhaud, Odéon (3 May)
- 1900: Une idée de mari, three-act comedy, Gymnase (15 October)
- 1900: Le Droit des époux, one-act comedy, Gymnase (15 October)

Libretti

- 1883: Mam'zelle Irma, one-act operetta, music by Victor Roger, casino de Trouville (August)
- 1886: Joséphine vendue par ses sœurs, opéra bouffe in 3 acts, with Paul Ferrier, music by Victor Roger, Théâtre des Bouffes-Parisiens (20 March)
- 1887: Les Délégués, vaudeville-opérette in 3 acts, with Émile Blavet, music by Antoine Banès, Théâtre des Nouveautés (28 November)
- 1889: Le Retour d'Ulysse, opérette bouffe in 3 acts, music by Raoul Pugno, Bouffes-Parisiens (1 February)
- 1890: La Vocation de Marius, vaudeville-opérette in 4 acts, with Albert Debelly, music by Raoul Pugno, Nouveautés (29 March)
- 1892: La Femme de Narcisse, three-act operetta, music by Louis Varney, Théâtre de la Renaissance (14 April)
- 1893: Mam'zelle Carabin, three-act operetta, music by Émile Pessard, Bouffes-Parisiens (3 November)
- 1894: L'Enlèvement de la Toledad, opérette bouffe in 3 acts, music by Edmond Audran, Bouffes-Parisiens (17 October)
- 1896: Monsieur Lohengrin, three-act operetta, music by Edmond Audran, Bouffes-Parisiens (30 November)
- 1898: La Petite Tache, vaudeville-opérette in 3 acts, music by Victor Roger, Bouffes-Parisiens (26 March)

other

- Rimes sans raison, Ghio, 1882
