= Paris sera toujours Paris =

1939 song by Maurice Chevalier

Song by Maurice Chevalier
- Released: 1939
- Songwriter(s): Albert Willemetz, Casimir Oberfeld

"Paris sera toujours Paris" (English: Paris will always be Paris) is a song by Maurice Chevalier released in 1939.

== Development and composition ==
The song was written by Albert Willemetz. and was released in 1939.

== Zaz version ==
=== Charts ===
Chart (2014)	Peak position
Belgium (Ultratip Bubbling Under Flanders)	27
Belgium (Ultratip Bubbling Under Wallonia)	21
France (SNEP)	48
