= Dédé (1935 film) =

1935 film

- Directed by: René Guissart
- Written by: Jean Boyer; Jacques Bousquet
- Based on: Dédé by Albert Willemetz
- Produced by: Henri Ullmann
- Cinematography: Charles Bauer; Fred Langenfeld
- Music by: Henri Christiné (operetta); Franz Waxman
- Production company: France Univers-Film
- Distributed by: Paramount Films
- Release date: 24 January 1935
- Running time: 75 minutes
- Country: France
- Language: French

Dédé is a 1935 French musical comedy film directed by René Guissart and starring Danielle Darrieux, Albert Préjean and Mireille Perrey. It is based on the 1921 operetta Dédé by Albert Willemetz with music by Henri Christiné, and is in the tradition of operetta films. The films sets were designed by the art directors Henri Ménessier and René Renoux.

== Synopsis ==
Robert is hired by his friend Dédé to manage a luxury shoe shop he has acquired, purely in order that he can have secret assignations with his mistress Odette there. Robert hires Denise as a head saleswoman and recruits showgirls as shop assistants, making a surprise success of the previously struggling store. To complicate matters Denise and Dédé fall in love, while Robert becomes enraptured with Odette.

== Cast ==
- Albert Préjean as Robert Dauvergne
- Danielle Darrieux as Denise
- Mireille Perrey as Odette Chausson
- Claude Dauphin as André 'Dédé' de la Huchette
- Pierre Piérade as Toto
- René Bergeron as Monsieur Chausson
- Gaston Orbal as Un gréviste
- Léonce Corne as L'orateur
- Nadia Sibirskaïa as La môme
- Yo Darven as Un amie d'Odette
- Cécile Lemaire as Un amie d'Odette
- Gaby Fontaine as Un amie d'Odette
- Dany Lorys as Une des deux poules
- Robert Hennery as Le commissaire
- Ginette Leclerc as Une des deux poules
- Louis Baron fils as Maître Leroydet

== Bibliography ==
- Goble, Alan. The Complete Index to Literary Sources in Film. Walter de Gruyter, 1999.
