= Phi-Phi =

Entrance to Phi-Phi's studio, from the 1922 London production

Phi-Phi is an opérette légère in three acts with music by Henri Christiné and a French libretto by Albert Willemetz and Fabien Solar. The piece was one which founded the new style of French comédie musicale, the first to really use the latest rhythms of jazz (one-step, fox trot) along with a plot which emphasised comedy – with risqué dialogue of puns and anachronisms – more than the romantic style, which had predominated before. The story concerns a sculptor, his wife, and their attractions to, respectively, a model and a prince, as well as a disastrous gambling loss by the sculptor's secretary.

The piece opened in 1918, running for three years. Its success of the piece prompted imitators in Paris such as Le petit Phi-Phi (3 March 1922) and Les amants de Phi-Phi (13 March 1923). It also led to a spate of similarly titled stage works: Clo-Clo, Dédé, You-You and Pan Pan. A 1922 London production, in English, was also successful.

== Performance history ==
Phi-Phi opened on 12 November 1918, directly after the end of the First World War, at the Bouffes-Parisiens. After about three months it became a major hit, running for three years. A Paris revival was very successful in 1979–80.

An English-language production premiered at the London Pavilion on 16 August 1922. It starred Stanley Lupino, Evelyn Laye, Arthur Roberts and Clifton Webb. The translation was by Fred Thompson and Clifford Grey, and the score included additional songs by Herman Darewski, Nat Ayer and Cole Porter.

A French film version was made in 1926, and it is still revived from time to time in France. It was recorded for French Radio in 1956.

== Roles ==
Role	Voice type	Premiere Cast, 12 November 1918 (Conductor: -)
Phidias, sculptor (Phi-Phi)	baritone	André Urban
Le Pirée, his servant	bass	Dréan
Pericles, a statesman	baritone	Michel Barré
Ardimédon, a foreign prince	tenor	Ferréal
Madame Phidias	mezzo-soprano	Pierrette Madd
Aspasie	soprano	Alice Cocéa
First dancer	-	Yvonne Vallée
Second dancer	-	Luce Wolter
First model	soprano	Biana Monti

== Synopsis ==
Setting : the workshop of Phidias in Greece, around 600 BC.

=== Act I ===
The sculptor Phidias (Phi-Phi) has received a commission to create a group representing 'L’amour et la Vertu fondent le Bonheur Domestique' ('Love and Virtue are the Foundation of Domestic Bliss'). After having looked over many models for 'la Vertu', he chooses Aspasie, a charming girl whom he had met in the streets of Athens. The girl pays him a visit, and he gets overcome by her attractions. Protecting herself from his advances with her umbrella, she breaks the arms off the Venus de Milo and the head from the Winged Victory of Samothrace.

Madame Phidias enters and makes jealous comments to her husband. Aspasie leaves. Alone with Le Pirée, secretary and confidant of her husband, Madame Phidias, as a faithful spouse, tells him how she had encountered a handsome young man who has been pursuing her. This is none other than Prince Ardimédon, who now enters. Embarrassed, Madame Phidias leaves Le Pirée with the prince; Phi-Phi returns and after trying to sell him some sculptures (and his wife) engages the young man as the model for 'L’Amour'.

=== Act II ===
Le Pirée having lost money at the races using Phidias’s sculptures as wagers, the models agree to pretend to be the works of art. Pericles makes a visit to the sculptor and with Phi-Phi away, meets Aspasie; he too is overcome by her charms. (Her song imitates the refrain of "Je suis toujours tout étourdie" from Manon).

Pericles leaves and Madame Phidias comes in. She quickly gets rid of Aspasie telling her that her husband has decided not to use her as a model. Madame Phidias believes that only she can truly represent ‘Vertu’, and reluctantly Phi-Phi agrees. Madame Phidias takes her place beside Ardimédon, but the sculptor is called away, and the prince leads his virtuous partner off to a room nearby.

=== Act III ===
Next day back in his studio Phi-Phi finds Ardimédon and his wife in each other’s arms. He commends them for finding such an ideal pose for his sculpture and sets to work, all the while surprised that his wife has not asked him where he was all night.

Aspasie enters and tells Phi-Phi that she is to marry Pericles but will continue her liaison with Phi-Phi that was consummated the previous night. When Pericles arrives he demands that Aspasie be included as one of the models for the sculpture – as 'L’Economie' (thrift), and the work will become "L'Amour et la Vertu, aidés par l'Economie, fondent le bonheur conjugal". After some machinations by Le Pirée to recoup his financial losses, all ends happily.
