= Fine dining =

Type of restaurant

Interior of Bistro Nas

Inteior of The French Laundry

Fine dining is a high-end culinary experience focused on refined details. This can include exceptional quality of the food, the elegance of the ambiance, and the attentiveness of the service.

Fine dining is more expensive and unique than a typical restaurant. They may have higher-quality décor, with establishments having certain rules of dining which visitors are generally expected to follow. They may have a dress code. The food is generally made of unique seasonal ingredients, often locally and sustainably sourced.

== History ==
The precursor to fine dining started around the 1780s when health-conscious bouillon shops evolved into grand "Parisian restaurants like Trois Frères and La Grande Taverne de Londres". The first fine dining restaurants in the United States operated in New York City, such as Delmonico's. The restaurant contained a 1,000-bottle wine cellar and remains in the same location.

In France, César Ritz, a Swiss developer, partnered with Auguste Escoffier at the Grand Hotel of Monte Carlo. This became the first restaurant to offer "luxury accommodations and gourmet dining all under one roof". In France, fine dining became yet another way of aping the aristocracy.

== Experience ==
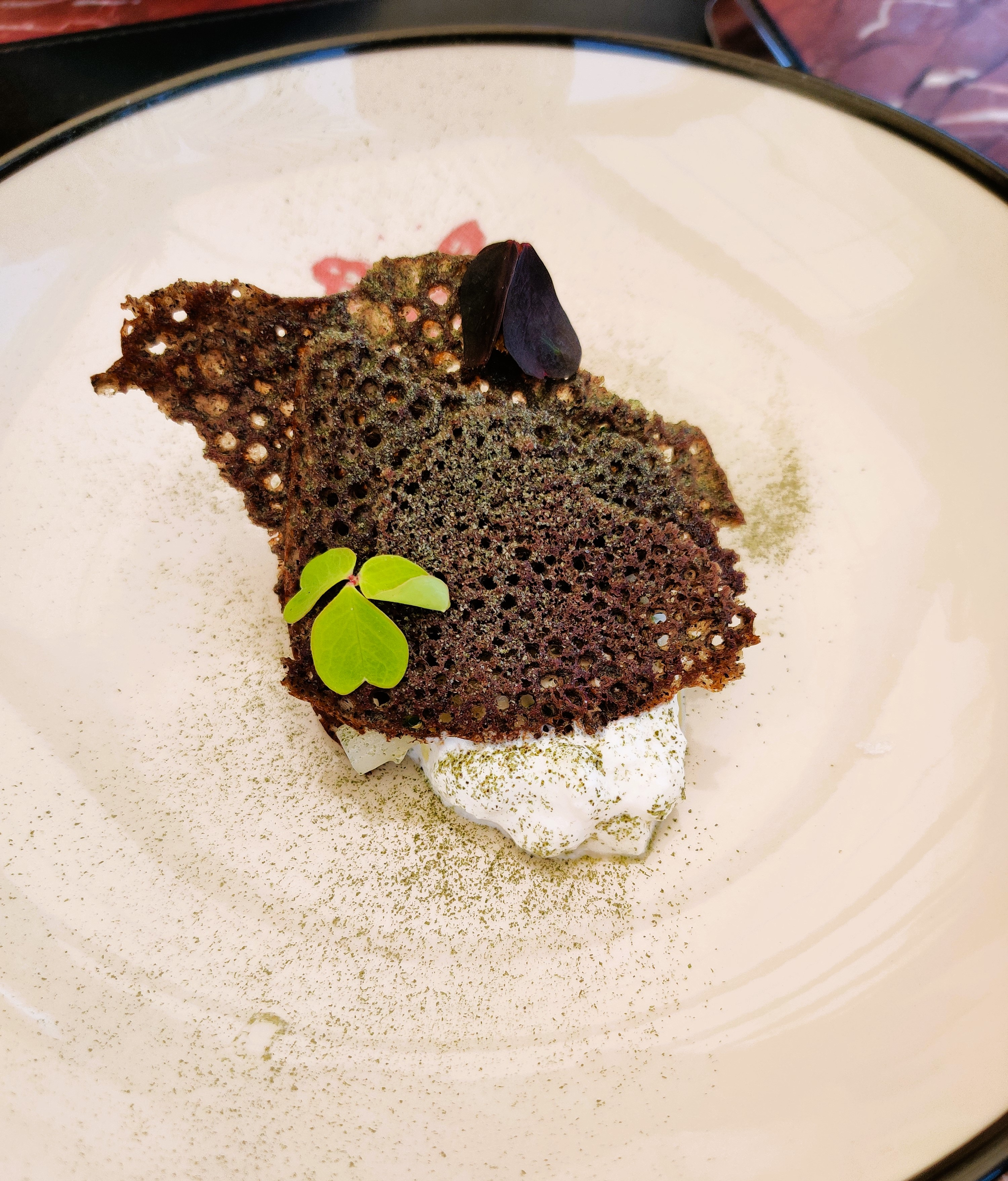
A Michelin star dish from Los Angeles, California

A fine dining restaurant's fare is expected be of higher quality compared to other restaurants. The dishware and cutlery used are also generally higher quality.

Menus at fine dining restaurants are often curated to have classic dishes with modern twists. A typical fine dining menu features multiple courses, which may include an amuse‑bouche, appetizer, main course, and dessert, each plated intricately in distinctive ways.

As fine dining prioritizes experience as much as food, a sommelier or dedicated wine bar is often provided to enhance the experience by recommending wine pairings for each course. Many fine dining restaurants also use soft lighting, sophisticated furnishings, and refined décor to create an elegant ambiance.

The establishments may have certain rules of dining which visitors are generally expected to follow, like a dress code.

== Occasions ==
As food is often a way to treat oneself or show appreciation to others, fine dining restaurants are commonly booked for special occasions such as anniversaries, birthdays, or milestone celebrations, when guests seek an elevated dining experience that reflects the importance of the moment.

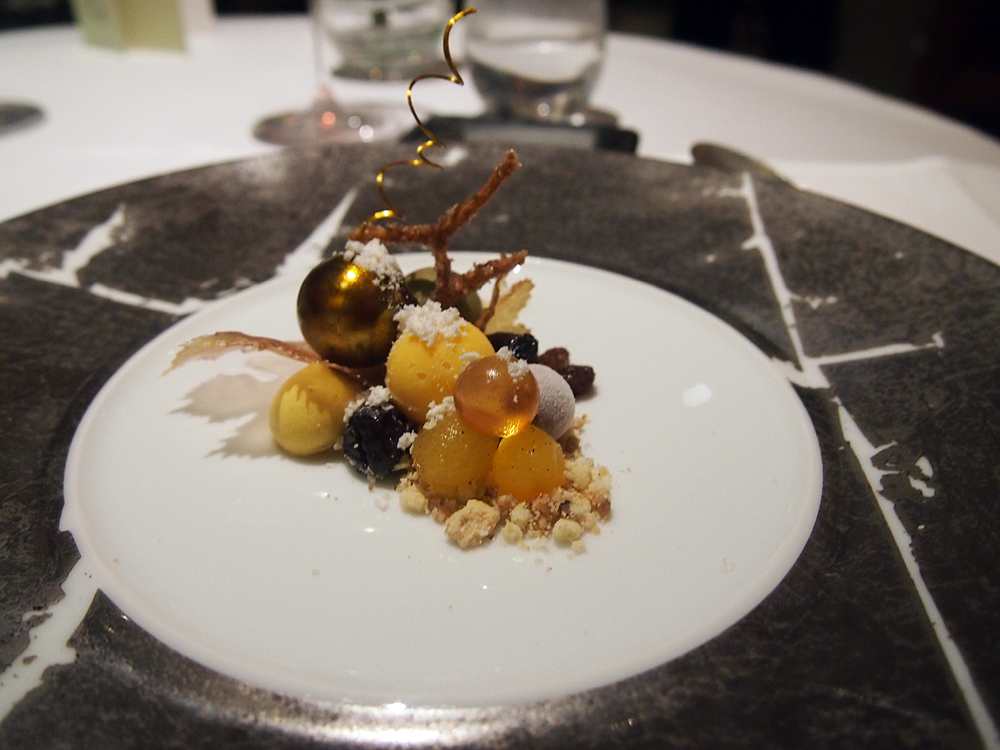
A fine dining meal

== Other names ==
Fine dining restaurants are some times called haute cuisine, a French term meaning 'high cooking', referring to the art of preparing food in a way that emphasizes quality, expertise and attention to detail. It is often associated with chefs from high-end restaurants who have skill and are innovative.

The establishments are sometimes called white-tablecloth restaurants, because they traditionally featured table service by servers, at tables covered by white tablecloths. The tablecloths were to symbolize the experience. The use of white tablecloths eventually became less fashionable, but the service and upscale ambiance remained.

== See also ==
- Types of restaurants
