= Paul Ferrier =

French dramatist

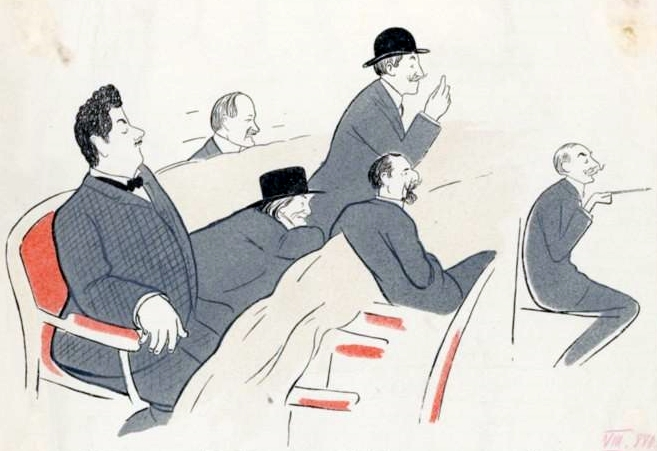
A rehearsal at the Opéra-Comique in 1880; In the back: Paul Ferrier. In the foreground from left to right: Giacomo Puccini, Victorien Sardou, Albert Carré, Tito Ricordi, André Messager.

Paul Ferrier (29 March 1843 – September 1920) was a French dramatist, who also provided libretti for several composers, especially Varney and Serpette.

Ferrier was born in Montpellier. He had already produced several comedies when in 1873 he secured real success with two short pieces, Chez l'avocat and Les Incendies de Massoulard. Others of his numerous plays are Les Compensations (1876); L'Art de tramper les femmes (1890), with Émile de Najac.

One of Ferrier's biggest successes was the production with Fabrice Carré of Josephine vendue par ses sœurs (1886), an opera bouffée with music by Victor Roger. His opera libretti include La Marocaine (1879), music of Jacques Offenbach; Le Chevalier d'Harmental (1896) after the play of Alexandre Dumas, père, for the music of André Messager; La Fille de Tabarin (1901), with Victorien Sardou, music of Gabriel Pierné.

Ferrier died in Nouan-le-Fuzelier (Loir-et-Cher), at age 77.

== Artistic works ==
=== Plays ===
- Chez l'avocat, 1873.
- Les incendies de Massoulard, 1873.
- Les compensations, 1876.
- La briguedondaine, 1877
- L'art de tramper les femmes, with Emile de Najac, 1890.

=== Operas ===
- Josephine vendue par ses sœurs, with Fabrice Carré, music by Victor Roger, 1886.
- La Marocaine, music by Jacques Offenbach, 1879.
- Le chevalier d'Harmental, 1896, music by André Messager, after the play of Alexandre Dumas, père.
- La fille de Tabarin, 1901, music by Gabriel Pierné.
- La vie mondaine (with Émile de Najac), opéra bouffe, premiere 13 February 1885, Paris, Nouveautés. Music by Charles Lecocq .
- Miousic, opérette, premiere 22 March 1914, Paris, Olympia. Music by Reynaldo Hahn, Charles Lecocq and André Messager.
