= Louis Baron, son =

French actor and singer

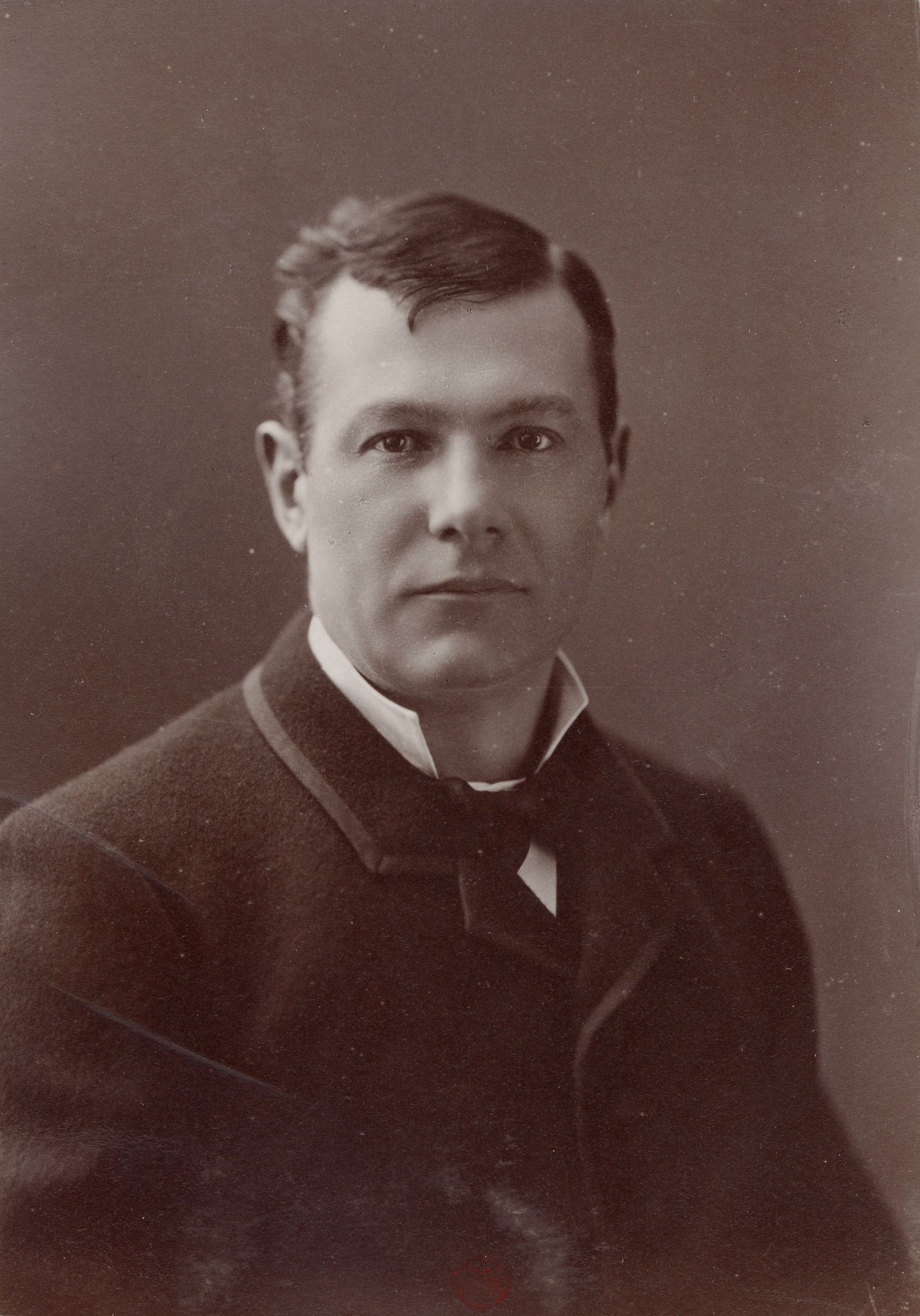

Louis Bouchêne, known as Louis Baron, fils (24 December 1870 in Paris – 30 November 1939 in Dieppe), was an actor and singer, who took part in many operettas and comédie-musicales, and was in 30 films between 1929 et 1938. He was the son of Louis Baron often associated with the works of Offenbach.

Baron began studies at the Conservatoire in 1890 in the class of Got, winning a first prize for comedy in 1893, and being engaged at the Théâtre de l'Odéon, making his debut that year in Les Plaideurs. In 1894 he appeared in Fleur de Vertu at the Théâtre des Bouffes-Parisiens and the following year several plays at the Théâtre des Folies-Dramatiques. His career continued over the next years at other Parisian theatres.

Appearing in operettas before the First World War, including François les bas-bleus in 1896, he also performed in comedies at the Théâtre du Vaudeville.

Baron was mobilised from 1914 to 1916, and appeared in the premieres of the following stage works: Dédé (1921, Leroydet), J'adore ça (1925, Monseigneur Spaghetto), Le Temps d'aimer (1926) and Il est charmant (1932, Poitou). He also appeared in the 1935 film Dédé.

His films included La femme invisible (1933), Cordon Bleu (1933) and Mademoiselle Mozart (1935).

== Selected filmography ==
- The Maid at the Palace (1927)
- Croquette (1927)
- The Mystery of the Villa Rose (1930)
- Our Masters, the Servants (1930)
- The Man in Evening Clothes (1931)
- Black and White (1931)
- Caught in the Act (1931)
- The Champion Cook (1932)
- Passionately (1932)
- The Crime of Bouif (1933)
- The Invisible Woman (1933)
- Your Smile (1934)
- Dédé (1935)
- You Are Me (1936)
- Let's Make a Dream (1936)
- Southern Mail (1937)
- The Two Schemers (1938)
