= Bouillon (restaurant) =

French traditional type of restaurant

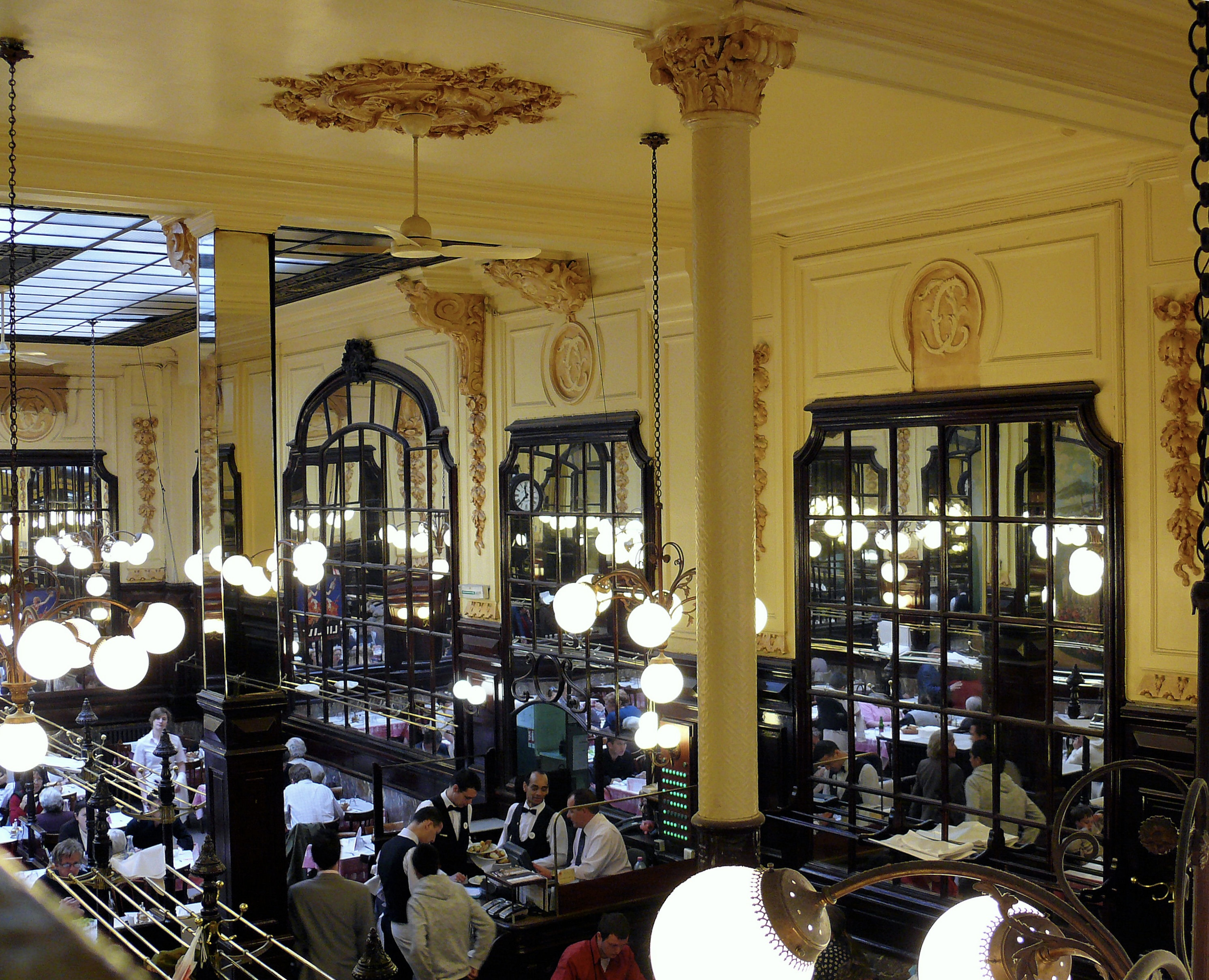
Dining room of Restaurant Chartier

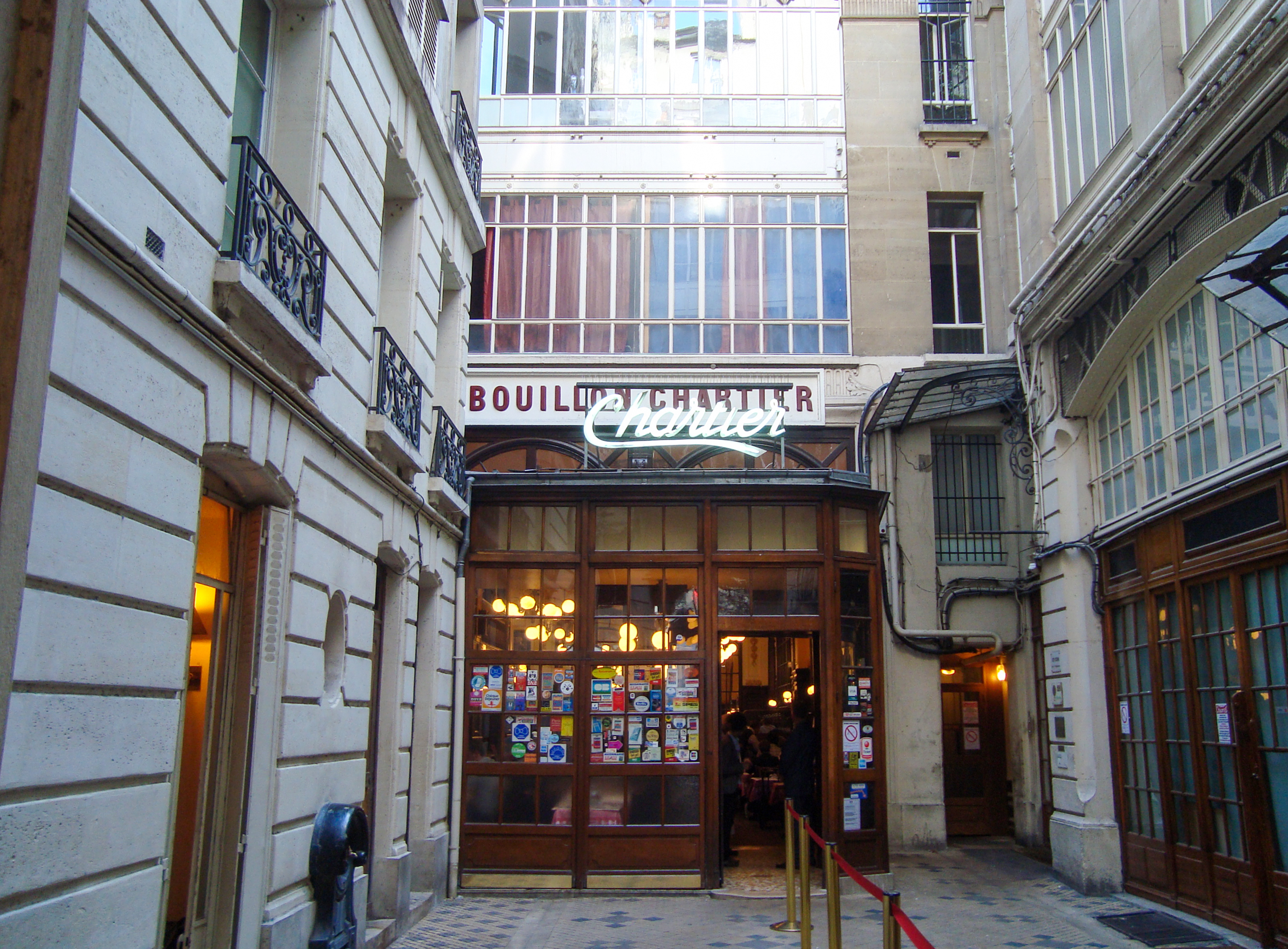
Entrance of Restaurant Chartier

In France, a bouillon (French pronunciation: [bujɔ̃]) is a traditional (late 19th or early 20th-century), spacious restaurant that usually serves traditional French cuisine, in particular a bouillon, which provides the name for this class of restaurants.

When invented, the concept was to serve good quality food quickly at an affordable price. By repeating the same formula across multiple sites, the founder also effectively invented the chain restaurant; however, this had no influence (beyond other bouillons), and ultimately it was American restaurant chains that revived the concept in France.

Today the buildings of some bouillons are listed historical monuments.

== History ==
In 1838 a Dutch company began to sell bouillon in uniform outlets. These first "Bouillons Hollandais" did not survive, but in 1854 a French butcher, Adolphe-Baptiste Duval (1811-1870), revived the idea (and is typically erroneously credited with originating it).

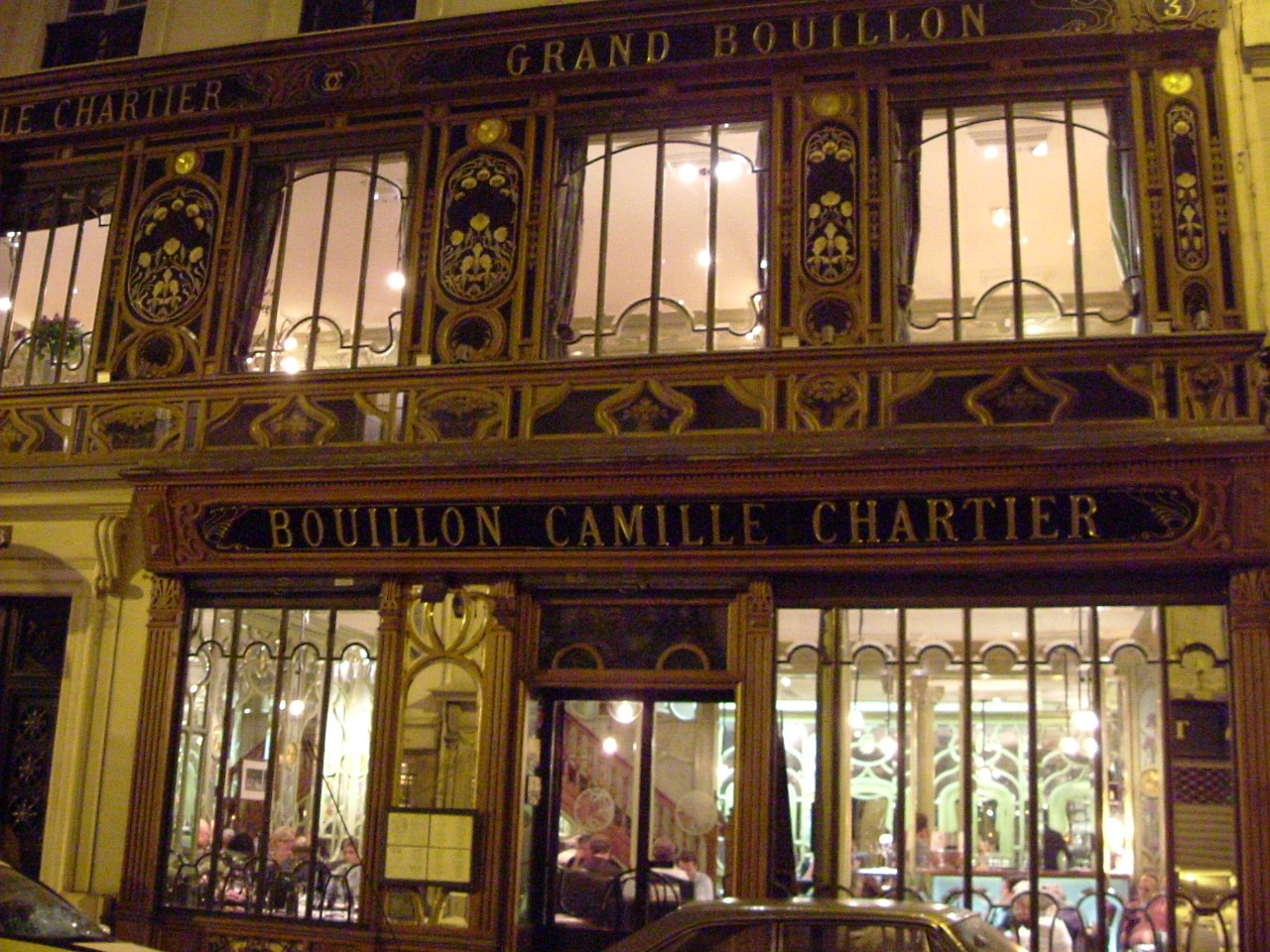
Front of Bouillon Racine

Nowadays only a few authentic bouillons remain, such as in Faubourg-Montmartre and in particular the one on Rue Racine, which has the most baroque style of Art Nouveau.

Since 2017 the Parisian bouillon has seen a resurgence. Bouillon Chartier Montparnasse, which had been lately functioning as a brasserie named Montparnasse 1900, reprised its original vocation (and name) in 2019. Two new bouillons have been launched by the Moussié brothers Pierre and Guillaume: Bouillon Pigalle (opened in 2017 on Boulevard Clichy) and Bouillon République (opened in 2021 in the former home of the venerable brasserie, Chez Jenny).

== Popular culture ==
- The novel A Killer at Sorbonne (French: Un tueur en Sorbonne) by René Reouven was inspired by the characters and customers at Bouillon Racine. In this context, the novelist recalls the assassination of Symon Petliura by Sholom Schwartzbard in 1926, which took place at the exit of Bouillon Camille Chartier (i.e. Bouillon Racine).
- In 1939 Fernandel sang of Chez Chartier in the song "Félicie aussi" by Albert Willemetz:

Afin d'séduire la petite chatte. Je l'emmenai dîner chez Chartier
Comme elle est fine et délicate. Elle prit un pied d'cochon grillé
(English: To seduce the little pussy-cat, I took her out to dine at Chartier's
As she is fine and considerate, she chose a roast pig's trotter)

- In the novel Les Beaux Quartiers by Louis Aragon, Chez Chartier is mentioned as the restaurant where young Edmond Barbentane lunches regularly.
- The setting of the closing scene in Mathieu Amalric's telefilm La Chose publique is at Chez Chartier.

== See also ==
- Chez Chartier

== Videos ==
- Chartier restaurant Paris (French)

== Books ==
- Matthieu Flory/Clémentine Forissier: Restaurants, brasseries et bistrots parisiens. Editions Ereme, Paris 2007, pp. 82–85, ISBN 9782915337471
- Jean Colson/Marie-Christine Lauroa (Eds.): Dictionnaire des monuments de Paris. Editions Hervas, Paris 2003, ISBN 2-84334-001-2
