= Félicie aussi =

Single by Fernandel
- Released: 1939
- Genre: chanson
- Composer: Casimir Oberfeld
- Lyricists: Albert Willemetz, Charles-Louis Pothier

Music video
- "Félicie aussi" (French TV, 1968) on YouTube

"Félicie aussi" is a 1939 song performed by Fernandel. Of the 300 songs he sang on stage during his career, it is undoubtedly his most famous.

== Writing and composition ==
The song was written by Albert Willemetz (who penned the lyrics for such songs as Maurice Chevalier's "Valentine" and Mistinguett's "C'est vrai") and Charles-Louis Pothier and composed by Casimir Oberfeld.

The song is based on appreciation of the adverb "aussi" ("too"):

Il faisait un temps superbe
Je me suis assis sur l'herbe
Félicie aussi
J'pensais les arbres bourgeonnent
Et les gueules-de-loup boutonnent
Félicie aussi

The weather was superb
I sat on the grass
So did Félicie
I thought, Trees are budding

And snapdragons are budding
So is Félicie

== Charts ==
Chart (2012)	Peak position
France (SNEP)	114
