= Black and White (1931 film) =

1931 film

- Directed by: Marc Allégret; Robert Florey
- Written by: Sacha Guitry
- Based on: Black and White by Sacha Guitry
- Produced by: Maurice Tourneur
- Starring: Raimu; André Alerme; Louis Baron fils
- Cinematography: Theodor Sparkuhl
- Edited by: Jean Mamy; Denise Batcheff
- Music by: Philippe Parès; Georges Van Parys
- Production company: Les Établissements Braunberger-Richebé
- Distributed by: Cinélux
- Release date: 21 May 1931
- Running time: 106 minutes
- Country: France
- Language: French

Black and White (French: Le blanc et le noir) is a 1931 French comedy film directed by Marc Allégret and Robert Florey and starring Raimu, André Alerme and Louis Baron fils. Described as a "feeble racist comedy" it was the feature screen debut to the comedian Fernandel. It is an adaptation of the 1922 play of the same title by Sacha Guitry, who wrote the screenplay.

It was shot at the Billancourt Studios in Paris. Marc Allégret also worked as art director, designing the film's sets.

== Cast ==
- Raimu as Marcel Desnoyers
- André Alerme as George Samoy
- Louis Baron fils as H. Massicourt - Le père de Marguerite'
- Charles Lamy as Le docteur Leclerc
- Louis Kerly as Arthur
- Fernandel as Le groom vierge
- Paul Pauley as M. Timiriou - le chef de bureau
- Suzanne Dantès as Marguerite Desnoyers
- Irène Wells as Peggy Samoy
- Charlotte Clasis as Mme Massicaut
- Pauline Carton as Marie - la bonne
- Monette Dinay as Joséphine
- Les Jackson Girls as Elles-mêmes - dans leur numéro

== Bibliography ==
- Crisp, Colin. French Cinema—A Critical Filmography: Volume 1, 1929–1939. Indiana University Press, 2015.
