= Opéra Éclaté =

Opéra Éclaté is a small-scale opera company based in Colomiers, Midi-Pyrénées, France.

It was founded in 1985 by Oliver Desbordes, who remains its director, while also undertaking stage direction of many productions. In 1998-99, Opéra Éclaté was recognised by the Ministère de la Culture as a ‘Compagnie nationale de Théâtre Lyrique et Musical’.

Opéra Éclaté performs in a wide range of venues and aims particularly to engage in outreach toward those who do not normally go to opera.

Each winter 2-3 small-scale original productions are toured in the Midi-Pyrénées region and beyond within France. Over 20 years, 50 productions have been seen in 200 French towns, by 500,000 spectators. There have also been tours to Spain, Switzerland, Slovenia, Tunisia and Morocco.

The 2009 season will be revivals of Le roi Carotte and Berlin Années 20 with La flûte enchantée.

Opera productions have included:

- Le roi Carotte
- Un Barbier de Séville (after Rossini with recitatives replaced by dialogue by Beaumarchais)
- La traviata
- La flûte enchantée
- Carmen
- Dédé
- Les Contes d'Hoffmann
- Bastien et Bastienne

Music-based spectacles have included:

- Madame Raymonde Revient!
- Tangos
- Berlin Années 20 (Es liegt in der Luft)
- Dubas de haut, en bas (about Marie Dubas, ‘l’Enfant Terrible of the Music-Hall’)
- Schubert/ Cavanna (by Bernard Cavanna)
- Les Eléments Méditerranée (included two world premieres: Trois fragments des Bacchantes by Alexandros Markeas and Cette parole by Zad Moultaka)
