= Ça sent si bon la France =

Single by Maurice Chevalier
- Language: French
- English title: France smells so good
- Recorded: 18 November 1941
- Genre: Waltz
- Length: 2:55
- Composer(s): Louiguy
- Lyricist(s): Jacques Larue

Track listing
- 1. La Chanson du maçon 2. Ça sent si bon la France

"Ça sent si bon la France" is a song performed by Maurice Chevalier in 1941.

== Development and composition ==
The song was written by Jacques Larue and composed by Louiguy.

In 1994, Les 3 Julots recorded the song for the album Les Chansons de la Libération where they also recorded La Fête à Neu-Neu, Fleur de Paris, Notre Espoir and La Marche de Ménilmontant.

== Track List ==
The song is part of Gramophone K-8546 (The French Gramophone Company His Master's Voice), a 78 rpm recorded on 18 November 1941 with orchestration by Marcel Cariven.

1. La Chanson du maçon (Song of the mason) - music by Heri Betti and lyrics by Maurice Chevalier and Maurice Vandair
2. Ça sent si bon la France (France smells so good)
