= Dédé (opérette) =

Dédé is an opérette or musical comedy in three acts with music by Henri Christiné and a French libretto by Albert Willemetz. It marked an important milestone in developing the career of Maurice Chevalier.

== Performance history ==
Dédé opened at the Théâtre des Bouffes Parisiens, Paris on 10 November 1921, almost exactly three years after Christiné's hit Phi-Phi, and although Dédé did not manage that long a run, this was mainly due to a change of theatre (there were nearly 400 performances at the Bouffes, and 60 more at the Scala in Paris. Its London run was at the Garrick Theatre from 17 October 1922 (50 performances), with Joseph Coyne in the lead role.

Revivals took place at the Théâtre Marigny in 1942, again in Paris in 1973 and in Lyon in 1993. In recent years it has been produced in Brussels, Cannes, Marseille, Metz, Reims (broadcast on France 3), and on tour by Opéra Éclaté.

A film adaptation of the piece was released in 1935, starring Albert Préjean and Danielle Darrieux. A complete sound recording was made in 1953, with Chevalier in his original role, and another from Decca/RCA in 1973, complete with dialogue.

According to Roger Nichols, "the mood throughout is one of civilized charm and gaiety, as one can tell from the titles of the songs", citing 'Elle porte un nom charmant' ('She has a charming name'), 'Dans la vie faut pas s'en faire' ('In life one mustn't take things to heart'), and 'Tous les chemins mènent à l'amour ('All roads lead to love').

== Roles ==
Role	Voice type	Premiere Cast, 10 November 1921 (Conductor: -)
André de la Huchette ('Dédé')	baritone	André Urban
Robert Dauvergne	baritone	Maurice Chevalier
Maître Leroydet, a notary	-	Louis Baron, fils
Chausson	-	Hemdey
Le Commissaire	-	Géo Bury
Denise	soprano	Alice Cocéa
Odette	soprano	Maguy Warna
Une amie	-	Marthe Duguet
Lucette	-	Germaine Pommier

== Synopsis ==
Setting: A Parisian shoe shop Le pied meurtri (The Bruised Foot) in 1921

=== Act I ===
André de la Huchette (known as Dédé), is attempting to woo Odette, a beautiful woman he met at a dance. Monsieur Chausson, Odette's husband, has problems with his business, and Dédé has bought it as an ideal place to carry on a liaison with Odette, not aware that Monsieur Chausson is her husband. The sales girls are all dancers at the Casino de Paris in the evenings. Dédé tries to get Odette to tell him all about herself and she pretends to be the wife of the Préfet de Police. Denise overhears all this. Maître Leroydet comes to the shop every day pretending to be looking for comfortable shoes, but in fact courting Denise, the shop's head seamstress, who herself is in love with Dédé. Robert d’Auvergne, Dédé's friend, has lost his fortune gambling in Monte Carlo; when Dédé calls to see Odette he finds Robert and to help him out makes him manager of the shop.

=== Act II ===
Unaware that the Préfet is not married, Denise in her jealousy sends an anonymous letter to him, where she reveals his supposed wife's adultery. Meanwhile, the shoe workers union calls a strike, and a delegation comes to demand that Dédé close his shop, but the strikers are distracted by the sales girls. Odette finds herself alone with Dédé but sees her husband looking through the shop window and hides. With a crowd in the shop, the police inspector comes looking for the strikers. Dédé and his friends think that the Préfet himself has come looking for his wife. So to divert attention, Denise appears scantily dressed as Dédé's mistress. While Dédé and Robert hold the fort, Odette escapes from the shop; the police officer states who he is why he is there. Dédé now wonders who Odette really is.

=== Act III ===
Dédé realises that he will be happy with Denise and asks for her hand. As the shop is now no use to him, he presents it to Chausson. Robert turns his attentions to Odette. He convinces her, and when Odette learns of Dédé's generosity, she gets Chausson to keep Robert as manager.

== Musical numbers ==
- Overture

Act I :

- Chœur des vendeuses « Ah la drôle de boutique »
- Couplets « J’avais tout çà » (Leroydet)
- Couplets « Et voilà comme cet excellent jeune homme » (Denise)
- Chœur des vendeuses et entrée de Dédé » Voici des lis »
- Couplets « Dans la vie faut pas s’en faire » (Robert)
- Couplets « Elle porte un nom charmant » (Dédé)
- Duo » Tango, lorsque tu nous tiens » (Odette, Dédé)
- Finale I : « Pour bien réussir dans la chaussure » (Les vendeuses, Robert), « Quelle est cette poule », « C’est la femme du Préfet de Police »

Act II :

- Entr’acte
- Ensemble « Voici, Messieurs » (Robert, les vendeuses)
- Couplets « Je m’donne » (Robert)
- Duetto « Oh Madame, je vous trouve exquise » (Robert, Dédé)
- Duo « Si j’avais su évidemment » (Denise, Robert)
- Ensemble « Au nom de la Fédération » (les délégués syndicaux)
- Couplets « Le désir, déjà » (Odette)
- Finale II : Ensemble « Quelle drôle de boutique » (tous)

Act III :

- Chœur « Bonheur inattendu » (les vendeuses)
- Couplets » C’est un plaisir si grand » (Odette)
- Duo « J’ose pas » (Odette, Robert)
- Duo « Tous les chemins mènent à l’amour » (Denise, Dédé)
- Finale III (All)
