= Gaston Serpette =

French composer (1846–1904)

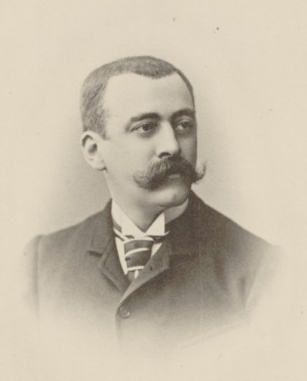
Gaston Serpette

Henri Charles Antoine Gaston Serpette (4 November 1846 – 3 November 1904) was a French composer, best known for his operettas. After winning the prestigious Prix de Rome as a student at the Paris Conservatoire, he was expected to pursue a career in serious music. Instead, he turned to operetta, writing more than twenty full-length pieces between 1874 and 1900. He accepted some conducting work and also served as a critic and journalist for a number of French newspapers and magazines.

== Early life and work ==
Serpette, the son of a rich industrialist, was born in Nantes, in western France. He qualified as a lawyer before deciding to devote himself to music. In 1868 he entered the composition class of Ambroise Thomas at the Paris Conservatoire, and in 1871 won France's top musical prize, the Prix de Rome, previously won by Berlioz, Thomas, Gounod, Bizet and Massenet, among others. Serpette's winning entry was Jeanne d'Arc, a cantata to a libretto by M. J. Barbier, which was performed at the Paris Opéra in November of the same year. However, to the distress of the conservative element at the Conservatoire, Serpette also submitted an operetta. When it was played on the piano to Gounod, Thomas and the members of the Académie des Beaux-Arts, the academy's secretary, Viscount Delaborde, declared that Serpette "had gone to the bad".

Finding himself unwelcome in serious musical circles, Serpette continued to compose operettas. In 1873 he wrote the three-act La branche cassée, to a libretto by Adolphe Jaime and Jules Noriac. The piece was well received at the Théâtre des Bouffes-Parisiens, in January 1874, and at the Opera Comique, London in an English version presented by Richard D'Oyly Carte in October of the same year. The critic of London's The Morning Post, noted that in the London version there were so many interpolations into Serpette's original score that "barely half the solos are from his pen". He added that the music "though not remarkable for originality, is above mediocrity, and ... far surpasses the usual run of opéra-bouffe music." Serpette followed this with more works in the same genre: Le manoir du Pic-Tordu (1875), Le moulin du vert-galant (1876) and La petite muette (1877), which, after its Paris première, became the first of Serpette's shows to be played in New York, where it opened at the Fifth Avenue Theatre but ran for only five performances. Serpette continued with a succession of shows that were successful in Paris, but not considered suitable for the public of London or New York. Of La petite muette, the London paper The Era reported most favourably on the music, but made it clear that the plot was too risqué for English tastes: "not even the most elaborate circumlocution would enable me to steer clear of offending the modesty of your fair readers were I to recite the incident on which the plot turns." A Serpette piece, Le carnet du diable, was reviewed in The Era in 1895 under the headline, "Indecency in Paris".

Serpette's works were continually in demand in Paris. Between 1874 and 1900, with librettists including such writers as Henri Meilhac and Georges Feydeau, he wrote more than twenty full-length operettas, and at least nine shorter ones. Nevertheless, in the view of the English critic Andrew Lamb, "Serpette was destined to continue, along with Varney, Vasseur, Roger and Lacome, in the shadow of such French operetta composers as Planquette, Audran and, later, Messager."

== Later years ==
In late 1892, in the press of London and Paris, Serpette engaged in a lively debate with the English composer Edward Solomon. The latter protested about what he called the "botching" of French operetta scores when adapted for the English stage. Serpette took the pragmatic view that the French and English publics were so different that Parisian operettas had to be drastically rewritten to succeed in London, and he offered his fellow French composers three choices: "they must either refuse to permit their works to be adapted" (in which case no London producer would touch them), or "master the English language, and do it themselves which they never will", or settle for being adapted by those who knew what the West End public required.

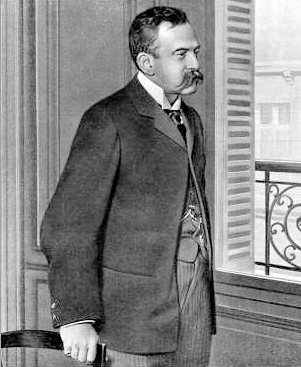
Serpette: a 1904 press photograph

This was not Serpette's only incursion into print. He was music critic for a number of Paris newspapers and journals. He reviewed music for Gil Blas magazine (his review of Debussy's Pelléas et Mélisande appeared simultaneously with reviews by Paul Dukas and Vincent D'Indy for the Gazette de Beaux-Arts and L'Occident, respectively) and wrote the musical column of the Paris newspaper, in which his disagreement with Solomon was published. Serpette also worked as a conductor. One of his appointments was in London, conducting the ballets at the re-opening of Carte's former Royal English Opera House when it was relaunched as the Palace Theatre of Varieties in 1892, and throughout the ensuing season.

Towards the end of his career, Serpette had more of his works performed in England. Augustus Harris and F. C. Burnand adapted La demoiselle du téléphone as The Telephone Girl in 1896; it toured the country for three years. Serpette, in line with his earlier comments on adaptations, agreed to the addition of new musical items by J. M. Glover. His last show, written in 1903, originally entitled Cuvée reservée 1810, was specially composed for England, and, under the title Amorelle, toured the provinces in 1903–04 before opening at the Comedy Theatre in London in February 1904.

Serpette was made a Chevalier of the Legion of Honour in 1898. For some time he left Paris to live in Algeria, where he had purchased vineyards. During one of his sea trips between Algiers and Marseille, he was knocked down by a freak wave, breaking his leg; he walked with a limp for the rest of his life.

He died in 1904, on the eve of his 58th birthday, and his funeral at the Église de la Sainte-Trinité was attended by "le Tout-Paris". He was subsequently buried in the family tomb in the cemetery of Sainte-Marie-sur-Mer on 7 November 1904.

== Works ==
Opéras-bouffes and operettas

- La Branche cassée, opéra-bouffe in 3 acts, libretto by Adolphe Jaime and Jules Noriac, Bouffes-Parisiens, 1874
- Le Manoir de Pic-Tordu, operetta in 3 acts, libretto by Saint-Albin and Arnold Mortier, Variétés, 1875
- Le Moulin du Vert-Galant, operetta in 3 acts, libretto by Eugène Grangé and V. Bernard, Bouffes-Parisiens, 1876
- La Petite Muette, operetta in 3 acts, libretto by Paul Ferrier, Bouffes-Parisiens, 1877
- Rothomago, operetta in 4 acts, 1880, Alhambra Theatre (London)
- La Nuit de Saint-Germain, operetta in 3 acts, libretto by G. Hirsch, Fantaisies-Parisiennes (Brussels) 1880,
- Madame le Diable ou Madame Satan, operetta in 4 acts, libretto by Henri Meilhac, Arnold Mortier and Albert Millaud, Théâtre de la Renaissance, 1882
- La Princesse, operetta in 1 act, libretto by Raoul Toché, Variétés, 1882
- Steeplechase, operetta in 1 act, libretto by Paul Decourcelle, Londres, 1883
- Tige de Lotus, operetta in 1 act, libretto by Raoul Toché, Casino de Contrexéville, 1883
- Franfreluche, operetta in 1 act, libretto by G. Hirsch, Saint-Artoman, Paul Burani, Renaissance, 1883
- Madame Réséda, operetta in 1 act, libretto by Jules Prével, Renaissance, 1884
- Le Château de Tire-Larigot, operetta in 3 acts, libretto by 'Ernest Blum and Raoul Toché, Théâtre des Nouveautés, 1884
- Le Petit Chaperon rouge, operetta in 3 acts, libretto by Ernest Blum and Raoul Toché, Nouveautés, 1885
- Le Singe d'une nuit d'été, operetta in 1 act, libretto by Édouard Noël, Bouffes-Parisiens, 1886
- Adam et Eve, operetta in 3 acts, libretto by Ernest Blum and Raoul Toché, Nouveautés, 1886
- La Gamine de Paris, operetta in 3 acts, libretto by Eugène Letterier and Albert Vanloo, Bouffes-Parisiens, 1887
- La Lycéenne, operetta in 3 acts, libretto by Georges Feydeau, 1887
- Cendrillonnette, operetta in 4 acts in collaboration with Victor Roger, libretto by Paul Ferrier, Bouffes-Parisiens, 1890
- La Demoiselle du téléphone, operetta in 3 acts, libretto by Maurice Desvallières and Antony Mars, Nouveautés, 1891
- Mé-ne-ka, operetta in 1 act, libretto by Paul Ferrier, Nouveautés, 1892
- La Bonne de chez Duval, operetta in 3 acts, libretto by H. Raymond and Antony Mars, 1892
- Cousin-Cousine, operetta in 3 acts, libretto by Maurice Ordonneau and H. Kéroul, Folies-Dramatiques, 1893
- La Tourte, operetta in 1 act, libretto by Paul Bilhaud, Asnières, 1895
- La Dot de Brigitte, operetta in 1 act in collaboration with Victor Roger, libretto by Paul Ferrier, Bouffes-Parisiens, 1895
- Le Carnet du diable, operetta in 3 acts, libretto by Paul Ferrier and Ernest Blum, Variétés, 1895
- Le Capitole, operetta in 3 acts, libretto by Paul Ferrierand Charles Clairville, Nouveautés, 1895
- Le Royaume des femmes, operetta in 3 acts, libretto by Paul Ferrier and Ernest Blum, 1896
- Le Carillon, operetta in 4 acts, libretto by Paul Ferrier and Ernest Blum, Variétés, 1896
- Shakespeare, operetta in 3 acts, libretto by Paul Gavault and Robert de Flers, Bouffes-Parisiens, 1899
- Frileuse ou l'Enfant du cocktail (non-représenté)
- Cuvée réservée 1810 (Amorelle 1810), libretto by Barton White and Ernest Boyd-Jones, Kennington (Londres), 1903

Vocal music (melodies, etc.)

- La Bouquetière, lyrics by Gaston Serpette, 1877
- La Mort des amants, text by Charles Baudelaire, 1879

== Bibliography ==
- Frédéric Robert, "Gaston Serpette" in Dictionnaire de la musique en France au XIXe siècle (Joël-Marie Fauquet, dir.), Fayard, Paris, 2003 (ISBN 978-2-213-59316-6)
- Jacques-Gabriel Prod'homme, "Les Musiciens français à Rome (1803–1903)" in Sammelbände der Internationalen Musikgesellschaft, août 1903, Breitkopf & Härtel, (p. 728–737)
