= Our Masters, the Servants =

1930 film

- Directed by: Hewitt Claypoole Grantham-Hayes
- Written by: Henri Falk
- Produced by: Jacques Haïk
- Starring: Louis Baron fils; Henri Garat; René Ferté
- Production company: Les Établissements Jacques Haïk
- Distributed by: Les Établissements Jacques Haïk
- Release date: November 1930
- Running time: 90 minutes
- Country: France
- Language: French

Our Masters, the Servants (French: Nos maîtres les domestiques) is a 1930 French comedy film directed by Hewitt Claypoole Grantham-Hayes and starring Louis Baron fils, Henri Garat and René Ferté. It was made at Twickenham Studios in England due to delays in equipping French studios for sound.

== Cast ==
- Louis Baron fils as Joseph
- Henri Garat as Maruis Richard d'Argental
- René Ferté as Henri Duplessis
- Georges Tréville as Col. de montausset-Brissac
- Jacques Henley as Inspector Lerand
- Diana as Sylvie Mareuil
- Madeleine Guitty as Augustine
- Michèle Verly as Evangéline Lovejoy
- Ginette Gaubert as Hélène Grandcourt
- Renée Parme as Louise
- Simone Mareuil

== Bibliography ==
- Bessy, Maurice & Chirat, Raymond. Histoire du cinéma français: 1929-1934. Pygmalion, 1988.
