= Valentine (Maurice Chevalier song) =

Single by Maurice Chevalier
- Released: 1925
- Genre: Chanson
- Composer: Henri Christiné
- Lyricist: Albert Willemetz
- Producer: Renn Productions

Music video
- "Valentine" (audio) "Valentine" Folies Bergère de Paris (video) on YouTube

"Valentine" is a song originally performed by French actor, cabaret singer and entertainer Maurice Chevalier. Its first public performance was in 1925. The song was strongly associated with him, and his imitators use it as "an instant identification symbol". Chevalier performed the song, in French, in two American movies, Innocents of Paris (1928) and Folies Bergère de Paris (1935), but to not offend American sensibilities the word tétons ('breasts') was replaced with a mysterious piton, which translates as 'peg' or 'protuberance'. Piton was needed for the rhyme scheme, but Chevalier always pointed to his nose at that moment in the song, to indicate what part of his lover's anatomy he was supposedly fondling.

== History ==
In 1924, Maurice Chevalier was no longer a stranger to the public eye. His passionate love affair with the French songstress Mistinguett and "Dans la vie faut pas s'en faire" ("You mustn't worry so much in your life"), a song that became his first hit the following year, had brought him a certain notoriety. He felt he was at the dawn of a great career. Shortly after meeting his future wife Yvonne Vallée, he signed a three-year contract with Léon Volterra to take part in three revues at the Casino de Paris.

On November 28, 1925, Chevalier premiered a new revue titled Paris en fleurs, in which he co-starred with Yvonne Vallée. The public hurried en masse to witness their love. Chevalier sang "Valentine", a song with somewhat risque lyrics – "imbued with café-concert spirit" – for the first time in this revue. Many artists and observers consider that only Chevalier could sing this song while maintaining a certain properness of manner. For example, Yves Montand has noted: [...] and the charm of Maurice Chevalier arriving on stage [...] he had extraordinary looks and class [...] "Maurice often took songs that were trendy and that he imposed with his authentic geniality: one had to be a genius to impose "Valentine"!"

The public went to the Casino de Paris regularly just to hear this song. According to Dave DiMartino in his book Music in the 20th Century, Chevalier's "rendition of lighthearted songs such as 'Valentine' [...] seemed to conjure up the romantic feel of Paris".

== Composition ==
Albert Willemetz and Henri Christiné wrote "Valentine" for Chevalier. The song starts off saying that you always remember your first lover. In the singer's case, her name was Valentine. In the chorus the singer describes her as having small feet, little breasts ("Elle avait des tout petits tétons") and a little chin. She also was "curly like a sheep". The song goes on to add (in translation) "She wasn’t the brightest/But in bed, that’s not important."

The singer runs into her in the street many years later. He sees a woman who is as fat as a hippopotamus, has a double chin and "triple breasts". She runs up to him with an affectionate shout and throws her arms around his neck. He does not recognize her at all and asks "Excuse me, but who are you?" And she replies that she is Valentine. The last lines, sung ruefully, translate as "Oh poor little Valentine, that should not be allowed...not be allowed, no."

== Later versions and performances ==
Chevalier performed the song in his first American movie, Innocents of Paris (1928), a musical comedy directed by Richard Wallace and starring Sylvia Beecher. He sang it again in the 1935 movie Folies Bergère de Paris (both in the American version directed by Roy Del Ruth and the French version directed by Marcel Achard (Note: In fact, director of the French version "Marcel Achard did nothing more than supervise and adapt the French version from the film shot in the United States by Roy del Ruth [...]" (Claude Bouniq-Mercier). Source: Jean Tulard, Guide des films F–O, 2002, Éditions Bouquins Robert Laffont, p. 1445.)). In order not to shock the American public, the original lyrics:

She had very small breasts
That I groped

were modified as

She had a very small piton ("a very small peg")
That I groped.

When Chevalier sang the word piton, he pointed his finger at his nose to indicate what the piton was.

The American version opens with the famous song "Valentine", interpreted by Maurice Chevalier in French. But the "small breasts" (tétons) have been modestly replaced with a mysterious little piton (sic!), whose nature Maurice Chevalier suggests by touching his nose. The American spectators interested in learning French would have to remain greatly puzzled!

— Jean-Pierre Coursodon, Bertrand Tavernier — 50 Years of American Cinema
