= Henri Christiné =

French composer and conductor

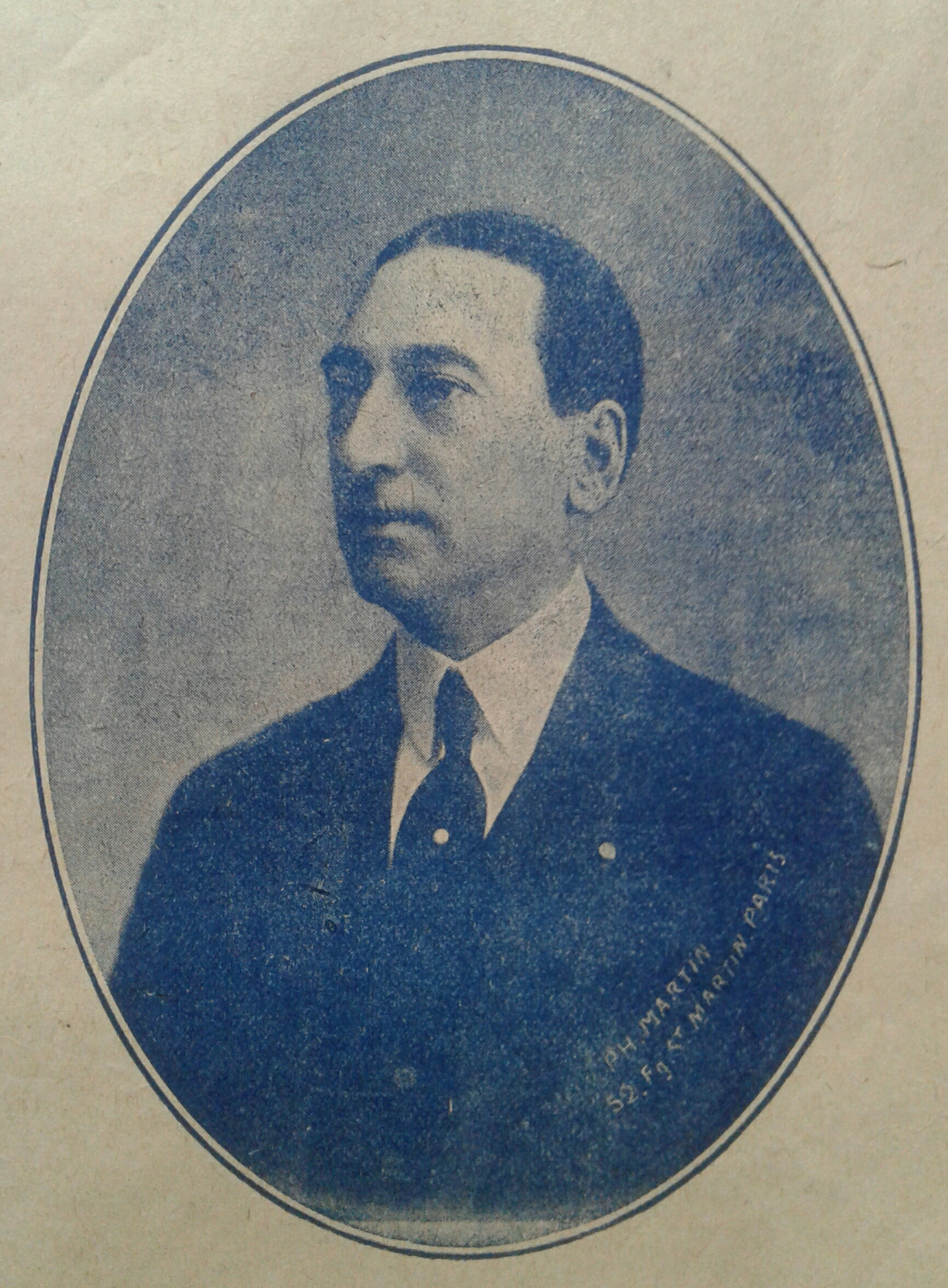
Henri Christiné, 1917

Henri Marius Christiné (27 December 1867 – 25 November 1941) was a French composer of Swiss birth.

The son of a French Savoyard watchmaker, Christiné was born in Geneva, Switzerland. He began by teaching at the lycée in Geneva, while pursuing his interest in music and playing organ in a local church. He married a cafe singer whose troupe was passing through Geneva, and went with her to Nice where they were married. He made his home in France, writing songs firstly for his wife and then for popular singers such as Mayol, Dranem, and Fragson. He also conducted for the music hall at the Place Clichy.

Although Christiné wrote some operettas for the Scala theatre in Paris before the First World War, his career took off when he had his operetta Phi-Phi staged the day of the Armistice on 11 November 1918, with words by Albert Willemetz and Fabien Solar and which ran for three years at the Bouffes-Parisiens. This success was followed by Dédé in 1921, Madame (1923) and J'adore ça (1925). These works were in the forefront of a new fashion in music-theatre: sparkling, witty, jazzy musical plays. Christiné's tunes often build on repeated refrains of six or seven notes (a 'hook') which made them catchy and popular for contemporary audiences.

In the 1930s Christiné contributed to the renewed fashion for more large-scale spectacular musicals, with pieces for the Théâtre du Châtelet in Paris, Au temps des Merveilleuses and Yana; for these he wrote the more vibrant numbers, while Richepin did the romantic songs. "Le Bonheur, Mesdames" and "Le Flirt ambulant" were rearrangements of his songs from the 1900s. He died in Nice, France.

Phi-Phi and Dédé are still occasionally revived in France.

== Works ==
- 1903 : Service d'amour, Brussels
- 1904 : Mam'zelle Chichi, Paris
- 1907 : Les Vierges du harem, Brussels
- 1908 : Cinq minutes d'amour, Paris
- 1918 : Phi-Phi, Paris
- 1921 : Dédé, Paris
- 1923 : Madame, Paris
- 1925 : J'adore ça; PLM, Paris
- 1926 : J'aime !, Paris
- 1929 : Arthur, Paris
- 1931 : Encore cinquante centimes (with Maurice Yvain), Paris
- 1933 : La Madone du promenoir; L'Affaire Brocs, Paris
- 1934 : Le Bonheur, mesdames !; Au temps des Merveilleuses (with Tiarko Richepin)
- 1934 : La Poule; Yana (with Tiarko Richepin)

=== Songs ===
- "Le beau gosse"
- "Jamais en colère"
- "A la Martinique"
- "Le long du Missouri"
- "La Baya"
- "La petite dame du Métro"
- "Dans la vie faut pas s'en faire"
- "Oh ! Maurice"
- "Je sais que vous êtes jolie"
- "Ah ! Voui"
- "L'amour"
- "L'amour qui rit"
- "Un bon mouvement"
- "Le beau môme"
- "Chanson des petits païens
- "Elle n'est pas si mal que ça"
- "Faut jamais dire ça aux femmes"
- "Je suis républican"
- "Mon cœur"
- "Pas pour moi"
- "Quand un soldat.."
- "Que je n'ose pas dire"
- "Viens poupoule !"
- "Si j'avais su"
- "La Petite Tonkinoise" (1905)
- "Elle est épatante"
- "Je connais une blonde"
- "Reviens"
- "Valentine"
- The Medinettes (Suzy)"
