= Théâtre des Bouffes-Parisiens =

Theatre in Paris, France

Coordinates: 48.8684°N 2.3354°E

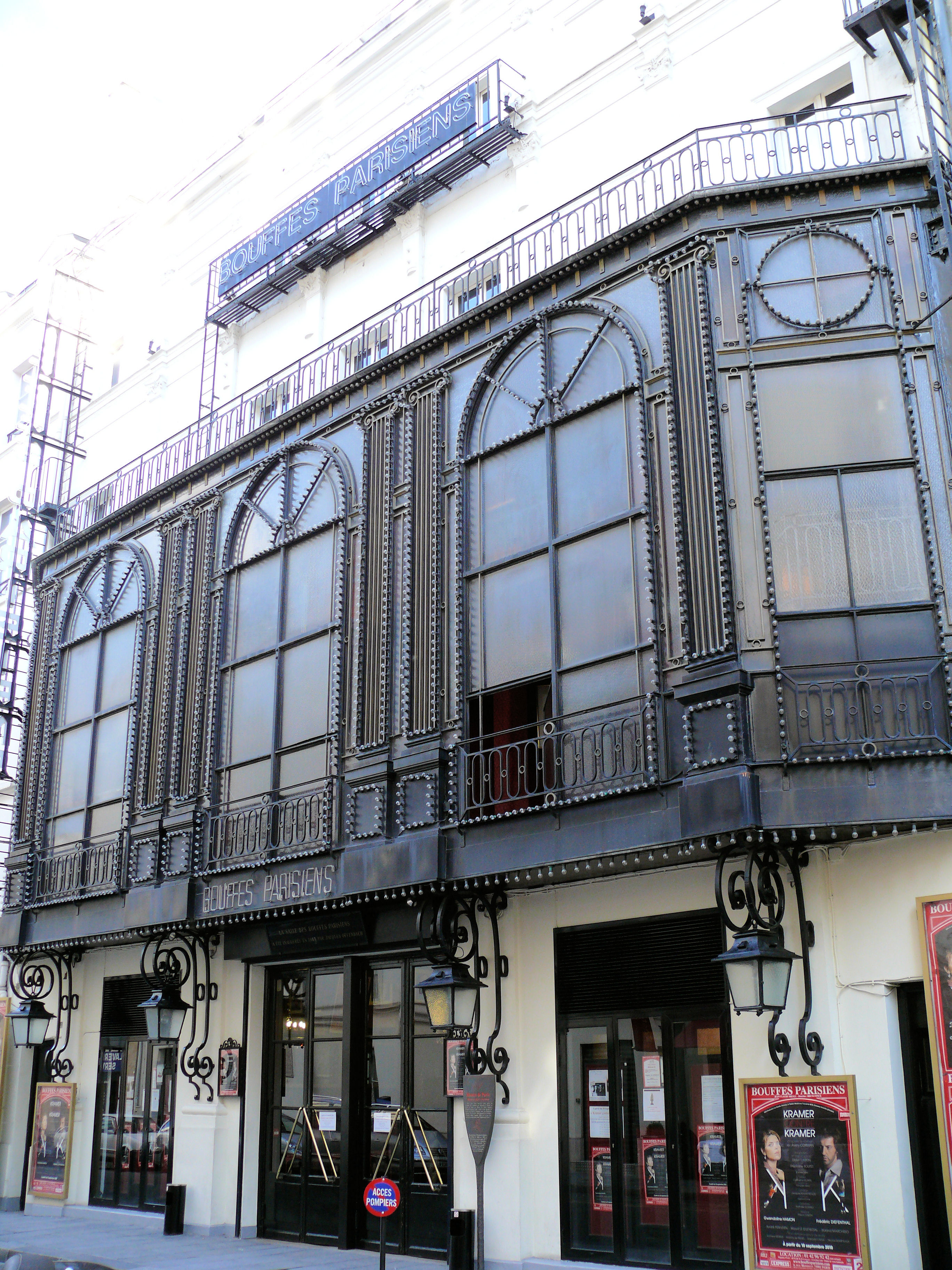
Théâtre des Bouffes-Parisiens in 2010

The Théâtre des Bouffes-Parisiens (French: [teɑtʁ de buf paʁizjɛ̃]) is a Parisian theatre founded in 1855 by the composer Jacques Offenbach for the performance of opéra bouffe and operetta. The current theatre is located in the 2nd arrondissement at 4 rue Monsigny with an entrance at the back at 65 Passage Choiseul. In the 19th century the theatre was often referred to as the Salle Choiseul. With the decline in popularity of operetta after 1870, the theatre expanded its repertory to include comedies. The theatre is still active with regular productions of stage plays.

== History ==
=== Salle Lacaze ===
In February 1855, Offenbach successfully requested a license from the Parisian authorities for the performance of what he described as a "new and original" genre of musical theatre. He justified his proposed endeavour by saying that these works would have mass appeal and would provide opportunities for young French composers.

The company gave its first performances during the summer of 1855 at the Salle Lacaze. This theatre was unusually small with a capacity of only 300 spectators, but was located on the Carré Marigny, near the crowds attending the Exposition Universelle. The inaugural performance was on 5 July with Offenbach conducting four of his own works: a prologue called Entrez, messieurs, mesdames, a one-act pièce d'occasion written by Joseph Méry and "Jules Servières" (a pen name of Ludovic Halévy, who worked as a government official and needed to protect his reputation); Une nuit blanche, a one-act opéra-comique on a pastoral theme; Arlequin barbier, a pantomime utilizing themes from Rossini's Il barbiere di Siviglia arranged by "Alfred Lange" (Offenbach); and Les deux aveugles, a one-act bouffonerie musicale about two swindling "blind" Parisian beggars. The latter was almost cut, since the invited audience who attended the dress rehearsal failed to laugh, but Offenbach decided to retain it, and it was the hit of the opening night. This little piece soon acquired an international reputation (due to visitors from the Exposition), and Offenbach's admirers soon included Tolstoy and Thackeray. Further performances in the summer of 1855 were primarily of satirical sketches which only included a few musical numbers. The season, however, was so successful that Offenbach was able to resign his position as conductor of the Théâtre Français.

=== Salle Choiseul ===
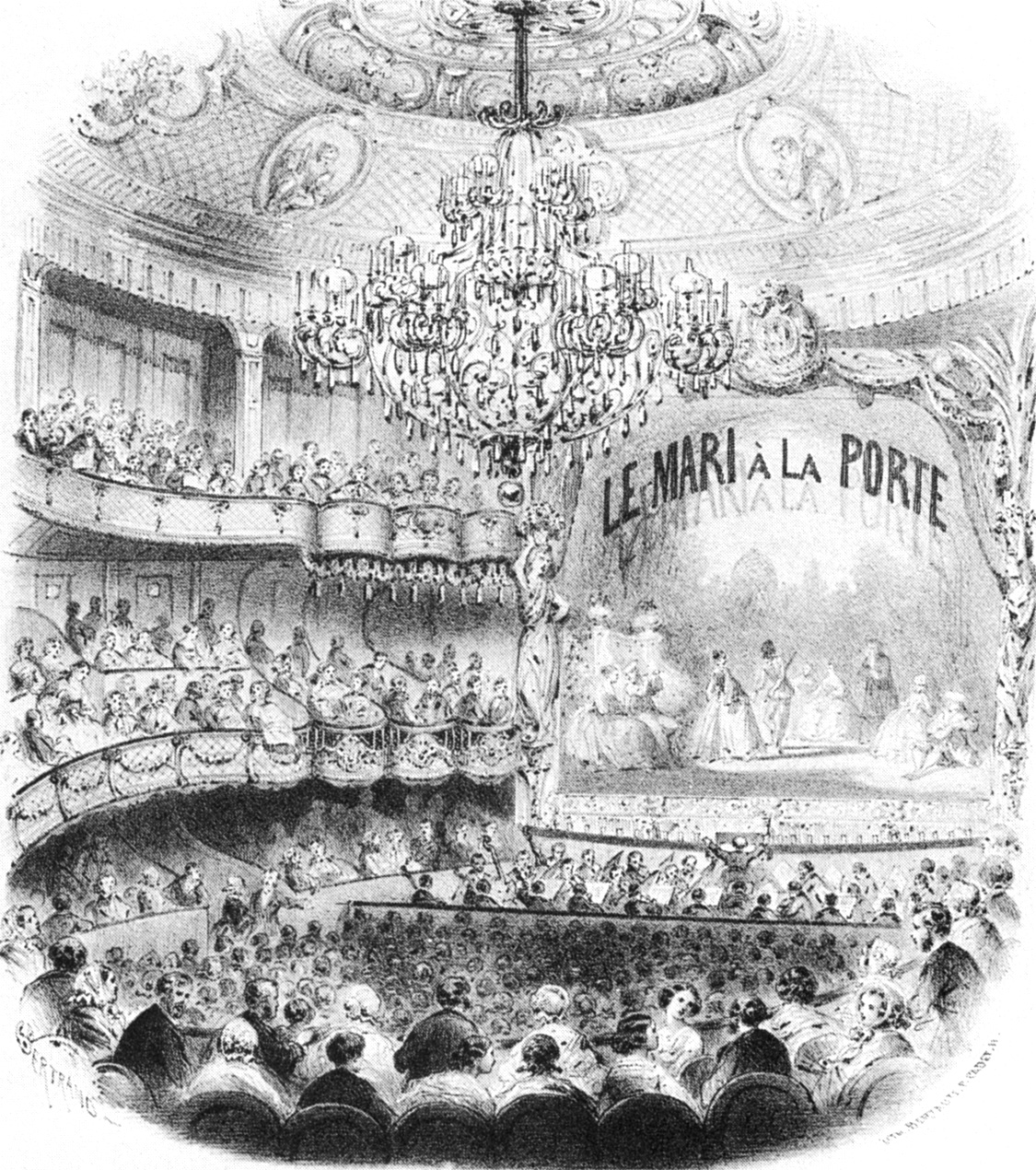
The Salle Choiseul during a performance of Offenbach's Un mari à la porte (1859)

In October Offenbach submitted another petition to the authorities, this time to merge his company with the Théâtre des Jeunes Élèves de Monsieur Comte (Théâtre Comte). This company's theatre, which was not much larger than the Salle Lacaze, was demolished, and the larger Salle Choiseul with a capacity of about 900 was constructed. The new theatre was not only larger, but warmer, more luxurious and more comfortable than the Salle Lacaze. The orchestra was enlarged from sixteen players to thirty. Offenbach's new license permitted performances of one-act comedies, with or without music, but with fewer than five characters. It also specifically excluded sketches and required the performance of at least two works by composers other than Offenbach. The first performance of the merged company was on 29 December 1855 at the Salle Choiseul and included the premiere of Offenbach's Ba-ta-clan, a one-act chinoiserie musicale with a libretto by Halévy. From this time performances were primarily given at the Salle Choiseul during the winter theatre season. The company performed at the Salle Lacaze during the 1856, 1857 and 1859 summer seasons, however, in March 1861 legislation was enacted which prevented the company from using both theatres, and appearances at the Salle Lacaze were discontinued. In spite of the restrictions of the license, Offenbach began including longer, more substantial works which violated its terms. For instance, his two-act Orphée aux enfers with a cast of 16 received its first performance at the Salle Choiseul on 21 October 1858. Even after Offenbach resigned as the director in January 1862, the company continued at the Salle Choiseul, performing light operas by other composers as well as Offenbach.

Upon the departure of Offenbach, the new director tore down the existing hall to erect a larger one with a capacity of 1100 spectators.

== Legacy ==
While the Théâtre des Bouffes-Parisiens is indelibly linked to Offenbach, it has also been the venue for a number of other important works. In addition to Offenbach's own operettas, the theatre has seen the premieres of musical works by Hervé, Emmanuel Chabrier and Claude Terrasse, and plays by writers such as Robert de Flers, Albert Willemetz, Sacha Guitry and Henri Bernstein.

From 1986 to 2007, the Théâtre des Bouffes-Parisiens was under the directorship of the actor Jean-Claude Brialy, after whose death in May 2007 his partner Bruno Finck took over. Subsequently, Dominique Dumond, director of Polyfolies assumed the leadership in September 2013.

The theatre is part of the « Théâtres parisiens associés » and more recently the stage has witnessed straight theatre such as 88 fois l'infini with Niels Arestrup and François Berléand in 2021, La Note with Sophie Marceau and François Berléand in 2023, and A Streetcar Named Desire (in French) in 2024.

== List of premieres ==
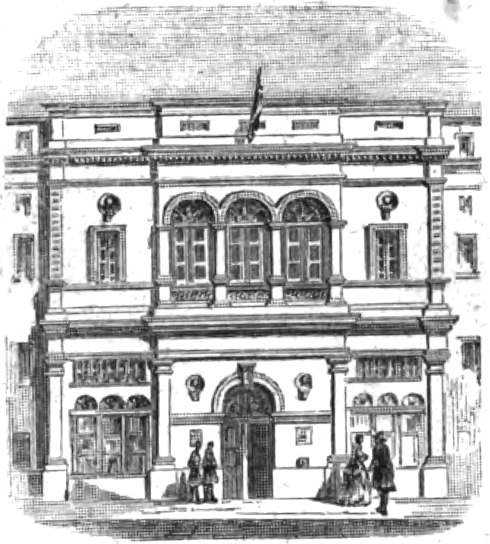
Théâtre des Bouffes-Parisiens (c. 1867)

Date	Composer	Work	Ref
29 December 1855	Jacques Offenbach	Ba-ta-clan	
29 December 1855	Auguste Pilati	Les Statues de l'Alcade	
Léo Delibes	Dieux vielles gardes		
8 April 1857	Charles Lecocq	Le docteur miracle	
9 April 1857	Georges Bizet	Le docteur miracle	
21 October 1858	Jacques Offenbach	Orphée aux enfers	
8 June 1859	Léo Delibes	L'omelette à la Follembuche	
19 November 1859	Jacques Offenbach	Geneviève de Brabant	
10 February 1860	Jacques Offenbach	Le carnaval des revues	
17 November 1866	Hervé	Les chevaliers de la table ronde	
11 January 1867	Delphine Ugalde	Halte au moulin	
16 January 1869	Charles Lecocq	Gandolfo	
19 November 1871	Charles Lecocq	Le barbier de Trouville	
3 October 1877	Gaston Serpette	La petite muette	
28 November 1877	Emmanuel Chabrier	L'étoile	
13 November 1879	Edmond Audran	Les noces d'Olivette	
16 March 1880	Louis Varney	Les mousquetaires au couvent	
29 December 1880	Edmond Audran	La mascotte	
11 November 1882	Edmond Audran	Gillette de Narbonne	
19 April 1884	Joseph O'Kelly	La Barbière improvisée	
20 March 1886	Victor Roger	Joséphine vendue par ses sœurs	
8 October 1887	Raoul Pugno	Le sosie	
19 April 1888	Raoul Pugno	Le valet de cœur	
15 October 1888	Victor Roger	Oscarine	
1 February 1889	Raoul Pugno	Le retour d'Ulysse	
18 December 1889	André Messager	Le mari de la reine	
22 April 1892	Paul Vidal	Eros	
29 March 1893	Edmond Audran	Madame Suzette	
3 November 1893	Émile Pessard	Mam'zelle Carabin	
17 October 1894	Edmond Audran	L'enlèvement de la Toledad	
6 May 1895	Gaston Serpette	La dot de Brigitte	
28 February 1896	Charles Lecocq	Ninette	
16 November 1897	André Messager	Les p'tites Michu	
10 December 1898	André Messager	Véronique	
7 March 1901	Claude Terrasse	Les travaux d'Hercule	
12 November 1918	Henri Christiné	Phi-Phi	
10 November 1921	Henri Christiné	Dédé	
31 March 1923	Maurice Yvain	Là-Haut	
22 December 1923	Maurice Yvain	La dame en décolleté	
7 March 1924	Raoul Moretti	En chemyse	
17 September 1924	Raoul Moretti	Troublez-moi	
21 April 1925	Henri Christiné	P.L.M.	
3 December 1925	Raoul Moretti	Trois jeunes filles … nues	
22 December 1926	Henri Christiné	J'aime	
9 May 1929	Joseph Szulc	Flossie	
12 December 1930	Arthur Honegger	Les aventures du roi Pausole	
19 September 1934	Moisés Simons	Toi c'est moi	

== List of directors ==
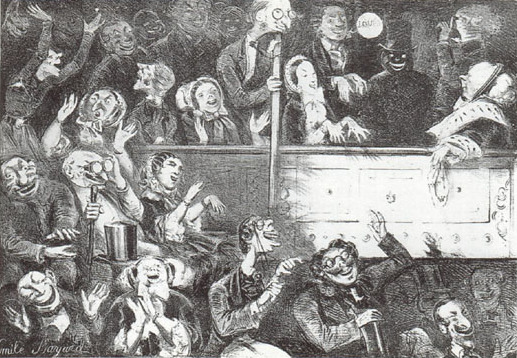
The public at the Bouffes-Parisiens (c. 1860)

The Théâtre des Bouffes-Parisiens was founded as a private entrepreneurship.

Date	Director(s)
5 July 1855	Jacques Offenbach, Charles Comte
3 February 1862	Alphonse Varney
27 September 1864	Eugène Hanappier, Armand Lapoint
17 September 1866	François Varcollier
8 July 1867	Julien-Joseph-Henry Dupontavisse, Auguste Lefranc
August 1868	Jules Noriac, Charles Comte
1870	[Closed during the Franco-Prussian War]
16 April 1871	Jules Noriac, Charles Comte
1873	Charles Comte
1877	Louis Cantin
15 October 1885	Delphine Ugalde
1 September 1888	Charles (Carlo) A. Chizzola
1889	Oscar de Lagoanère
1890	Félix Larcher
1892	Charles Masset
1893	Eugène Larcher
1895	Georges Grisier
1897	Michel-Amable Coudert
1899	Coudert and Berny
1900	Vildreux and Pezzani
15 October 1901	André Lénéka
1902	Lagoanère and Lénéka
1904	Armand Bour
1905	Monza and Darcour
October 1906	Clot and Dublay
1907	Deval and Richemond
1909	Mme Cora-Laparcerie
1913	Gustave Quinson
1927	Gustave Quinson, Albert Willemetz
1929	Albert Willemetz
1958	Nicky Nancel (Madame Mondavi)
1986	Jean-Claude Brialy
2007	Bruno Finck
