= Maurice Chevalier =

French singer, actor, and entertainer (1888–1972)

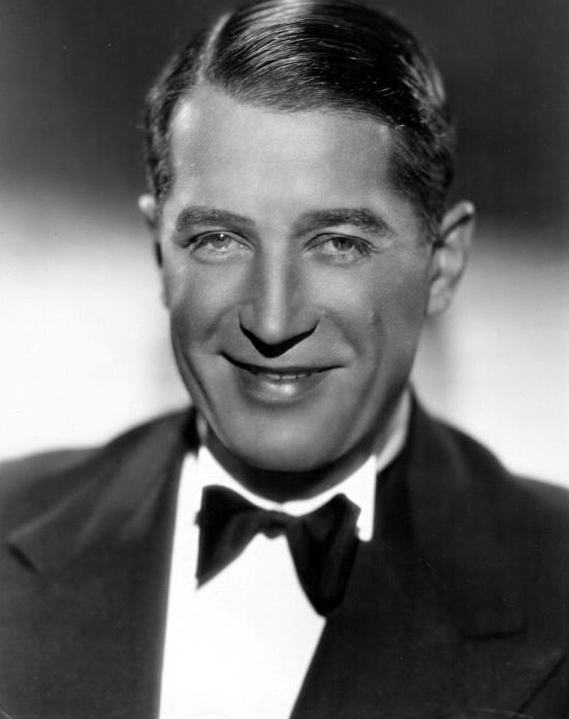
- Chevalier, early 1930s
- Born: Maurice Auguste Chevalier; 12 September 1888; Paris, France
- Died: 1 January 1972 (aged 83); Paris, France
- Occupations: Singer; actor; composer; lyricist; writer
- Years active: 1900–1970
- Spouses: Yvonne Vallée (m. 1927; div. 1932); Nita Raya (m. 1937; div. 1946)
- Musical career
- Genres: Café-concert; Music-hall; Musical theatre
- Instruments: Vocals; piano
- Labels: RCA Victor; Imperial Records; MGM Records

Maurice Auguste Chevalier (French: [mɔʁis ʃəvalje]; 12 September 1888 – 1 January 1972) was a French singer, actor, and entertainer. He is best known for his signature songs, including "Livin' In The Sunlight", "Valentine", "Louise", "Mimi", and "Thank Heaven for Little Girls", and for his films, including The Love Parade, The Big Pond, The Smiling Lieutenant, One Hour with You, and Love Me Tonight. His trademark attire was a boater hat and tuxedo.

Chevalier was born in Paris. He made his name as a star of musical comedy, appearing in public as a singer and dancer at an early age before working in menial jobs as a teenager. In 1909, he became the partner of the biggest female star in France at the time, Fréhel. Although their relationship was brief, she secured him his first major engagement, as a mimic and a singer in l'Alcazar in Marseille, for which he received critical acclaim by French theatre critics. In 1917, he discovered jazz and ragtime and went to London, where he found new success at the Palace Theatre.

After this, he toured the United States, where he met the American composers George Gershwin and Irving Berlin and brought the operetta Dédé to Broadway in 1922. He developed an interest in acting and had success in Dédé. When talkies arrived, he went to Hollywood in 1928, where he played his first American role in Innocents of Paris. In 1930, he was nominated for the Academy Award for Best Actor for his roles in The Love Parade (1929) and The Big Pond (1930), which secured his first big American hits, "You Brought a New Kind of Love to Me" and "Livin' in the Sunlight, Lovin' in the Moonlight".

In 1957, he appeared in Love in the Afternoon, which was his first Hollywood film in more than 20 years. In 1958, he starred with Leslie Caron and Louis Jourdan in Gigi. In the early 1960s, he made eight films, including Can-Can in 1960 and Fanny the following year. In 1970, he made his final contribution to the film industry where he sang the title song of the Disney film The Aristocats. He died in Paris, on 1 January 1972, from complications of a suicide attempt.

== Early life ==
Chevalier was born on 12 September 1888 in Paris to Victor Charles Chevalier (1854–1916), a French house painter, and Joséphine (née Van Den Bossche, 1852–1929) a lace-maker of Belgian (Flemish) descent. He had two brothers, Charles (1877–1938) and Paul (1884–1969). Victor, an alcoholic, deserted the family in 1896, leaving Joséphine to feed and take care of the children on her own; forced to work much longer hours, she was hospitalized for overwork in 1898. Charles, the eldest, took over some responsibilities but was married in 1900, leaving his mother to take care of Maurice and Paul on her own.

Paul was forced to find work, and eventually secured a job at a metal-engraving factory; the brothers became very close with their mother during this time, nicknaming her "La Louque", after whom Maurice would later name his Marnes-la-Coquette estate. Determined to be an acrobat, Maurice left school aged ten but was convinced to abandon this after a severe injury. He tried a number of other jobs: a carpenter's apprentice, an electrician, a printer, and even as a doll painter. Chevalier was eventually able to hold down a job at a mattress factory, and became interested in performing; while daydreaming his finger was crushed in a machine and he was forced to stop working.

While recovering, in 1900, he offered his services as a performer to the skeptical owner of a nearby café. Chevalier performed his first song there, V'la Les Croquants, although his performance was met with laughter as he had sung three octaves too high. Discouraged, Maurice returned home, where his mother and brother Paul encouraged him to continue practising. He continued singing, unpaid, at the café until a member of the theatre saw him and suggested he audition for a local musical. Chevalier got the part, and began to make a name as a mimic and a singer. His act in l'Alcazar in Marseille was so successful, on his return to Paris he was met by an admiring crowd.

In 1909, he became the partner of the biggest female star in France, Fréhel. However, due to her alcoholism and drug addiction, their liaison ended in 1911. Chevalier later said that he became addicted to cocaine during this time, a habit that he was able to quit because he had no access to the drug as a prisoner of war in World War I. After splitting with Fréhel, he then started a relationship with 36-year-old Mistinguett at the Folies Bergère, where he was her younger dance partner; they eventually played out a public romance.

== World War I ==
When World War I began, Chevalier was in the middle of his national service, already in the front line, where he was wounded by shrapnel in the back in the first weeks of combat and was taken as a prisoner of war in Germany for two years, where he learned English. In 1916, he was released through the secret intervention of Mistinguett's admirer, King Alfonso XIII of Spain, the only king of a neutral country who was related to both the British and German royal families.

In 1917, Chevalier became a star in le Casino de Paris and played before British soldiers and Americans. He discovered jazz and ragtime and started thinking about touring the United States. In the prison camp, he had studied English and had an advantage over other French artists. He went to London, where he found new success at the Palace Theatre, even though he still sang in French.

== Paris and Hollywood ==
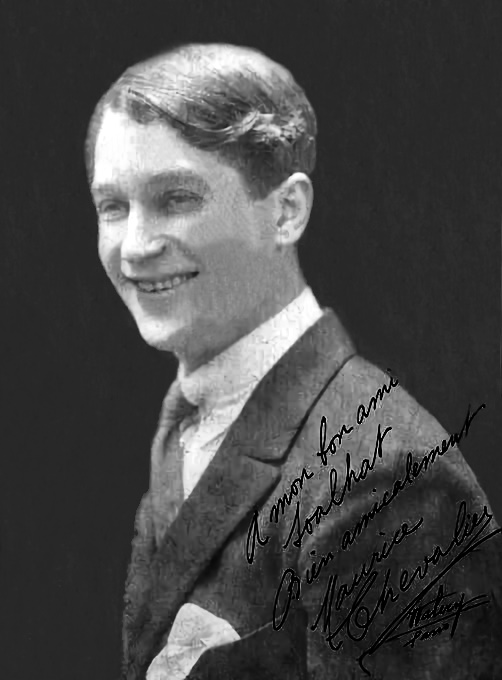
Chevalier in 1920

After the war, Chevalier went back to Paris and created several songs still known today, such as "Valentine" (1924). He played in a few pictures, including Chaplin's A Woman of Paris (1923), a rare drama for Chaplin, in which his character of The Tramp does not appear, and made an impression in the operetta Dédé. He met the American composers George Gershwin and Irving Berlin and brought Dédé to Broadway in 1922. The same year he met Yvonne Vallée, a young dancer, who became his wife in 1927.

When Douglas Fairbanks was on honeymoon in Paris in 1920, he offered him star billing with his new wife Mary Pickford, but Chevalier doubted his own talent for silent movies (his previous ones had largely failed). When sound arrived, he made his Hollywood debut in 1928. He signed a contract with Paramount Pictures and played his first American role in Innocents of Paris. In 1930, he was nominated for the Academy Award for Best Actor for his roles in The Love Parade (1929) and The Big Pond (1930). The Big Pond gave Chevalier his first big American hit songs: "Livin' in the Sunlight, Lovin' in the Moonlight" with words and music by Al Lewis and Al Sherman, plus "A New Kind of Love" (or "The Nightingales"). He collaborated with film director Ernst Lubitsch. He appeared in Paramount's all-star revue film Paramount on Parade (1930).

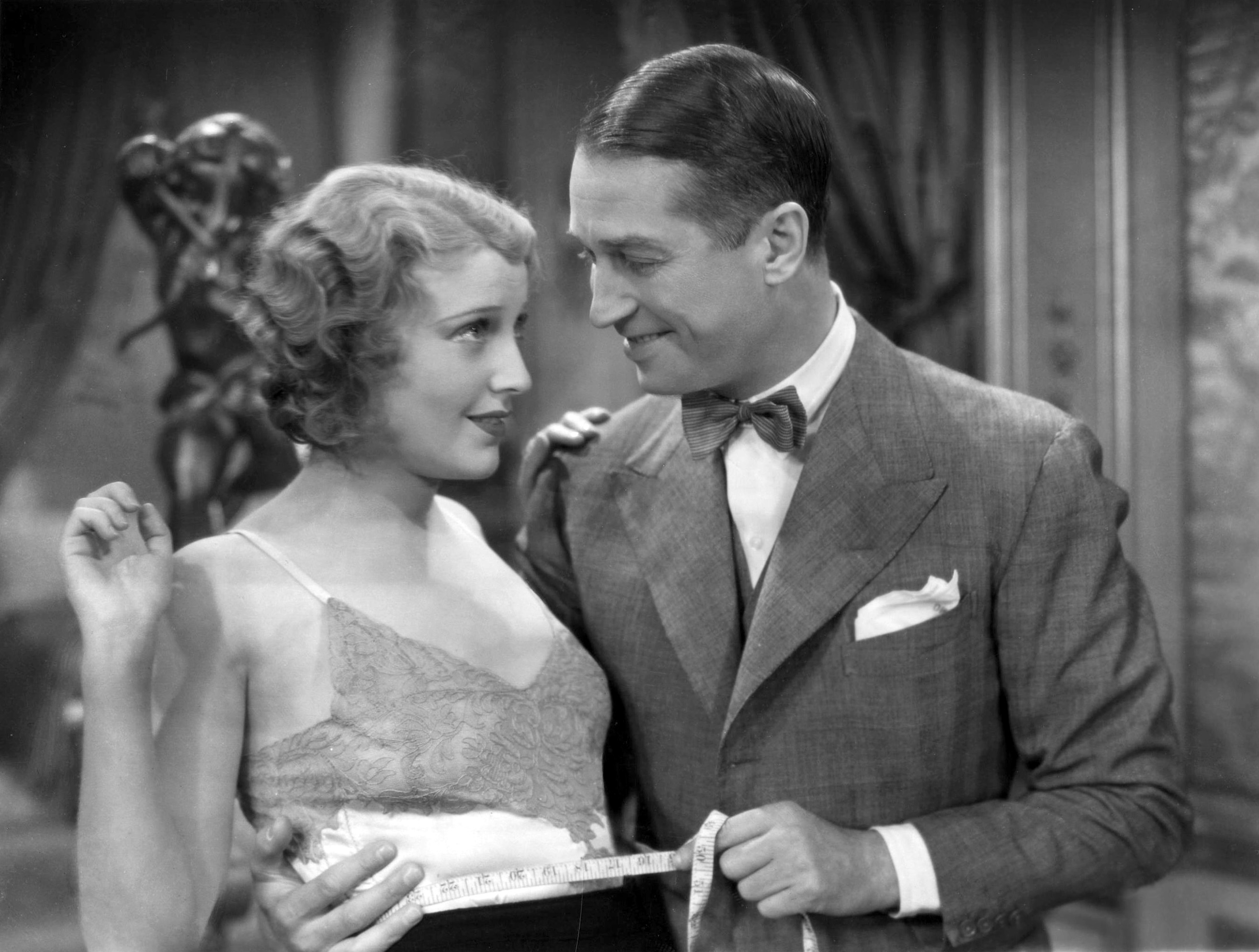
With Jeanette MacDonald in Love Me Tonight (1932)

While Chevalier was under contract with Paramount, his name was so recognized that his passport was featured in the Marx Brothers film Monkey Business (1931). In this sequence, each brother uses Chevalier's passport, and tries to sneak off the ocean liner where they were stowaways by claiming to be the singer—with unique renditions of "You Brought a New Kind of Love to Me" with its line "If the nightingales could sing like you". In 1931, Chevalier starred in a musical called The Smiling Lieutenant with Claudette Colbert and Miriam Hopkins. Despite the disdain audiences held for musicals in 1931, it proved a successful film.

In 1932, he starred with Jeanette MacDonald in Paramount's film musical One Hour With You, which became a success and one of the films instrumental in making musicals popular again. Due to its popularity, Paramount starred Maurice Chevalier in another musical called Love Me Tonight (also 1932), and again co-starring Jeanette MacDonald. It is about a tailor who falls in love with a princess when he goes to a castle to collect a debt and is mistaken for a baron. Featuring songs by Richard Rodgers and Lorenz Hart, it was directed by Rouben Mamoulian, who, with the help of the songwriters, was able to put into the score his ideas of the integrated musical (a musical which blends songs and dialogue so the songs advance the plot). It is considered one of the greatest film musicals of all time.

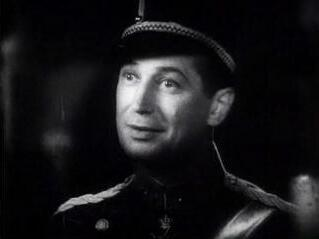
In The Merry Widow (1934)

In 1934, he starred in the first sound film of the Franz Lehár operetta The Merry Widow, one of his best-known films, though he felt his role was too narrow and repetitive. He then signed with MGM for The Man from the Folies Bergère, his own favourite of his films. After a disagreement over his star-billing, he returned to France in 1935 to resume his music-hall career.

Even when he was the highest-paid star in Hollywood, Chevalier had a reputation as a penny-pincher. He later admitted that he was hesitant to spend money on things such as changing the blade of his razor as he had grown up in poverty, remarking that "poverty is a disease that can never be cured." When not playing around with young chorus-girls, he actually felt quite lonely, and sought the company of Adolphe Menjou and Charles Boyer, also French, but both much better educated than Chevalier. Boyer in particular introduced him to art galleries and good literature, and Chevalier would try to copy him as the man of taste. But at other times, he would 'revert to type' as the bitter and impoverished street-kid he was at heart. When performing in English, he always put on a heavy French accent, although his normal spoken English was quite fluent and sounded more American.

In 1937, Chevalier married the dancer Nita Raya. He had several successes, such as his revue Paris en Joie in the Casino de Paris. A year later, he performed in Amours de Paris. His songs remained big hits, such as "Prosper" (1935), "Ma Pomme" (1936) and "Ça fait d'excellents français" (1939).

== World War II ==
Chevalier continued performing for as long as he could freely, retreating to the free zone in the south of France with his Jewish wife and her parents as well as some friends following the 1940 invasion by German troops. During this time, patriotic songs such as "Ça sent si bon la France" and "Paris sera toujours Paris" became popular, and he held charity balls and performed to raise money for resistance efforts. Chevalier consistently refused to perform for the Vichy France collaborators, and feigned illness, but eventually, out of fear for the safety of his wife and her parents, he reluctantly agreed to a deal. He refused to perform on the collaborating station Radio Paris, but agreed to perform for prisoners of war at the very camp in which he had been incarcerated during World War I. The performance was given in exchange for the release of ten French prisoners.

In 1942, Chevalier was named on a list of French collaborators with Germany to be killed during the war, or tried after it. That year he moved to La Bocca, near Cannes, but returned to the capital city in September. In 1944 when Allied forces freed France, Chevalier was accused of collaboration. The 28 August 1944, issue of Stars and Stripes, the daily newspaper of U.S. armed forces in the European Theater of Operations, reported in error that "Maurice Chevalier Slain By Maquis, Patriots Say". Even though he was acquitted by a French convened court, the English-speaking press remained hostile and he was refused a visa for several years. In a review of the 1969 Oscar-nominated documentary film about French collaboration Le chagrin et la pitié (The Sorrow and the Pity), Simon Heffer draws attention to "a clip of Maurice Chevalier explaining, entirely dishonestly, to an anglophone audience how he had not collaborated."

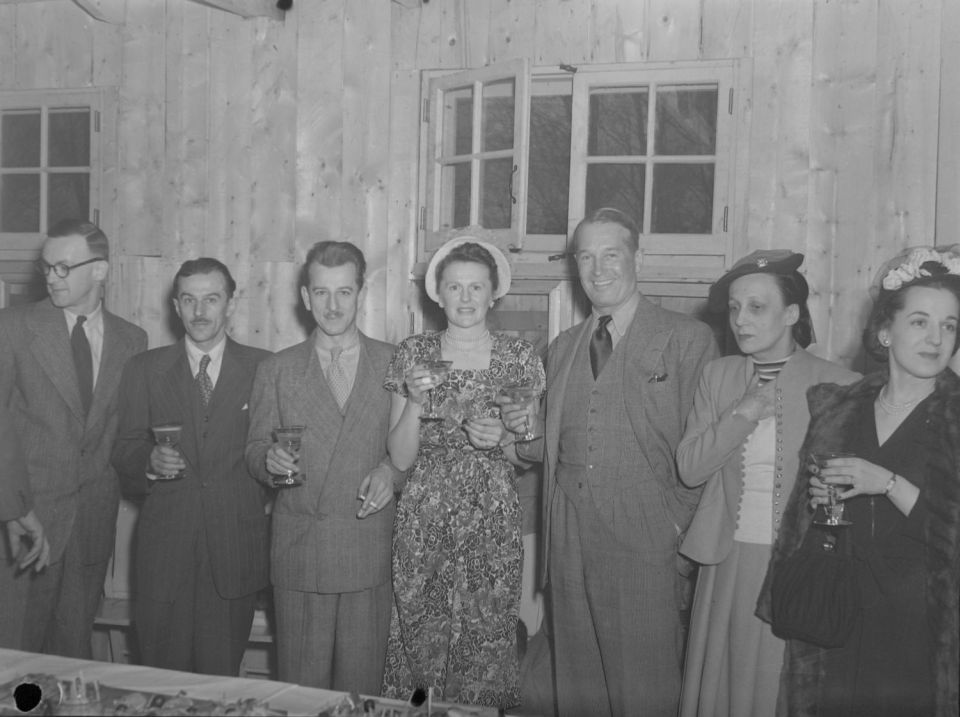
Drinks after golf in 1948 in Montreal

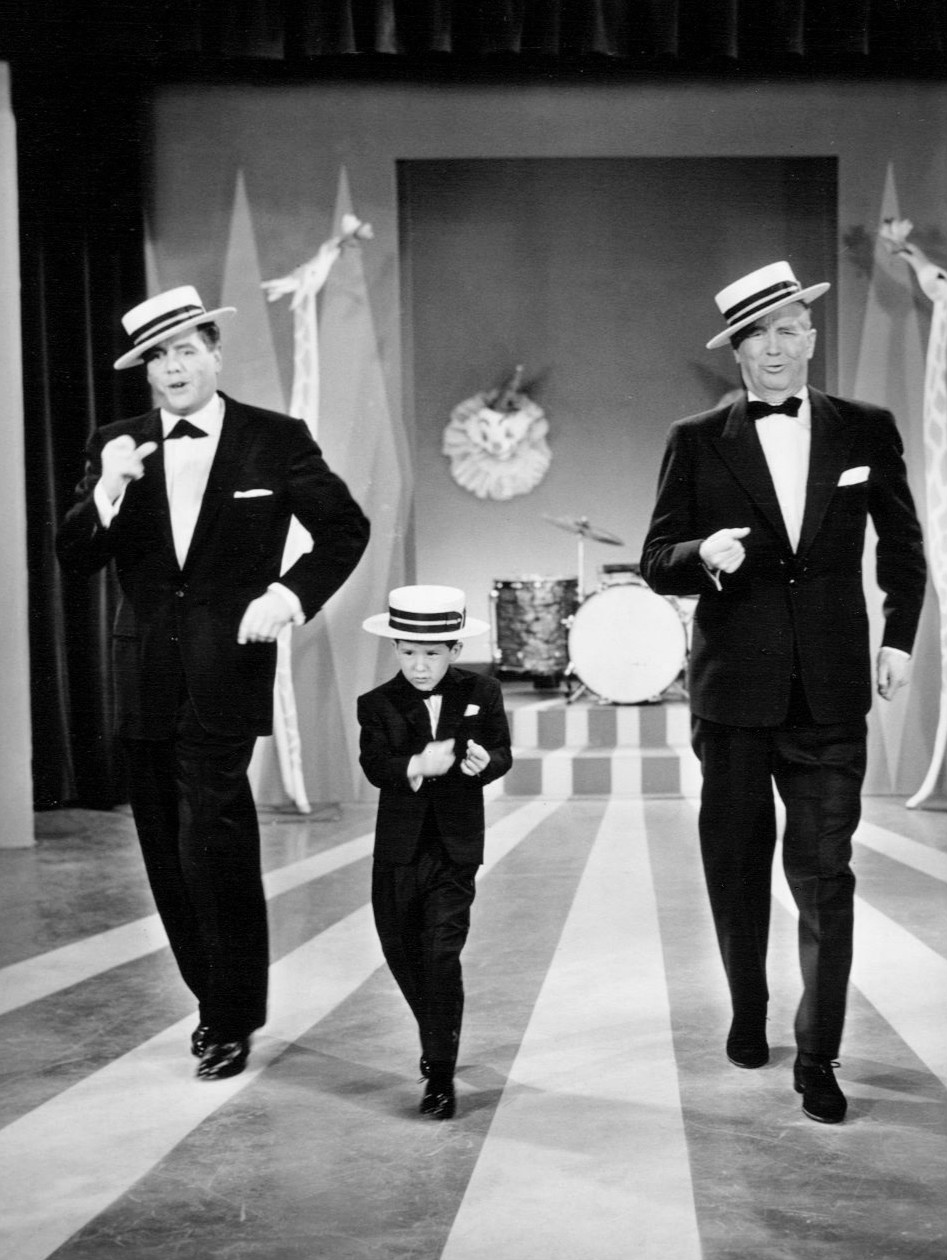
Desi Arnaz, Richard Keith, and Maurice Chevalier in "Lucy Goes to Mexico", an episode of The Lucy-Desi Comedy Hour (1958)

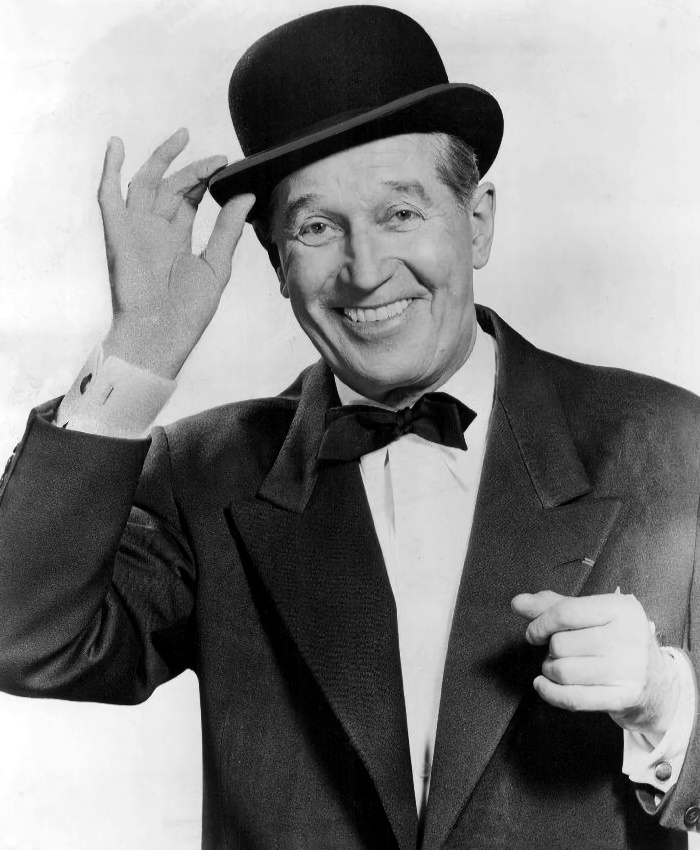
Chevalier in 1959

In his own country, however, he was still popular. In 1946, he split from Nita Raya and, at the age of 58, began writing his memoirs, which took many years to complete.

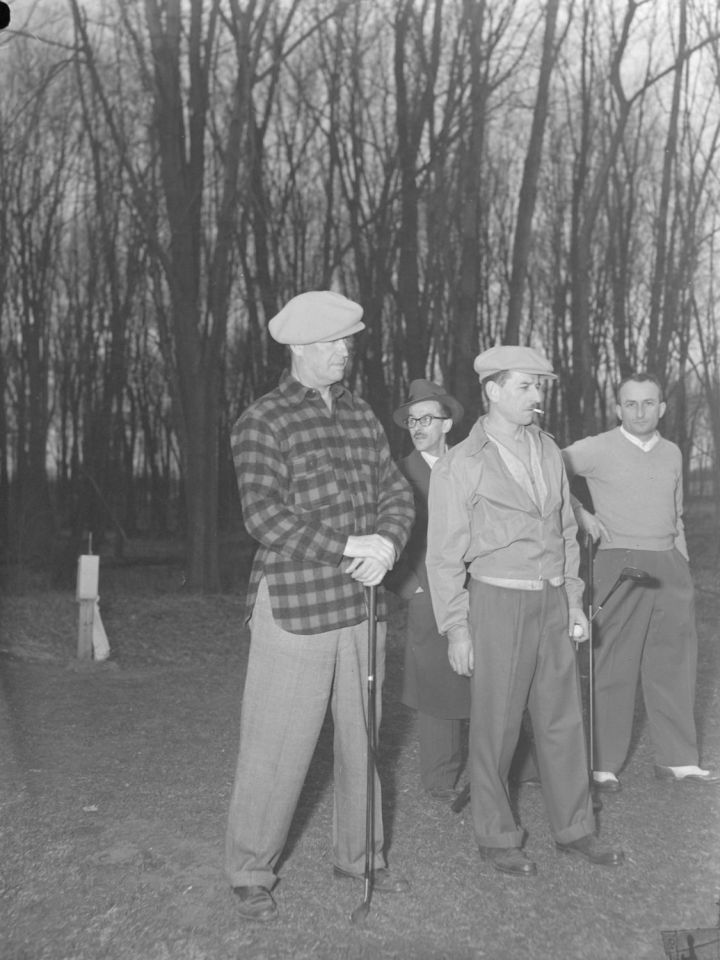
Playing golf (in plaid) in 1948 in Montreal

He started to collect art and paint, and acted in Le silence est d'or (Man About Town) (1946) by René Clair. He toured throughout the United States and other parts of the world, then returned to France in 1948.

In 1944, he had participated in a Communist demonstration in Paris. He was therefore even less popular in the U.S. during the McCarthyism period; in 1951, he was refused re-entry into the U.S. because he had signed the Stockholm Appeal.

In 1949, he performed in Stockholm in a Communist benefit against nuclear arms. Also in 1949, Chevalier was the subject of the first official roast at the New York Friars' Club, although celebrities had been informally "roasted" at banquets since 1910.

In 1952, he bought a large property in Marnes-la-Coquette, near Paris, and named it La Louque, as a homage to his mother's nickname. He started a relationship in 1952 with Janie Michels, a young divorcee with three children.

In 1954, after the McCarthy era abated, Chevalier was welcomed back in the United States. His first full American tour was in 1955, with Vic Schoen as arranger and musical director. The Billy Wilder film Love in the Afternoon (1957) with Audrey Hepburn and Gary Cooper, was his first Hollywood film in more than 20 years.

In 1957, Chevalier was awarded The George Eastman Award, given by George Eastman House for distinguished contribution to the art of film.

Chevalier appeared in the movie musical Gigi (1958) with Leslie Caron and Hermione Gingold, with whom he shared the song "I Remember It Well", and several Walt Disney films. The success of Gigi prompted the presentation of an Academy Honorary Award to Chevalier in 1959 "for his contributions to the world of entertainment for more than half a century." In 1957, he appeared as himself in an episode of The Jack Benny Program titled "Jack in Paris". He also appeared as himself in an episode of The Lucy-Desi Comedy Hour, titled "Lucy Goes to Mexico".

== Final years ==
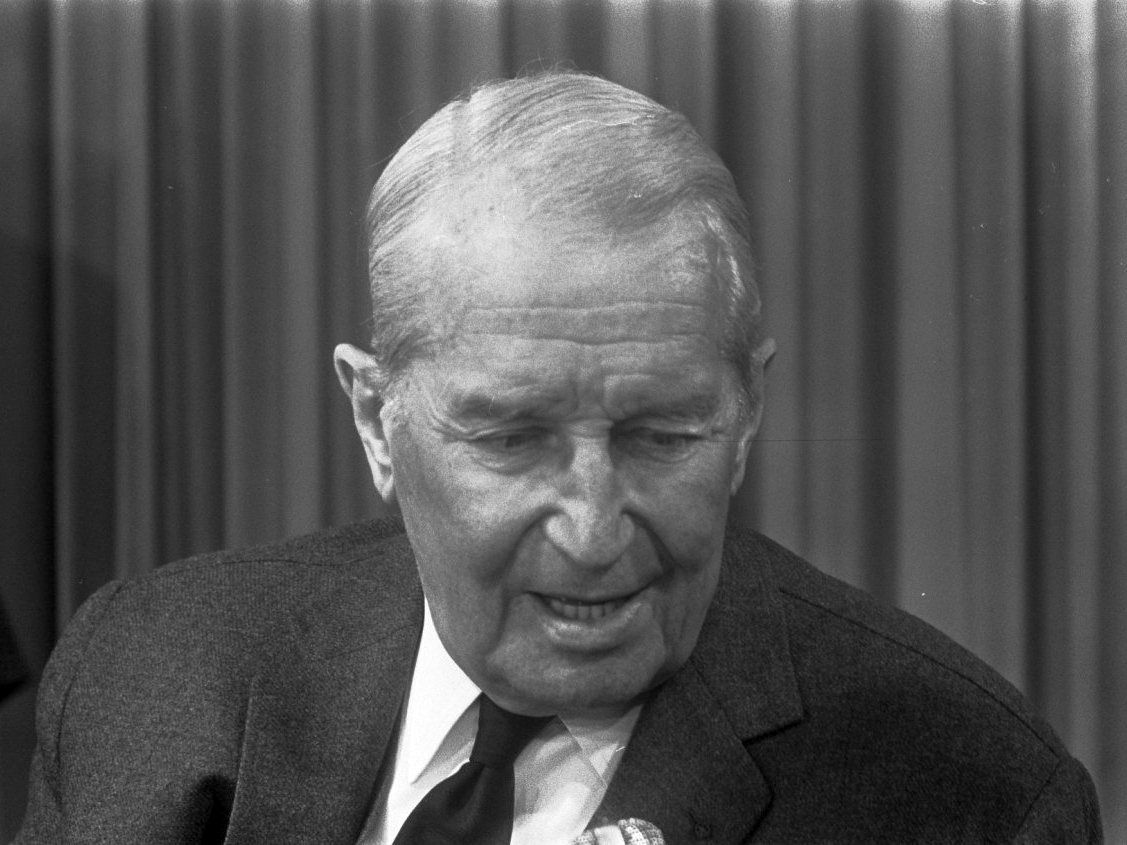
Maurice Chevalier, 1968

In the early 1960s, he toured the United States and between 1960 and 1963 made eight films, including Can-Can (1960) with Frank Sinatra. In 1961, he starred in the drama Fanny with Leslie Caron and Charles Boyer, an updated version of Marcel Pagnol's "Marseilles Trilogy". In 1962, he filmed Panic Button (not released until 1964), playing opposite Jayne Mansfield. In 1965, at age 77, he made another world tour. In 1967 he toured in Latin America, again, the US, Europe and Canada, where he appeared as a special guest at Expo 67. The following year, on 1 October 1968, he announced his farewell tour. That October, his final major US single was released, a duet with Jimmy Durante titled "Dear World". It reached No. 30 on the Billboard Easy Listening chart.

Historical newsreel footage of Chevalier appeared in the 1969 Marcel Ophüls documentary The Sorrow and the Pity. In a wartime short film near the end of the film's second part, he explained his disappearance during World War II, as rumors of his death lingered at that time, and he emphatically denied any collaboration with the Nazis. His theme song, "Sweepin' the Clouds Away", from the film Paramount on Parade (1930), was one of the film's theme songs and was played in the end credits of the second part. In 1970, two years after his retirement, songwriters Richard M. and Robert B. Sherman convinced him to sing the title song of the Disney film The Aristocats, which ended up being his final contribution to the film industry.

== Death and burial ==
Chevalier suffered from bouts of depression throughout his adult life. On 7 March 1971, he attempted suicide by overdosing on barbiturates. Rushed to the hospital, Chevalier was saved but suffered liver and kidney damage as a result of the drug. In the following months, he suffered memory lapses, chronic tiredness, and spent much of his time alone. On 12 December, he fell ill and was taken to Paris's Necker Hospital and placed on dialysis. By 30 December, doctors announced his kidneys were no longer responding to dialysis. Too frail for a transplant, he underwent surgery as a last-ditch effort to save his life. It was unsuccessful; Chevalier died from a cardiac arrest following kidney surgery on New Year's Day 1972, aged 83.

He is interred in the cemetery of Marnes-la-Coquette in Hauts-de-Seine, outside Paris, France, with his mother, "La Louque".

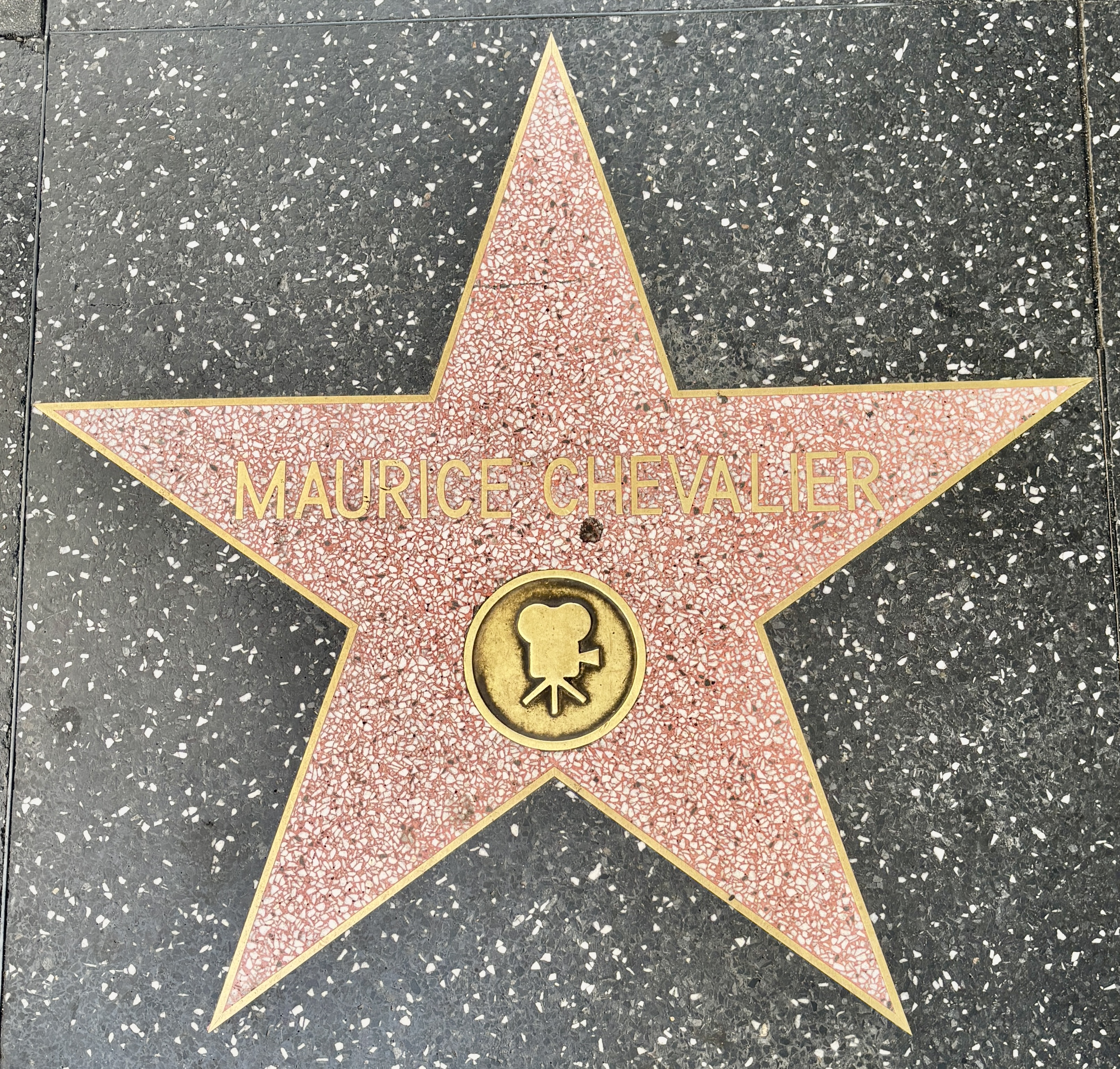
Hollywood Walk of Fame star

Chevalier has a star on the Hollywood Walk of Fame at 1651 Vine Street.

Author Michael Freedland said in his 1981 biography of Chevalier that the actor Felix Paquet, who became close to Chevalier during the 1960s, cut off contact with all of his friends and family in hopes of securing access to his fortune. Freedland alleges that Paquet, eighteen years Chevalier's junior, intercepted mail and withheld information about Maurice's health in the months before his death.

== Notable songs ==
- "Le beau gosse" (1908)
- "La madelon de la victoire" (1918)
- "Oh ! Maurice" (1919)
- "Je n'peux pas vivre sans amour" (1921)
- "Dans la vie faut pas s'en faire" (1921)
- "C'est Paris" (1923)
- "Les ananas" (1924)
- "Quand on est deux" (1924)
- "Valentine" (1925)
- "Chacun son truc" (1926)
- "Dites-moi, ma Mère" (1927)
- "Louise" (1929)
- "Paris je t'aime d'amour" (1930)
- "My Love Parade" (1930)
- "(Up On Top Of A Rainbow) Sweepin' The Clouds Away" (1930)
- "You Brought a New Kind of Love to Me" (1930)
- "Living In the Sunlight, Loving In the Moonlight" (1930)
- "My Ideal" (1930)
- "Hello beautiful!" (1931)
- "One hour with you" (1932)
- "Isn't it Romantic" (1932)
- "Mimi" (1932)
- "Oh ! That Mitzi" (1932)
- "Singing a happy song" (1935)
- "Donnez-moi la main" (1935)
- "Quand un Vicomte" (1935)
- "Prosper" (1935)
- "Dupont, Dubois, Durand" (1935)
- "Ma Pomme" (1936)
- "Le Chapeau de Zozo" (1936)
- "Y'a d'la joie" (1937)
- "L'amour est passé près de vous" (1937)
- "Ah ! si vous connaissez ma poule" (1938)
- "Ça s'est passé un Dimanche" (1939)
- "Il pleurait" (1939)
- "Ça fait d'excellents Français" (1939)
- "Appelez ça comme vous voulez" (1939)
- "Mimile" (1939)
- "Paris sera toujours Paris" (1939)
- "Notre Espoir" (1941)
- "Toi… toi… toi…" (1941)
- "Ça sent si bon la France" (1941)
- "La chanson du maçon" (1941)
- "La Marche de Ménilmontant" (1942)
- "La symphonie des semelles en bois" (1942)
- "La fête a Neu-Neu" (1944)
- "Fleur de Paris" (1945)
- "La chanson populaire" (1945)
- "Quai de Bercy" (1946)
- "Place Pigalle" (1946)
- "Folies-Bergère" (1948)
- "Ça va… ça va !" (1948)
- "Mannekin-pis" (1949)
- "C'est fini" (1949)
- "Sur l'Avenue Foch" (1950)
- "L'objet" (1951)
- "Un télégramme" (1952)
- "Quand la bâtiment va…" (1953)
- "Demain j'ai vingt ans" (1954)
- "Deux amoureux sur un banc (1954)
- "Chapeau de paille" (1954)
- "Thank Heaven For Little Girls" (1958)
- "I Remember It Well" (1958)
- "Ah ! Donnez m'en de la chanson" (1961)
- "Enjoy It!" (1962)
- "Le twist du canotier" (1962)
- "Jolies mômes de mon quartier" (1962)
- "Moi, avec une chanson" (1962)
- "Au Revoir" (1965)
- "Le sous-marin vert" (1966)
- "Sourire aux lèvres" (1966)
- "I'm gonna shine today" (1967)
- "Joi De Vivre" (1967)
- "The Aristocats" (1970)

== Selected filmography ==
- Par habitude (1911)
- Gonzague (1923) – Gonzague / Maurice
- Bad Boy (1923) – Le mauvais garçon
- Jim Bougne, boxeur (1923) – Maurice
- L'affaire de la rue de Lourcine (1923) – Lenglené
- Hello New York! (1928) – Himself
- Innocents of Paris (1929) – Maurice Marney
- The Love Parade (1929) – Count Alfred Renard
- Paramount on Parade (1930) – Himself
- Paramount en Parade (1930) – Apache – Episode 'Origin of the Apache' / 'Park in Paris' / Finale
- The Big Pond (1930) – Pierre Mirande
- La grande mare (1930) – Pierre Mirande
- Playboy of Paris (1930) – Albert Loriflan
- Paramount on Parade (1930)
- The Little Cafe (1931) – Albert Lorifian
- The Smiling Lieutenant (1931) – Lt. Nikolaus 'Niki' von Preyn
- Monkey Business (1931) – Himself (voice, uncredited)
- One Hour with You (1932) – Dr. Andre Bertier
- Make Me a Star (1932) – Himself (uncredited)
- Love Me Tonight (1932) – Maurice
- A Bedtime Story (1933) – Monsieur Rene
- The Way to Love (1933) – François
- L'amour guide (1933) – François
- The Merry Widow (1934) – Prince Danilo
- La Veuve joyeuse (1935) – Danilo
- Folies Bergère de Paris (1935) – Eugene Charlier / Baron Fernand Cassini
- The Beloved Vagabond (1936) – Gaston de Nerac 'Paragot'
- With a Smile (1936) – Victor Larnois
- The Man of the Hour (1937) – Alfred Boulard / Himself
- Break the News (1938) – François Verrier
- Personal Column (1939) – Robert Fleury
- Man About Town (1947) – Emile Clément
- The King (1949) – The King Jean IV de Cerdagne
- Just Me (1950) – Maurice Vallier dit 'Ma Pomme'
- Jouons le jeu (1952) – Himself
- Hit Parade (1953) – Himself – Singer
- 100 Years of Love (1954) – Massimo (segment "Amore 1954")
- My Seven Little Sins (1954) – Comte André de Courvallon
- Love in the Afternoon (1957) – Claude Chavasse
- Gigi (1958) – Honoré Lachaille
- Count Your Blessings (1959) – Duc de St. Cloud
- Can-Can (1960) – Paul Barriere
- A Breath of Scandal (1960) – Prince Philip
- Pepe (1960) – Maurice Chevalier
- Fanny (1961) – Panisse
- Black Tights (1961) – Himself – Presenter
- Jessica (1962) – Father Antonio
- In Search of the Castaways (1962) – Jacques Paganel
- A New Kind of Love (1963) – Maurice Chevalier
- Panic Button (1964) – Philippe Fontaine
- I'd Rather Be Rich (1964) – Philip Dulaine
- La chance et l'amour (1964) – Himself (segment "Les interviews-vérités")
- Monkeys, Go Home! (1967) – Father Sylvain (final film role)
- Aristocats (1970) - Theme song

== See also ==
- List of actors with Academy Award nominations

== Bibliography ==
- MacDiarmid, Hugh, "The Scottish Renaissance: The Next Step", in Holroyd, Ian F., and Stedman, Iain F.B. (eds.), Jabberwock: Edinburgh University Review, Vol. III, No. 2, Summer 1950, Edinburgh University Students' Representative Council, pp. 3 – 7
- Chevalier, Maurice (1949). The Man in the Straw Hat, My Story. New York: Crowell.
- Bret, David (1992). Maurice Chevalier: Up on Top of a Rainbow. Robson Books. ISBN 9780860517894. Authorised by René and Lucette Chevalier
- Chevalier, Maurice; Eileen and Robert Pollock (1960). With Love. Boston: Little, Brown.
- Chevalier, Maurice (1970). Schoffie met wit haar. Utrecht/Antwerpen: A.W. Bruna & Zoon. ISBN 90-229-7116-3.
- Chevalier, Maurice (1970). I Remember It Well. New York: Macmillan.
- Gene Ringgold and DeWitt Bodeen (1973). Chevalier. The Films and Career of Maurice Chevalier. Secaucus, New Jersey: The Citadel Press. ISBN 0-8065-0354-8.
