= Albert Willemetz =

French librettist (1887–1964)

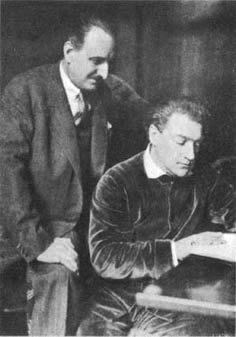
- Albert Willemetz and Sacha Guitry
- Born: February 14, 1887
- Died: October 7, 1964 (aged 77)
- Occupation: librettist

Albert Willemetz (14 February 1887 – 7 October 1964) was a French librettist.

== Career ==
Albert Willemetz was a prolific lyricist. He invented a new type of musical, with a humorous and "sexy" style. He was the author of more than 3000 songs, including "Mon homme" (popularized in English as "My Man"), "Valentine," "Dans la vie faut pas s'en faire," "Les palétuviers," "Ramona," "Est-ce que je te demande," "Ah si vous connaissiez ma poule," "Amusez-vous," and "Félicie aussi"), more than 100 musicals (including Phi-Phi, Ta Bouche, Là-Haut, Dédé, 3 jeunes filles nues, Florestan 1er, and Trois Valses), more than 100 revues (including seven with Sacha Guitry), and work for films.

He worked with some of the notable musicians of his day, including André Messager, Maurice Yvain, Arthur Honegger, Henri Christiné, José Padilla, Vincent Scotto, Reynaldo Hahn, Raoul Moretti, Moises Simons, Georges Van Parys, Henri Betti, Szulc, Borel-Clerc, Oberfeld, Romberg, Lopez, Richepin, and Lattès.

Some of the singers who have sung his lyrics include Maurice Chevalier, Fanny Brice, Yvonne Printemps, Mistinguett, Billie Holiday, Ella Fitzgerald, Barbra Streisand, Arletty, Josephine Baker, Danielle Darrieux, Pauline Carton, Fernandel, Bourvil, Dranem, Henri Garat, Victor Boucher, Jean Gabin, Pierre Fresnay, Michel Simon and Léo Ferré.

Additionally, Albert Willemetz served as Secretary to Clemenceau, the Director of the Théâtre des Bouffes Parisiens for 30 years, and was President of the SACEM (from 1945), and CISAC (1956). He was the only president of both organizations not to be able to read music. He died in Marnes-la-Coquette, near Paris.

== Selected filmography ==
- Phi-Phi (1927, based on the operetta Phi-Phi)
- Trois jeunes filles nues (1929, based on the operetta Trois jeunes filles nues)
- Tossing Ship (1932, based on the operetta Coups de roulis)
- Passionately (1932, based on the operetta Passionnément)
- La Pouponnière (1933, based on the operetta La Pouponnière)
- Un soir de réveillon (1933, based on the operetta Un soir de réveillon)
- Les Surprises du sleeping (1933, based on the musical comedy Couchette No.3)
- Sidonie Panache (1934, based on the operetta Sidonie Panache)
- Dédé (1935, based on the operetta Dédé)
- Three Waltzes (1938, based on the operetta Drei Walzer)
- No Love Allowed (1942, based on the operetta Yes!)
- The Dream of Andalusia (Spanish-language version, 1951, based on the operetta Andalousie)
  - Andalusia (French-language version, 1951, based on the operetta Andalousie)

=== Screenwriter ===
- J'ai quelque chose à vous dire (1931, short film)
- Make a Living (1931)
- La Bande à Bouboule (1931)
- He Is Charming (French-language version, 1932)
  - Students in Paris (Swedish-language version, 1932)

== Honours and awards ==
- Commandeur of the Order of Legion of Honour (1953)
