= Yvonne Vallée =

French actress (1899–1996)

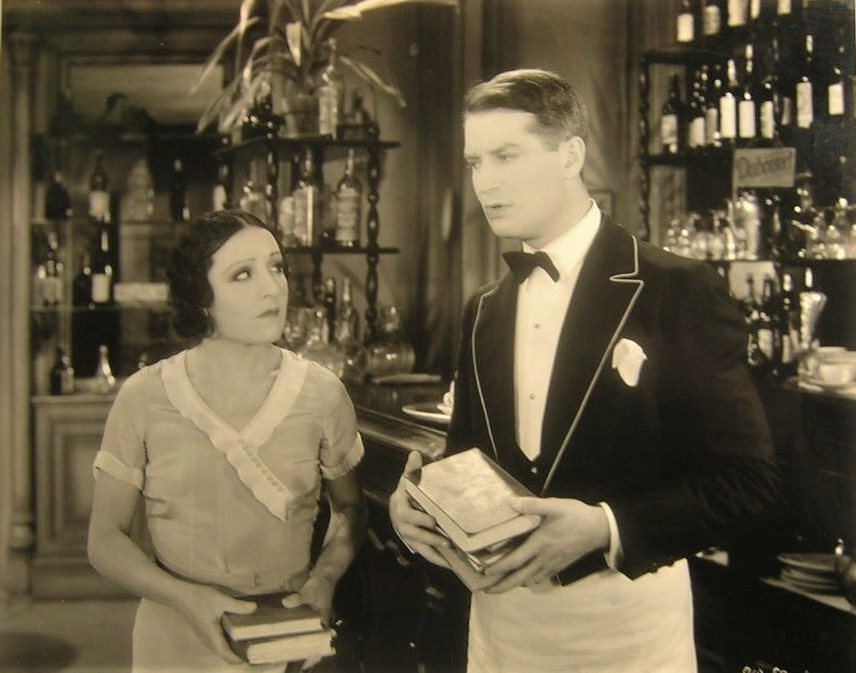
- Yvonne Vallée and Maurice Chevalier in The Little Cafe
- Born: Marguerite Yvonne Vallee; February 21, 1899; Bordeaux, France
- Died: June 15, 1996 (aged 97); Vallauris, France
- Occupation: actress
- Years active: 1928-1931
- Spouse: Maurice Chevalier (1927-1932) (divorced)

Yvonne Vallée (February 21, 1899 – June 15, 1996) was a French actress.

== Life ==
Vallée was born Marguerite Yvonne Vallee in Bordeaux in 1899. She was the wife of Maurice Chevalier from 1927 to 1933. She died in Vallauris, France in 1996, aged 97. She is buried in the Cimetière du Grand Jas in Cannes (Alpes-Maritimes).

== Career ==
Before their marriage, Vallée was Chevalier's music hall dancing partner.

She performed operetta often alongside Chevalier and was in the ensemble for the Paris debut of Belle of New York.

Reportedly she met Chevalier in 1924 during his period of depression on return to France from a failed venture in New York City; this culminated in attempted suicide, but things turned around for Chevalier and he married Vallée three years later.

The pair is featured in the photograph "Réunion de stars du cinéma" by Erich Salomon.

Percy Cudlipp recounts their meeting in Maurice Chevalier's Own Story (NASH & GRAYSON LIMITED, 1930):

"ON the bare stage at the Bouffe Parisienne an audition was in progress.

Performers were being picked for a forthcoming revue in which Maurice Chevalier was to be the star.

One by one applicants detached themselves from a waiting group in the wings and danced or sang so that Chevalier and his producers could make their choice.

There was one girl whose dancing particularly impressed the onlookers. She was petite, dark and shy. She danced as if she did so for enjoyment rather than for a living.

As the sharp tinkle of the piano died away one of the producers announced, "Madamoiselle is engaged," and shortly afterwards the girl whose name was Yvonne Vallee heard that she was to have a dance in the revue as partner to Chevalier himself."

A romance ensued, "In the next season Mile. Vallee joined me as my regular dancing partner. Meanwhile, we had become something more than good comrades. We found that we had fallen in love." Maurice Chevalier proposed in 1926; they intended to have a quiet wedding but the wedding's location had been leaked to the paparazzi.

Vallée frequently performed alongside her husband, playing the café proprietor's daughter (the love interest of her husband's character) in Le Petit Cafe, in the musical "Playboy of Paris", directed by Ludwig Berger and singing in duo with him on the recording "Dit's moi M'sieur Chevalier".

The marriage lasted eight years, and they were divorced on grounds of incompatibility. Maurice Chevalier took up with dancer Nita Raya shortly after.

== Filmography ==
- Hello New York (1928)
- The Little Cafe (1931)
