= Victor Roger =

French composer

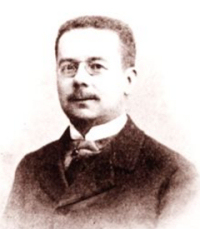

Victor Roger (22 July 1853 – 2 December 1903) was a French composer. He is best known for his operettas, particularly the lighter kind known as the "vaudeville-opérette". His thirty theatre works, composed between 1880 and 1902, also include pantomimes and ballets. His best-known piece, Les vingt-huit jours de Clairette, has remained in the repertory of French companies.

== Biography ==
Roger was born in Montpellier, in the south of France, the son of a musician. After studying at the École Niedermeyer he began his career composing songs and operettas for the Eldorado music hall. In 1886, he had a success with Joséphine vendue par ses soeurs, a parody of Méhul's biblical opera, Joseph et ses frères. He followed this with Les vingt-huit jours de Clairette (1892), an operetta on a military theme, in the tradition of the earlier operetta composer Hervé. It ran initially for 236 performances and was revived in 1900, 1901, 1903, 1908, 1914, 1920, 1921 and 1925, and was filmed in 1933.

Les vingt-huit jours de Clairette was by far Roger's greatest success, and so it has tended to eclipse his other works, some of which enjoyed considerable popularity initially. L'auberge du Tohu-Bohu, which followed in 1897, was another example of "vaudeville-opérette", in which the spoken comedy took a more equal part with the music than in traditional operetta. Besides his songs and operettas, Roger's compositions included some ballet and pantomimes, the former being Le vague (1883), La Camargo (1901), and Cendrillon (1902), and the latter were Balazi-Boumboum (1888) and Chez le conturier (1895). He collaborated with the composers Gaston Serpette (Cendrillonnette (1890) and La Dot de Brigitte (1895)) and Paul Lacome (Mademoiselle Asmodée (1891)). The critic Andrew Lamb wrote of Roger, "His music is admirably crafted, demonstrating melodic grace, charm and a flair for rhythmic effect that are well suited to the lighthearted stage works to which he contributed."

Roger was a Chevalier of the Légion d'Honneur, a critic for the publication La France, and editor of the theatrical news in the Petit journal. He also acted as secretary of the Paris Opéra balls.

Roger died in Paris at the age of 50.
