= The Speckled Band =

The Speckled Band may refer to:

- "The Adventure of the Speckled Band", one of the 56 short Sherlock Holmes stories written by author Sir Arthur Conan Doyle
- The Speckled Band (1923 film), a silent film starring Eille Norwood as Sherlock Holmes
- The Speckled Band (1931 film), a film starring Raymond Massey as Sherlock Holmes
- The Speckled Band, a 1949 television adaptation for an episode of Your Show Time
- The Speckled Band (play), a 1910 stage play adapted by Arthur Conan Doyle from his own short story
