= Quadrille (disambiguation) =

Quadrille is a dance.

Quadrille may also refer to:

- Quadrille (card game), a trick-taking card game
- Quadrille (patience), a patience or solitaire game of the 'simple builder' type
- Quadrille (dressage), a choreographed dressage ride
- Quadrille (play), a 1952 play by Noël Coward
- Square tiling in geometry
- Quadrille (1938 film), a French film directed by Sacha Guitry
- Quadrille (1997 film), a film by Valérie Lemercier

== See also ==
- "Lobster-quadrille", a song in the Lewis Carroll novel Alice in Wonderland
- "Lobster Quadrille", an episode of The Avengers
- Quadrille paper, a type of graph paper
- Quadrille, a British publisher owned by Penguin Random House
