= A Woman of No Importance (disambiguation) =

A Woman of No Importance is an 1893 play by Oscar Wilde.

A Woman of No Importance may also refer to:

- A Woman of No Importance (1921 film), a British drama film, based on the Oscar Wilde play
- A Woman of No Importance (1936 film), a German drama film, based on the Oscar Wilde play
- A Woman of No Importance (1937 film), a French drama film, based on the Oscar Wilde play
- A Woman of No Importance (1945 film), an Argentine comedy drama film, based on the Oscar Wilde play
- A Woman of No Importance, a 1982 play by Alan Bennett, the basis of his TV series Talking Heads
- "A Woman of No Importance" (Doctors), a 2004 television episode
- A Woman of No Importance, a 2019 book by Sonia Purnell

== See also ==
- A Man of No Importance (disambiguation)
