= My Father Was Right =

1936 film

- Directed by: Sacha Guitry
- Written by: Sacha Guitry
- Based on: My Father Was Right by Sacha Guitry
- Produced by: Serge Sandberg
- Starring: Sacha Guitry; Betty Daussmond; Paul Bernard; Serge Grave
- Cinematography: Georges Benoît
- Edited by: Myriam Borsoutsky
- Music by: Adolphe Borchard
- Production company: Cinéas
- Distributed by: Films Sonores Tobis
- Release date: 27 November 1936
- Running time: 94 minutes
- Country: France
- Language: French

My Father Was Right (French: Mon père avait raison...) is a 1936 French romantic comedy film directed by Sacha Guitry and starring Guitry, Betty Daussmond, Paul Bernard, Serge Grave and Gaston Dubosc. It is an adaptation of the 1919 play of the same title by Guitry.

It was shot at the Epinay Studios in Paris.

== Cast ==
- Sacha Guitry as Charles Bellanger
- Betty Daussmond as Germaine Bellanger, son épouse
- Paul Bernard as Maurice Bellanger, leur fils adulte
- Serge Grave as Maurice Bellanger, enfant
- Gaston Dubosc as Adolphe Bellanger, père de Charles
- Jacqueline Delubac as Loulou, amie de Maurice
- Marcel Lévesque as le docteur Mourier
- Pauline Carton as Marie Ganion, domestique des Bellanger
- Robert Seller as Émile Perducau, domestique des Bellanger

== Bibliography ==
- Dayna Oscherwitz & MaryEllen Higgins. The A to Z of French Cinema. Scarecrow Press, 2009.
