= Nguyễn Văn Quỳ =

Vietnamese composer and musician (1925–2022)

- Born: Nguyễn Văn Quỳ; 2 January 1925; Hanoi, Vietnam
- Died: 27 January 2022 (aged 97)
- Genres: classical, romanticism
- Occupation(s): Composer, music teacher
- Website: facebook.com/Nguyen-Van-Quy-237847186263373

Nguyen Van Quy (2 January 1925 – 27 January 2022) was a Vietnamese composer and musician. He started as composer under the artist name Đỗ Quyên, and was later given the nicknames "Quỳ Sonate" and "Vietnamese Beethoven". He is known for having written nine sonatas for violin and piano, but also for several songs. He was a member of the French music copyright association (Société des auteurs, compositeurs et éditeurs de musique: SACEM).

== Biography ==
Nguyen Van Quy was born in Hanoi and has revealed musical talent since childhood. His melodies are inspired by Vietnamese traditional music as well as French Romanticism. Nguyen Van Quy graduated from the French Ecole Universelle music course by mail correspondence in 1954. He was the student of the French composer and pianist Adolphe Borchard. He had once worked with Tử Phác.

After the Geneva Agreements, he remained music teacher at Hanoi National University of Education (Trường Đại học Sư Phạm Hà Nội) from 1956 to 1978. He has completed nine sonatas for violin and piano and many songs. He had continuous links with French musical circles where he was known as the "Vietnamese Beethoven". He was awarded the second prize of the Vietnam Musician Association for the Sonata No. 4 (1995) and the Sonata No. 8 (2005). In 2009, he was awarded the Cultural Heritage Patrimoenia Award at the Swiss embassy in Hanoi.

Van Quy latterly lived with his family in Hanoi. He was married to Do Thi Nam Kim (a French teacher for physicians and pharmacists) and had one son. He died on 27 January 2022, at the age of 97.

== Works ==
Here is the list of his musical works according to a biography written in 2011.

- Sonatas
  - Sonata No.1 for Violin and Piano, completed in 1964
  - Sonata No.2 for Violin and Piano, completed in 1976
  - Sonata No.3 for Violin and Piano, completed in 1979
  - Sonata No.4 for Violin and Piano, completed in 1982
  - Sonata No.5 for Violin and Piano, completed in 1984
  - Sonata No.6 for Violin and Piano, completed in 1985
  - Sonata No.7 for Violin and Piano, completed in 1998
  - Sonata No.8 for Violin and Piano, completed in 2000
  - Sonata No.9 for Violin and Piano, completed in 2003
- Songs
  - Bóng chiều (Evening shadow)
  - Chiều cô thôn (Village at dusk)
  - Dạ khúc (Nocturne)
  - Mây trôi
  - Nhớ trăng huyền xưa
  - Yêu người bao nhiêu yêu nghề bấy nhiêu
  - Bác Hồ vầng dương của chúng ta
  - Đoàn kết giữ hòa bình
  - Ngọn triều lên
