= Fric-Frac =

1939 film

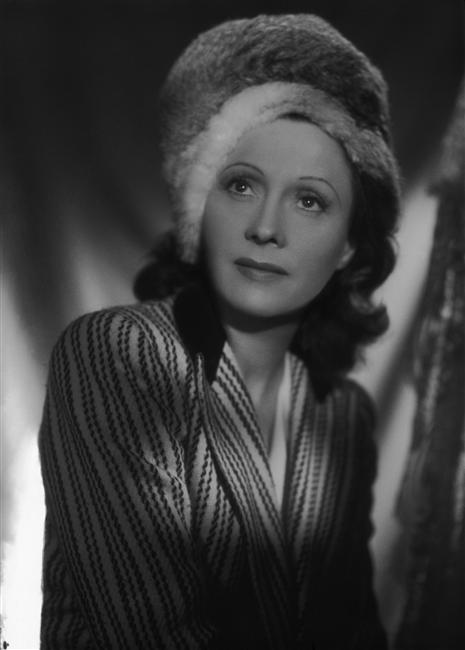
- Directed by: Maurice Lehmann; Claude Autant-Lara (uncredited)
- Screenplay by: Michel Duran
- Based on: Fric-frac by Édouard Bourdet
- Produced by: Maurice Lehmann
- Starring: Fernandel; Arletty; Michel Simon
- Cinematography: Louis Née; Armand Thirard
- Edited by: Victoria Mercanton
- Music by: Casimir Oberfeld
- Release date: 15 June 1939
- Running time: 120 minutes
- Country: France
- Language: French

Fric-Frac is a 1939 French comedy film directed by Maurice Lehmann and Claude Autant-Lara and starring Fernandel, Arletty and Michel Simon. It tells the story of Marcel, an assistant to a jeweller, who befriends a couple of criminals who want to use him as an accomplice to rob his boss. The film is based on a 1936 play by Édouard Bourdet. Filming took place in March and April 1939 at the Laboratoires et Studios Eclair in Épinay-sur-Seine. The film was released in France on 15 June 1939.

== Cast ==
- Fernandel as Marcel
- Arletty as Loulou
- Michel Simon as Jo
- Hélène Robert as Renée
- Marcel Vallée as Mercadier, the jeweller
- Jacques Varennes as Tintin
- Andrex as Petit Louis
- René Génin as Blin
- Georges Lannes as Fernand
- Génia Vaury as La Grande Marie

== Production ==
According to Arletty, Claude Autant-Lara did all the direction and Maurice Lehmann was mainly the producer.
