= Good Luck (1935 film) =

1935 film

- Directed by: Sacha Guitry; Fernand Rivers
- Written by: Sacha Guitry
- Produced by: Maurice Lehmann; Fernand Rivers
- Starring: Sacha Guitry; Jacqueline Delubac; Pauline Carton
- Cinematography: Jean Bachelet
- Edited by: Pierre Schwab
- Music by: Vincent Scotto
- Production companies: Productions Maurice Lehmann; Les Films Fernand Rivers
- Distributed by: Les Grandes Exclusivités Européennes
- Release date: 20 September 1935
- Running time: 78 minutes
- Country: France
- Language: French

Good Luck (French: Bonne chance!) is a 1935 French romantic comedy film directed by Sacha Guitry and Fernand Rivers and starring Guitry, Jacqueline Delubac and Pauline Carton. In it a woman becomes convinced a man she has met is a good luck charm after she wins a lottery.

It was shot at the Billancourt Studios and on location in Paris and Monaco. The film's sets were designed by the art director Robert Gys.

In 1940 it was remade as an American film Lucky Partners starring Ronald Colman and Ginger Rogers.

== Cast ==
- Sacha Guitry as Claude
- Jacqueline Delubac as Marie
- Pauline Carton as La mère de Marie
- Paul Dullac as Le maire de Marie
- Montel as Un vieux monsieur qui passe
- André Numès Fils as Prosper
- Rivers Cadet as Le greffier
- Robert Darthez as Gastion Lepeltier
- Andrée Guize as Henriette Lepeltier
- Lucienne Givry as L'élégante
- Simone Sandre as L'épicière
- Madeleine Suffel as La gantière
- Antoine as Antoine, le coiffeur
- Louis Baldy as L'employé de banque
- Renée Dennsy as Une radeuse
- Gustave Huberdeau
- Régine Paris
- Robert Seller as Le maître d'hôtel
- Louis Vonelly as Le marchand de tableaux

== Critical reception ==
Writing for The Spectator in 1936, Graham Greene gave the film a good review, describing it as "a charming silly film in the Clair genre, a lyrical absurdity". Greene notes that it is only cinema and music that can produce such uplifting transience and joy.

== Bibliography ==
- Dayna Oscherwitz & MaryEllen Higgins. The A to Z of French Cinema. Scarecrow Press, 2009.
