= Gaston Dubosc =

French actor (1861–1941)

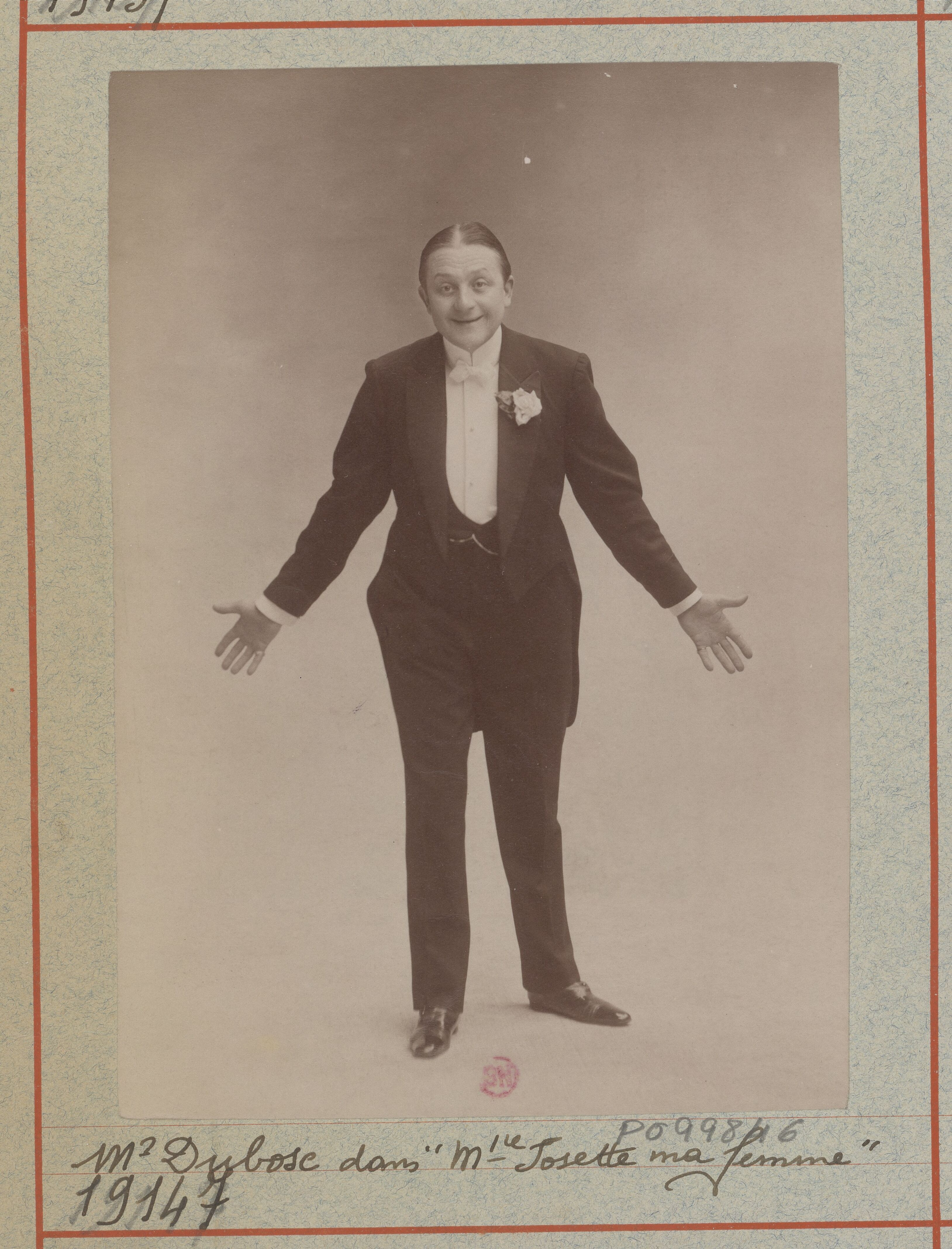
- Gaston Dubosc in Mademoiselle Josette, ma femme (1906)
- Born: 9 August 1861; Paris, France
- Died: 28 June 1941 (aged 79); Paris, France
- Other name: Gaston Anatole Dubosc
- Occupation: Actor
- Years active: 1911-1940 (film)

Gaston Dubosc (1861–1941) was a French stage and film actor.

== Selected filmography ==
- Le voleur (1915) - Raymond Lagardes
- L'épervier (1925) - Maurice de Sardloup
- Son premier film (1926) - Le grand-père
- A Son from America (1932) - M. Berterin
- Dainah the Mulatto (1932) - Le commandant
- A Gentleman of the Ring (1932) - Le comte Brodelet de Surville
- Mater Dolorosa (1933)
- Once Upon a Time (1933) - Parker
- The Red Robe (1933) - Le Bouzule
- A Day Will Come (1934)
- L'aristo (1934)
- Minuit, place Pigalle (1934)
- N'aimer que toi (1934) - Le chanteur des rues
- The Secret of Woronzeff (1934) - L'oncle Ivan
- The Devil in the Bottle (1935) - Le comte
- Pasteur (1935) - Le président de l'Acadèmie
- Adémaï in the Middle Ages (1935)
- Gaspard de Besse (1935) - Maître Bouis
- Royal Waltz (1936) - (uncredited)
- The Secret of Polichinelle (1936)
- Le Roman d'un jeune homme pauvre (1936) - Alain - le vieux domestique
- The King (1936) - L'évêque
- My Father Was Right (1936) - Adolphe Bellanger, son père
- Beethoven's Great Love (1937) - Anton Schindler
- The Pearls of the Crown (1937) - Le grand-duc
- The New Rich (1938)
- Remontons les Champs-Élysées (1938) - L'abbé Maudoux
- Deputy Eusèbe (1939) - Le notaire
- Nine Bachelors (1939) - Antonin Rousselier
- Sarajevo (1940) - Le comte Chotek (final film role)

== Bibliography ==
- Goble, Alan. The Complete Index to Literary Sources in Film. Walter de Gruyter, 1999.
