= Adolphe Borchard =

French pianist and composer

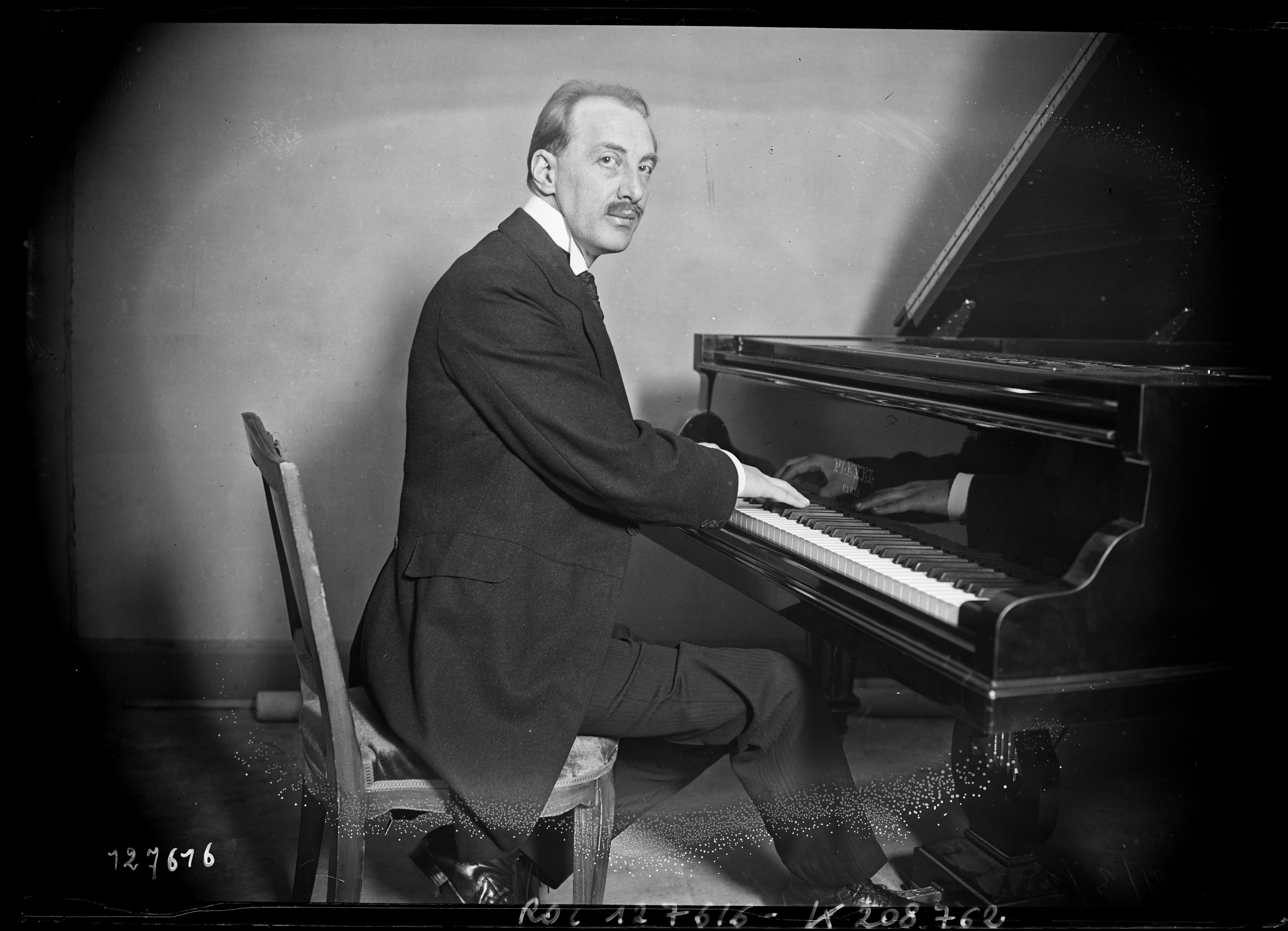
- Adolphe Brochard playing piano
- Born: 30 June 1882; Le Havre, France
- Died: 13 December 1967 (aged 85); Paris, France
- Occupations: Composer, Pianist
- Years active: 1931 - 1943 (film scores)
- Family: unmarried

Adolphe Borchard (1882–1967) was a French pianist and composer who worked on a number of film scores during the 1930s and 1940s including large-budget films such as Ultimatum (1938). IMDb credits at least 19 films. He has several music students. The Vietnamese composer Nguyễn Văn Quỳ is one of them and studied through distance education between 1953 and 1954.

Borchard can be seen playing the piano in the first scene of Sacha Guitry's Confessions of a Cheat (1936) (French title: Le Roman d'un Tricheur), where he is introduced by the narrator. He also appeared in the same director's Quadrille two years later.

== Selected filmography ==
- A Dog That Pays Off (1932)
- A Telephone Call (1932)
- The Red Robe (1933)
- The Invisible Woman (1933)
- Prince Jean (1934)
- Confessions of a Cheat (1936)
- Désiré (1937)
- Quadrille (1938)
- Ultimatum (1938)
- White Nights in Saint Petersburg (1938)
- Nine Bachelors (1939)
- Tornavara (1943)
- Jeannou (1943)

== Bibliography ==
- Jung, Uli & Schatzberg, Walter. Beyond Caligari: The Films of Robert Wiene. Berghahn Books, 1999.
- Nichols, Roger. The Harlequin Years: Music in Paris, 1917 - 1929. University of California Press, 2002.
