= The Pearls of the Crown =

1937 film by Christian-Jaque, Sacha Guitry

- Directed by: Sacha Guitry; Christian-Jaque
- Written by: Sacha Guitry; Christian-Jaque
- Produced by: Serge Sandberg
- Starring: Jacqueline Delubac; Sacha Guitry; Lyn Harding; Renée Saint-Cyr
- Cinematography: Jules Kruger
- Edited by: Myriam Borsoutsky; William Barache
- Music by: Jean Françaix
- Production companies: Cinéas; Impérial Film
- Distributed by: Films Sonores Tobis
- Release date: 12 May 1937
- Running time: 118 minutes
- Country: France
- Languages: French; English; Italian

The Pearls of the Crown (French: Les Perles de la couronne) is a 1937 French comedy film of historically based fiction by Sacha Guitry who plays four roles in it (many of the other performers play multiple roles, as well). Guitry's Jean Martin investigates the history of seven pearls, four of which end up on the crown of England, while the other three initially go missing.

It was made at the Billancourt Studios in Paris with location shooting at a variety of sites including the Abbaye de Royaumont, the Château de Louveciennes and aboard the S.S. Normandie. The film's sets were designed by the art director Jean Perrier.

== Plot ==
Tracing the history of seven valuable pearls of the English Crown from the time of Henry VIII of England to the present day (1937). Writer Jean Martin (Sacha Guitry) attempts to track down three of the missing pearls by tracing their previous owners, with events seen in flashback, involving Napoleon, King Henry VIII and Elizabeth I of England amongst others.

== Cast ==
- Sacha Guitry as Jean Martin/François I/Viscount Barras/Old Napoleon III
- Jacqueline Delubac as Françoise Martin/Mary, Queen of Scots/Josephine
- Lyn Harding as John Russell/Henry VIII
- Renée Saint-Cyr as Madeleine de la Tour d'Auvergne
- Enrico Glori as Pope's Chamberlain
- Ermete Zacconi as Pope Clement VII
- Barbara Shaw as Anne Boleyn
- Marguerite Moreno as Catherine de'Medici/Empress Eugenie
- Arletty as Queen of Abyssinia
- Marcel Dalio as Abyssinian Minister/Jewel Seller
- Claude Dauphin as Italian in Abyssinia
- Robert Seller as Englishman in Abyssinia
- Ponzio as Singing worker
- Andrews Engelmann as The Lead Robber
- Yvette Pienne as Queen Mary I of England (Mary Tudor)/Queen Elizabeth I/Queen Victoria
- Raimu as Industrialist
- Lisette Lanvin as Femme du monde/Reine Victoria
- Pierre Juvenet as The Expert
- Henri Crémieux as Auctioneer
- Aimé Simon-Girard as Henri IV
- Germaine Aussey as Gabrielle d'Estrées
- Simone Renant as Madame Du Barry
- Damia as Woman of the People
- Di Mazzei as Sans-coulotte
- Jean-Louis Barrault as Lorenzo de Medicia/Young Bonaparte
- Robert Pizani as Talleyrand
- Émile Drain as Napoleon I (1815)
- Huguette Duflos as Queen Hortense
- Raymonde Allain as Empress Eugenie (1865)
- Violet Farebrother as An Old Lady
- Rosine Deréan as Young girl/Catherine d'Aragon
- Marie Leconte as A Woman in Misery
- Pierre Magnier as An Old Lord
- Cécile Sorel as A Courtesan (5th billed in star credit!)
- Lillie Grandval as Opera Soprano
- Jean Coquelin as An Old man
- Gaston Dubosc as A Grand Duke
- Pauline Carton as Femme du Chambre
- Anaclara as La négresse
- Colette Borelli as Mary Stuart (girl)
- Julien Clément as Le gigolo
- Marfa d'Hervilly as La vieille courtisane
- Denis de Marney as Darnley
- Aline Debray
- Dynalik as Le petit rat
- Georges Fels as ?
- Eugénie Fougère as La vieille coquette
- Gary Garland as Une passagère sur le Normandie
- Anthony Gildès as Le vieil hongrois
- Georges Grey as Le jeune hongrois
- Geneviève Guitry as ?
- Lautner as Le Titien
- Oléo as La petite poule
- Jacqueline Pacaud as Jane Seymour
- Annie Rozanne as ?
- Léon Walther as Anne de Montmorency
- Laurence Atkins as Madame Tallien/Madame d'Estampes
- Jacques Berlioz as ?
- ? as Hipollite
- Humberto Catalano as Spanelli (uncredited!)
- James Craven as Hans Holbein
- Derrick De Marney as Darnley
- Fred Duprez as An American
- Romuald Joubé as Clouet
- Darling Légitimus as ?
- Percy Marmont as Cardinal Wolsey
- Paulette Élambert as Catherine de Medici (girl)

== Critical reception ==
Writing for Night and Day in 1937, Graham Greene gave the film a good review claiming that it "entertained me even more than it irritated me". Admitting some degree of distaste in director Guitry's general style and demeanor, Greene found admiration in Guitry's "ingenious[] attempts to give a wider circulation to a French picture by working the story out in three languages" and described his use of language in certain scenes as "cunningly and quite naturally arranged". Greene praised the story and the acting of Guitry and Delubac.

TV Guide gave the film three out of four stars, writing, "Although Guitry chose to push the audience's patience a bit by filming the story in three languages, PEARLS OF THE CROWN is one of his finest works, and perhaps his least theatrical. (In French, Italian, and English; English subtitles)."
