= Victorine Studios =

Film studios located in Nice

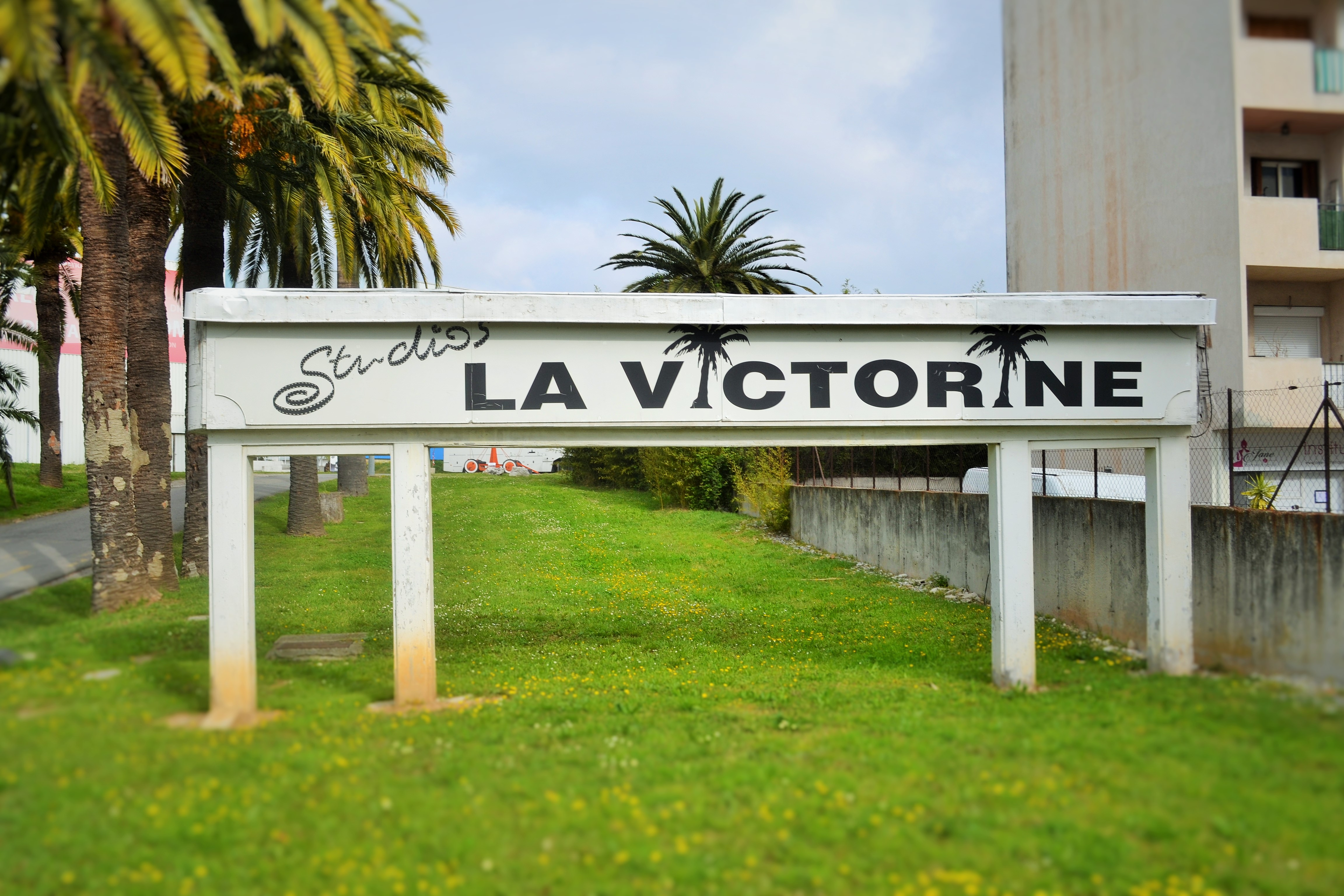
The Entrance to the Studios.

Victorine Studios (French: Studios de la Victorine) are a film studio in the French city of Nice. They are also known as the Nice Studios. Several small studios have also existed in the city.

Originally built in 1921 in an attempt to create a Hollywood-style studio on the French Riviera, the major figures behind the new venture were the producers Louis Nalpas and Serge Sandberg. Initially constructed in the early glasshouse style, the facility was soon converted into a more modern electrified design. It had seven sound stages. They worked in parallel with the other main French studios which were clustered in Paris. A key figure in the development of the Victorine was the producer Louis Nalpas. A second studio complex was located in Nice, Saint-Laurent-du-Var Studios which existed from 1920 to 1944.

During the Second World War, the studios took on greater importance. Following the defeat of France, half of the country was occupied by Germany including the capital at Paris. Nice was located in the southern zone of Vichy France. Many technicians and actors fled south to avoid the Nazis, and found work in productions at the Victorine.

Immediately after the war, the studios resumed their subordinate role to Paris and production there was irregular.

For a while (2000–2017), they were managed by a private company and were renamed "Studios Riviera" but the city decided to repurchase them in November 2017 and restored their original name.

On November 22, 2017, at the end of the public service delegation, the city of Nice took over the management of the studios23, which returned to their original name "les studios de la Victorine".

== Bibliography ==
- Crisp, C.G. The Classic French Cinema, 1930-1960. Indiana University Press, 1993.
