= Pauline Carton =

French actress (1884–1974)

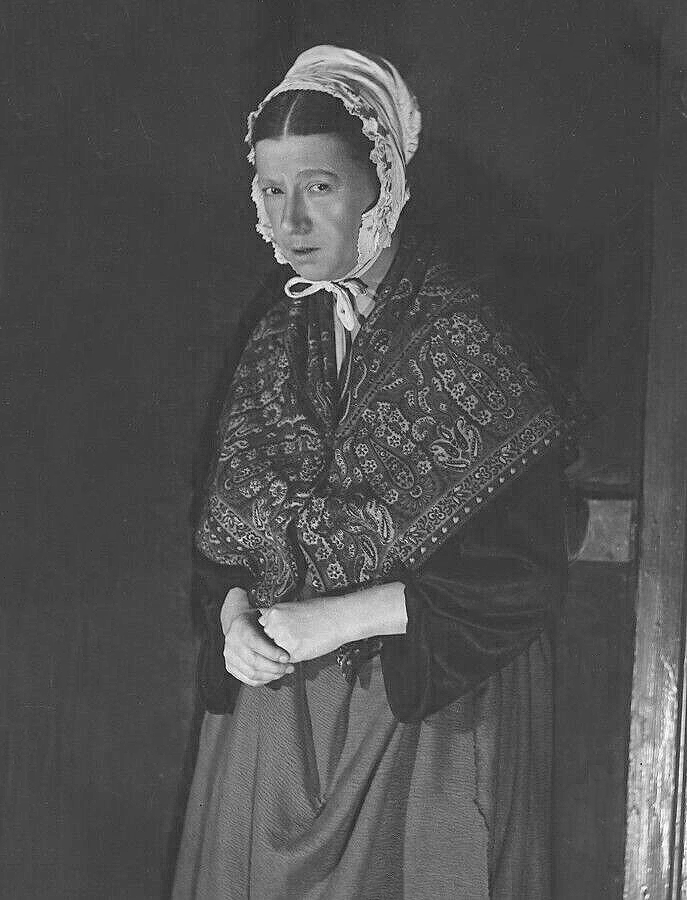
- Pauline Carton in 1934
- Born: 4 July 1884; Biarritz, France
- Died: 17 June 1974 (aged 89); Paris, France
- Occupation: Actress
- Years active: 1907–1974

Pauline Carton (French pronunciation: [polin kaʁtɔ̃]; 4 July 1884 – 17 June 1974) was a French film actress. She appeared in more than 190 films between 1907 and 1974.

== Filmography ==
- La fille du Boche (1915)
- Blanchette (1921)
- La femme de nulle part (1922)
- Château historique (1923) – Tante Chloë
- My Priest Among the Rich (1925)
- Feu Mathias Pascal (1926) – Tante Scholastique
- Le p'tit Parigot (1926) – Tante Prudence
- La tournée Farigoule (1926) – La poétesse
- La petite fonctionnaire (1927) – Madame Lebardin
- Education of a Prince (1927) – La concierge
- La ronde infernale (1928)
- Yvette (1928)
- Miss Édith, duchesse (1929) – Marie
- L'arpète (1929) – La concierge
- My Childish Father (1930) – The Concierge
- Cendrillon de Paris (1930)
- Black and White (1931) – Marie – la bonne
- Montmartre (1931)
- The Voice of Happiness (1931)
- American Love (1931) – Pauline
- The Blood of a Poet (1932)
- Seul (1932) – Mme Frutte
- My Priest Among the Rich (1932) – La bonne
- That Scoundrel Morin – Madame Morin
- Suzanne (1932) – Mme Batonné
- Criminal (1933)
- Âme de clown (1933)
- The Abbot Constantine (1933) – Pauline
- High and Low (1933) – Madame Poschbeim, la couturière
- Bouton d'or (1933)
- Nous ne sommes plus des enfants (1934)
- Les misérables (1934) – La soeur de Gillenormand (uncredited)
- Miquette (1934) – Mlle Poche
- Ces messieurs de la santé (1934) – Mme Génissier
- Little Jacques (1934) – Mademoiselle Julie
- Les hommes de la côte (1934)
- Itto (1934) – Tante Anna
- Ferdinand the Roisterer (1935) – Mme Paturin
- Wedding Night (1935)
- Good Luck (1935) – La mère de Marie
- L'école des cocottes (1935) – Mme Bernoux
- Mademoiselle Mozart (1935) – Annette
- The New Testament (1936) – Mademoiselle Morot
- Le roman d'un jeune homme pauvre (1936) – Mademoiselle Aubry, la parente pauvre
- Taras Bulba (1936) – La gouvernante
- Excursion Train (1936) – La concierge
- Confessions of a Cheat (1936) – Mme. Morlot / The Notary's Wife
- Forty Little Mothers (1936) – Mlle Clotilde
- My Father Was Right (1936) – Marie Ganion – sa servante
- You Are Me (1936) – Honorine Guibert – la tante de Bobby
- Southern Mail (1937) – Mathilde
- The House Opposite (1937) – Aglaé
- Vous n'avez rien à déclarer? (1937) – Angèle
- Les dégourdis de la 11ème (1937) – Hortensia
- The Pearls of the Crown (1937) – Une femme de chambre
- Boissière (1937) – Estelle
- The Citadel of Silence (1937) – La logeuse
- The Beauty of Montparnasse (1937) – Madame Pontbichot
- Mon deputé et sa femme (1937)
- Gribouille (1937) – L'autre Nathalie Roguin
- Madelon's Daughter (1937) – La marquise de Sérignan
- The Dark Angels (1937) – La servante
- In Venice, One Night (1937) – La concierge
- Désiré (1937) – Adèle Vazavoir, la cuisinière
- Nights of Princes (1938) – Mademoiselle Mesureux
- Quadrille (1938) – La femme de chambre de l'hôtel
- Monsieur Breloque Has Disappeared (1938)
- Les gaietés de l'exposition (1938) – La logeuse
- Le plus beau gosse de France (1938) – La crémière
- La présidente (1938) – (uncredited)
- Troubled Heart (1938) – Madame Morin
- Un fichu métier (1938) – Adrienne
- Peace on the Rhine (1938) – Anna, la vieille servante
- La marraine du régiment (1938)
- Remontons les Champs-Élysées (1938) – (uncredited)
- Conflict (1938) – Pauline
- Mon oncle et mon curé (1939) – Hortense
- Louise (1939) – La première
- The World Will Shake (1939) – (uncredited)
- La belle revanche (1939) – Mme Bouchot
- Gardons notre sourire (1939) – Florence
- Vous seule que j'aime (1939) – Sidonie Dupont, la directrice du pensionnat
- My Aunt the Dictator (1939) – Eugénie – la bonne
- L'étrange nuit de Noël (1939) – Anna
- Nine Bachelors (1939) – Clémentine
- There's No Tomorrow (1939) – La bonne Ernestine
- Narcisse (1940) – (uncredited)
- Sur le plancher des vaches (1940) – Madame Noblesse, la femme de ménage
- Tobias Is an Angel (1940)
- La prière aux étoiles (1941) – Fernande Richaud – la mère de Florence
- The Lover of Borneo (1942) – Agathe
- The Snow on the Footsteps (1942) – La directrice de la pension de famille
- Six petites filles en blanc (1942)
- The Beautiful Adventure (1942) – Jeantine
- Manouche (1942)
- Marie-Louise (1944) – Frau Gilles / Mrs. Gilles
- La troisième dalle (1946) – Madame Barbaroux
- The Lovers of Pont Saint Jean (1947) – Tante Marguerite
- Third at Heart (1947) – Marguerite
- The Private Life of an Actor (1948) – Elise Belanger
- White as Snow (1948) – Madame Potinel
- The Shadow (1948) – La concierge
- The Lame Devil (1948) – La chiromancienne
- The Cupboard Was Bare (1948) – Mme Ovide
- Marlene (1949) – La vieille dame
- I Like Only You (1949) – Aurélie
- Two Doves (1949) – Angèle – la servante
- Barry (1949) – La mère Culoz
- Ronde de nuit (1949) – La concierge
- Branquignol (1949) – L'astiqueuse de cloches
- Amédée (1950) – Tante Eugénie
- Death Threat (1950) – Madame Auguste
- Le 84 prend des vacances (1950) – Pauline
- Miquette (1950) – Perrine
- Minne, l'ingénue libertine (1950) – (uncredited)
- Le tampon du capiston (1950) – Hortense Reverchon
- Blonde (1950) – La concierge de Claire
- The Treasure of Cantenac (1950) – Eulalie
- The Prize (1950) – Virginie
- Coeur-sur-Mer (1950) – Apolline Meunier
- The Real Culprit (1951) – La concierge
- Come Down, Someone Wants You (1951) – Ursule, la bonne
- La Poison (1951) – La mercière
- My Wife Is Formidable (1951) – La concierge
- Au fil des ondes (1951) – Herself
- Je l'ai été trois fois (1952) – Mme. Dutiquesnois, Renneval's assistant
- Monsieur Taxi (1952) – Mathilde – la tante de Lily
- The Girl with the Whip (1952) – La bonne
- The Virtuous Scoundrel (1953) – La patronne de l'hôtel
- The Drunkard (1953) – Mademoisellle Michel – La Punaise
- Carnival (1953) – Toinette
- Soyez les bienvenus (1953) – Mademoiselle Lulu
- The Porter from Maxim's (1953) – Sophie
- Royal Affairs in Versailles (1954) – La Voisin
- Les deux font la paire (1954) – La concierge
- Fruits of Summer (1955) – Mélanie
- Napoléon (1955) – Une aubergiste
- Pas de souris dans le business (1955) – La concierge
- On déménage le colonel (1955) – La femme du brigadier
- Si Paris nous était conté (1956) – La bouquiniste
- My Priest Among the Poor (1956) – Valérie
- Meeting in Paris (1956) – La salutiste (uncredited)
- Ces sacrées vacances (1956) – La propriétaire
- Les insoumises (1956) – Hortense, la bonne
- Les carottes sont cuites (1956)
- Zaza (1956) – Mme. Anaïs
- Lovers and Thieves (1956) – La refoulée
- Baratin (1956) – Blondine
- The Singer from Mexico (1956) – La tante de Cri-Cri
- Ah, quelle équipe! (1957) – La première voisine
- Les 3 font la paire (1957) – Eveline
- Let's Be Daring, Madame (1957) – La chef des choristes
- Fric-frac en dentelles (1957) – Madame Latouche
- Les gaités de l'escadrille (1958) – La bonne du denstiste
- A Dog, a Mouse, and a Sputnik (1958) – Marie
- En bordée (1958) – L'hôtelière
- Life Together (1958) – Madame Vattier
- Vice Squad (1959) – La 'marieuse'
- The Bureaucrats (1959) – Ida Médard âgée (uncredited)
- Vous n'avez rien à déclarer? (1959) – La servante
- Business (1960) – Clotilde
- Interpol Against X (1960) – Louise Belloy
- La fille du torrent (1961) – La bonne
- The Longest Day (1962) – Maid
- Black Humor (1965) – La Rapet – segment 1 'La Bestiole'
- Clodo (1971) – La concierge
