= Désiré (1937 film) =

1937 film

- Directed by: Sacha Guitry
- Written by: Sacha Guitry (play)
- Produced by: Serge Sandberg
- Starring: Sacha Guitry; Jacqueline Delubac; Jacques Baumer; Arletty
- Cinematography: Jean Bachelet
- Edited by: Myriam Borsoutsky
- Music by: Adolphe Borchard
- Production company: Cineas
- Distributed by: Films Sonores Tobis
- Release date: 3 December 1937
- Running time: 92 minutes
- Country: France
- Language: French

Désiré is a 1937 French comedy film directed by Sacha Guitry and starring Guitry, Jacqueline Delubac, Jacques Baumer and Arletty.

== Synopsis ==
Odette, an actress and the mistress of a government minister, hires a stylish new valet Désiré. Before long this provokes the jealously of her lover, when she begins dreaming aloud about her valet.

== Cast ==
- Sacha Guitry as Désiré Tronchais, valet de chambre
- Jacqueline Delubac as Odette Cléry
- Jacques Baumer as Felix Montignac
- Saturnin Fabre as Adrien Corniche
- Alys Delonce as Henriette Corniche, femme d'Adrien
- Arletty as Madeleine Crapicheau, la femme de chambre
- Pauline Carton as Adèle Vazavoir, la cuisinière
- Geneviève Vix as La comtesse

== Bibliography ==
- Oscherwitz, Dayna & Higgins, MaryEllen. The A to Z of French Cinema. Scarecrow Press, 2009.
