= Lucky Partners =

- Theatrical poster
- Directed by: Lewis Milestone
- Screenplay by: George Haight; Edwin Justus Mayer; Lewis Milestone; Franz Schulz; Allan Scott; John Van Druten
- Story by: Sacha Guitry
- Based on: story "Bonne Chance" by Sacha Guitry
- Produced by: George Haight
- Starring: Ronald Colman; Ginger Rogers; Jack Carson
- Cinematography: Robert De Grasse
- Edited by: Henry Berman
- Music by: Dimitri Tiomkin
- Production company: RKO Radio Pictures
- Distributed by: RKO Radio Pictures
- Release date: August 2, 1940 (Theatrical)
- Running time: 99 minutes
- Country: United States
- Language: English
- Budget: $733,000
- Box office: $1,390,000

Lucky Partners is a 1940 American romantic comedy film starring Ronald Colman and Ginger Rogers. Directed by Lewis Milestone for RKO Radio Pictures, it is based on the 1935 Sacha Guitry film Good Luck. The picture was the only film pairing of Colman and Rogers, and Rogers' eleventh and final film written by Allan Scott.

== Plot ==
Greenwich Village "sidewalk" portrait painter and caricaturist David Grant passes Jean Newton on the street. On a whim he wishes her good luck.

She works in a book shop directly across the street from his small second floor studio. When Jean makes a delivery, a rich woman gifts her a dazzling new gown she never wants to see again because it reminds her of its purchaser.

Believing David to bring her good luck, Jean asks him to go in halves with her on a ticket for a $150,000 sweepstakes horse race. He agrees only on condition that if they win she accompany him on a platonic trip to see the country before she settles down to staid married life in Poughkeepsie, New York. She and her fiancé, insurance salesman Frederick "Freddie" Harper, are dubious about the proposition, but David talks them into it.

When the pair's $2.50 ticket is one of the few that draw a horse, its value shoots up $12,000. Freddie wants to sell it, but the other two decide to try for the jackpot. Their horse does not even place, but Freddie informs Jean that he sold her half for $6000. Outraged at his duplicity, she offers half the money to David. He only accepts if she agrees to keep their bargain.

Their first stop is Niagara Falls. They book rooms as "brother and sister" two floors apart and retire early. However, due to a misunderstanding, the hotel clerk switches Jean's room to one adjoining David's, separated by locking double doors. Freddie, suspicious of David's intentions, secretly follows them there. Even though he finds their doors barred to one another during an attempted ambush, he is not appeased. Pretending to return home, he books himself a room with the intention of springing on them again in the middle of the night. Meanwhile, discovering that Jean finds his room more attractive than hers, David switches rooms with her. As the night passes, David and Jean converse by phone and agree to go dancing in the moonlight.

Everything is very romantic in the outdoor ballroom, one thing leads to another, and they share a kiss. Jean moves closer to David, but David, realizing he is violating the terms of his own proposition, farther away. They retire again, only to have Freddie barge into what he believes to be David's room, find Jean there, then knock down the common door, convinced David is hiding on the other side. Instead, David has checked out and left a note for Jean, which she refuses to share with Freddie.

En route back to New York City, David is stopped by a policeman, and when he admits the car is not his, is taken to jail. Shortly afterwards, the hotel house detective, put on the scent by the apprehending police, accuses Jean of working some sort of racket with David, and brings her and Freddie in on various charges.

They are brought before a judge, and David is forced to admit under oath that he is really Paul Knight Somerset, a celebrated painter who disappeared three years back after being imprisoned for producing what had been deemed indecent illustrations for a book (since regarded as a classic). The court reporters seize upon the story, headlines flash Somerset's discovery and arrest, and the courtroom for their trial is packed with the social elite. Both Jean and David act as their own counsels. While questioning himself on the witness stand, David reveals he is genuinely in love with Jean. Still under oath, Jean is asked by the judge if she is in love with David and is compelled to admit she is. Weighing the evidence of the alleged crimes, the judge fines Freddie $25, clears both David and Jean, and at her request, apologizes to David on behalf of the American judicial system for how he was treated, in the hopes he will resume a productive career in their marriage to come.

== Cast ==
- Ronald Colman as David Grant
- Ginger Rogers as Jean Newton
- Jack Carson as Frederick Harper
- Spring Byington as Aunt Lucy
- Cecilia Loftus as Mrs. Alice Sylvester
- Harry Davenport as Judge
- Leon Belasco as Nick #1
- Eddie Conrad as Nick #2
- Walter Kingsford as Wendell, David's lawyer
- Lucile Gleason as Ethel's Mother
- Helen Lynd as Ethel
- Hugh O'Connell as hotel desk clerk
- Brandon Tynan as Mr. Sylvester

== Production ==
When it became obvious that the then-unknown Jack Carson was intimidated performing opposite Colman and Rogers, director Milestone bolstered his confidence:

"Every time he went into a scene," Milestone related, "I'd say, 'Get in there and pitch. They're no better than you are. Steal that scene.' Finally he got the hang of it. He acquired confidence."

== Reception ==
The film was a big hit with critics, grossed almost double its budget, and earned a $200,000 profit.

Bosley Crowther of The New York Times noted that screen stories, "like wines, are not always good travelers" in that they can suffer when plot and story is adapted from one language and country to another. Lucky Partners, he asserted, "is distinctly not one of those occasions." In furthering his comparison to wine he continued, "RKO's craftsmen have preserved its bouquet intact—and the result is a comedy that is dry and sparkling and bubbles till the last drop." The film "retained the impudent charm and rippling wit of the very Gallic Mr. Guitry", and others reasons for its success are because Allan Scott and John Van Druten treated the script "as neatly as even Mr. Guitry could demand" and that director Lewis Milestone "has punctuated the scenes deftly and never allowed the effervescence to escape in a single explosive laugh".

The Evening Independent noted this was the first screen pairing of Ronald Colman with Ginger Rogers. They wrote "the picture is excellent entertainment despite the rather whimsical plot", and that "Colman does his usual suave job of acting and Ginger Rogers again proves her deft touch for light comedy".

The Los Angeles Times wrote "it's a stroke of showmanship, teaming the vivacious Miss Rogers with the debonair Ronald Colman".

The Age wrote that adapting a Sacha Guitry work could be compared to "doctoring" a play by Noël Coward, but that Lewis Milestone's direction of the adaptation is "entertaining and gives Ginger Rogers scope for her unique talent".

The Lawrence Journal-World wrote that the film "represents a spectacular merger of Ronald Colman and Ginger Rogers",

In an undated review accessed in 2011 Craig Butler of Allmovie felt that a film starring such actors as Ronald Colman and Ginger Rogers ought to have been better, calling it "an innocuous but hardly memorable little time filler". He charged that the film had a "ridiculous premise" that "in the right, deft hands could turn into charming, captivating trifle", but was let down by the director and the writers. He asserted that the writers did not seem to agree on what sort of story to tell, and that as a result "the film switches gears rather too often and its parts don't fit together." He felt that "Colman and Rogers don't have a great deal of chemistry, but they have panache and know-how to spare, and Carson, along with reliable Spring Byington, make the most of what they have."
