= Sleeping Partners =

1930 film

- Directed by: Seymour Hicks
- Written by: Seymour Hicks
- Based on: Let's Make a Dream by Sacha Guitry
- Produced by: Sasha Geneen; Maurice J. Wilson
- Starring: Seymour Hicks; Edna Best; Lyn Harding
- Cinematography: Karl Freund
- Edited by: Edward Jonsenn
- Production company: Sageen
- Distributed by: Paramount British Pictures
- Release date: 18 March 1930
- Running time: 71 minutes
- Country: United Kingdom
- Language: English

Sleeping Partners is a 1930 British comedy film directed by Seymour Hicks and starring Hicks, Edna Best and Lyn Harding. It is based on the 1916 play Let's Make a Dream by Sacha Guitry. It was shot at Islington Studios.

== Cast ==
- Seymour Hicks as He
- Edna Best as She
- Lyn Harding as It
- Herbert Waring as Emile
- Marguerite Allan as Elise
- David Paget as Virtuoso

== Bibliography ==
- Low, Rachael. Filmmaking in 1930s Britain. George Allen & Unwin, 1985.
- Wood, Linda. British Films, 1927-1939. British Film Institute, 1986.
