= Let's Make a Dream =

1936 film

- Poster
- Directed by: Sacha Guitry
- Written by: Sacha Guitry
- Based on: Let's Make a Dream by Sacha Guitry
- Produced by: Serge Sandberg
- Starring: Sacha Guitry; Raimu; Jacqueline Delubac; Arletty
- Cinematography: Georges Benoît
- Edited by: Myriam Borsoutsky
- Music by: Jacques Zarou
- Production company: Cinéas
- Distributed by: Films Sonores Tobis
- Release date: 31 December 1936
- Running time: 86 minutes
- Country: France
- Language: French

Let's Make a Dream (French: Faisons un rêve...) is a 1936 French romantic comedy film directed by Sacha Guitry and starring Guitry, Raimu and Jacqueline Delubac. It is an adaptation of the 1916 play of the same title by Guitry. It was shot at the Epinay Studios on the outskirts of Paris, and distributed by the French subsidiary of Tobis Film. The film's sets were designed by the art director Robert Gys.

== Cast ==
- Sacha Guitry as L'amant
- Raimu as Le mari
- Jacqueline Delubac as La femme
- Arletty as Une invitée (prologue)
- Louis Baron fils as Un invité (prologue)
- Pierre Bertin as Un invité (prologue)
- Victor Boucher as Un invité (prologue)
- Jean Coquelin as Un invité (prologue)
- Claude Dauphin as Un invité (prologue)
- Rosine Deréan as Une invitée (prologue)
- Yvette Guilbert as Une invitée (prologue)
- André Lefaur as Un invité (prologue)
- Marcel Lévesque a Un invité (prologue)
- Marguerite Moreno as Une invitée (prologue)
- Gabriel Signoret as Un invité (prologue)
- Michel Simon as Un invité (prologue)
- Andrée Guize as Une servante
- Robert Seller as Un maître d'hôtel
- Louis Kerly as Le valet de chambre

== Bibliography ==
- Dayna Oscherwitz & MaryEllen Higgins. The A to Z of French Cinema. Scarecrow Press, 2009.
