= The Adventure of the Speckled Band =

Short story by Arthur Conan Doyle

- Short story by Sir Arthur Conan Doyle
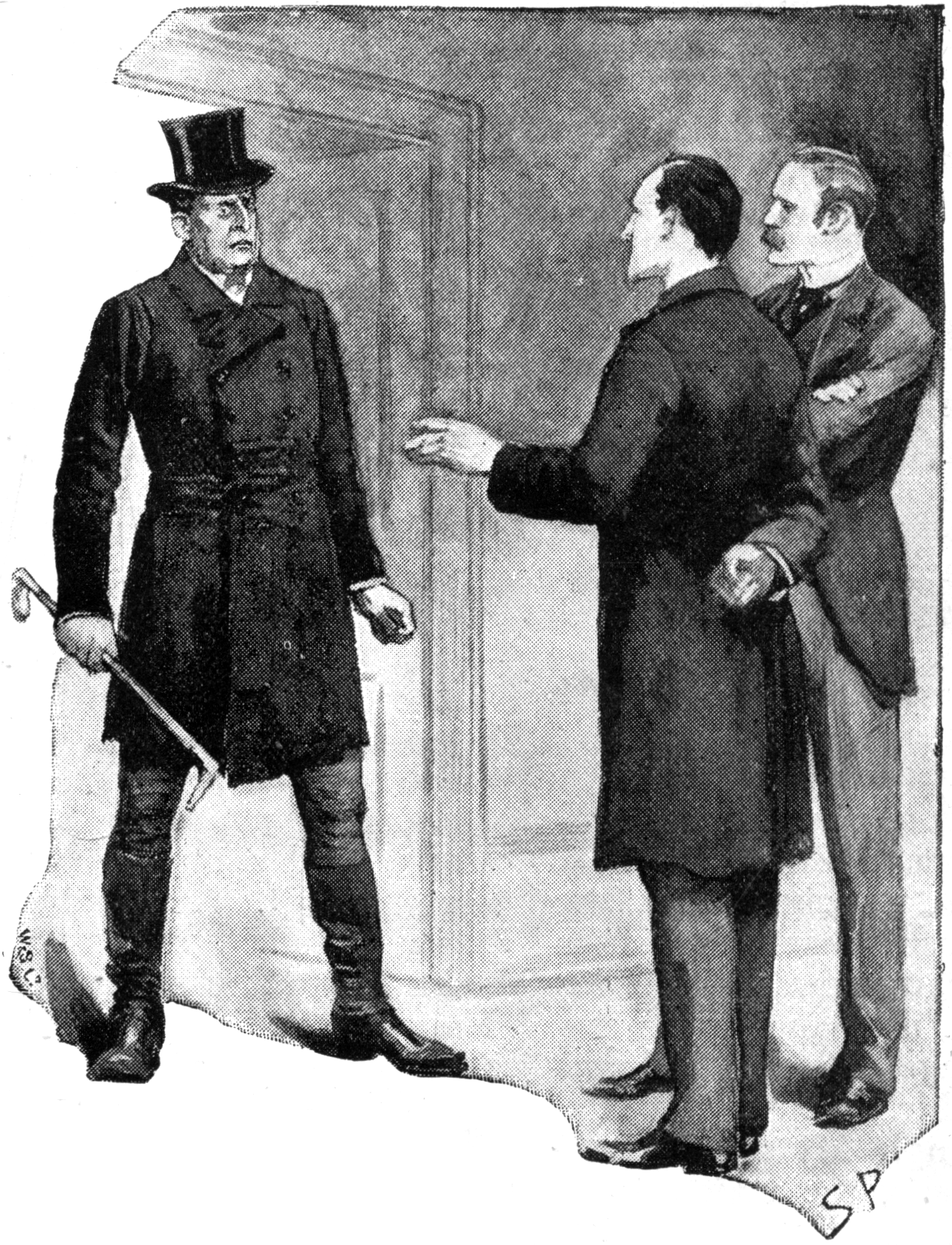
- Dr. Roylott (left) confronts Holmes and Watson. 1892 illustration by Sidney Paget

Text available at Wikisource
- Country: United Kingdom
- Language: English
- Genre: Detective fiction short stories

Publication
- Published in: The Strand Magazine
- Published in English: February 1892

Chronology
- Series: The Adventures of Sherlock Holmes
The Blue Carbuncle	The Adventure of the Engineer's Thumb

"The Adventure of the Speckled Band" is one of 56 short Sherlock Holmes stories written by Sir Arthur Conan Doyle, the eighth story of twelve in the collection The Adventures of Sherlock Holmes. It was originally published in Strand Magazine in February 1892.

"The Speckled Band" is a classic locked-room mystery that deals with the themes of parental greed, inheritance and freedom. Tinged with Gothic elements, it is considered by many to be one of Doyle's finest works, with the author himself calling it his best story. The story, alongside the rest of the Sherlock Holmes canon, has become a defining part of detective fiction. It has been adapted for television, film, theatre, radio and a video game. It is part of the exhibit at the Sherlock Holmes Museum. The theatrical adaptation was written and produced by Doyle himself, directed by and starring Lyn Harding as Grimesby Roylott. The role of Holmes was played by H. A. Saintsbury. Doyle famously clashed with Harding over several details of the script, but later reconciled with him after the universal success of the play.

== Plot ==
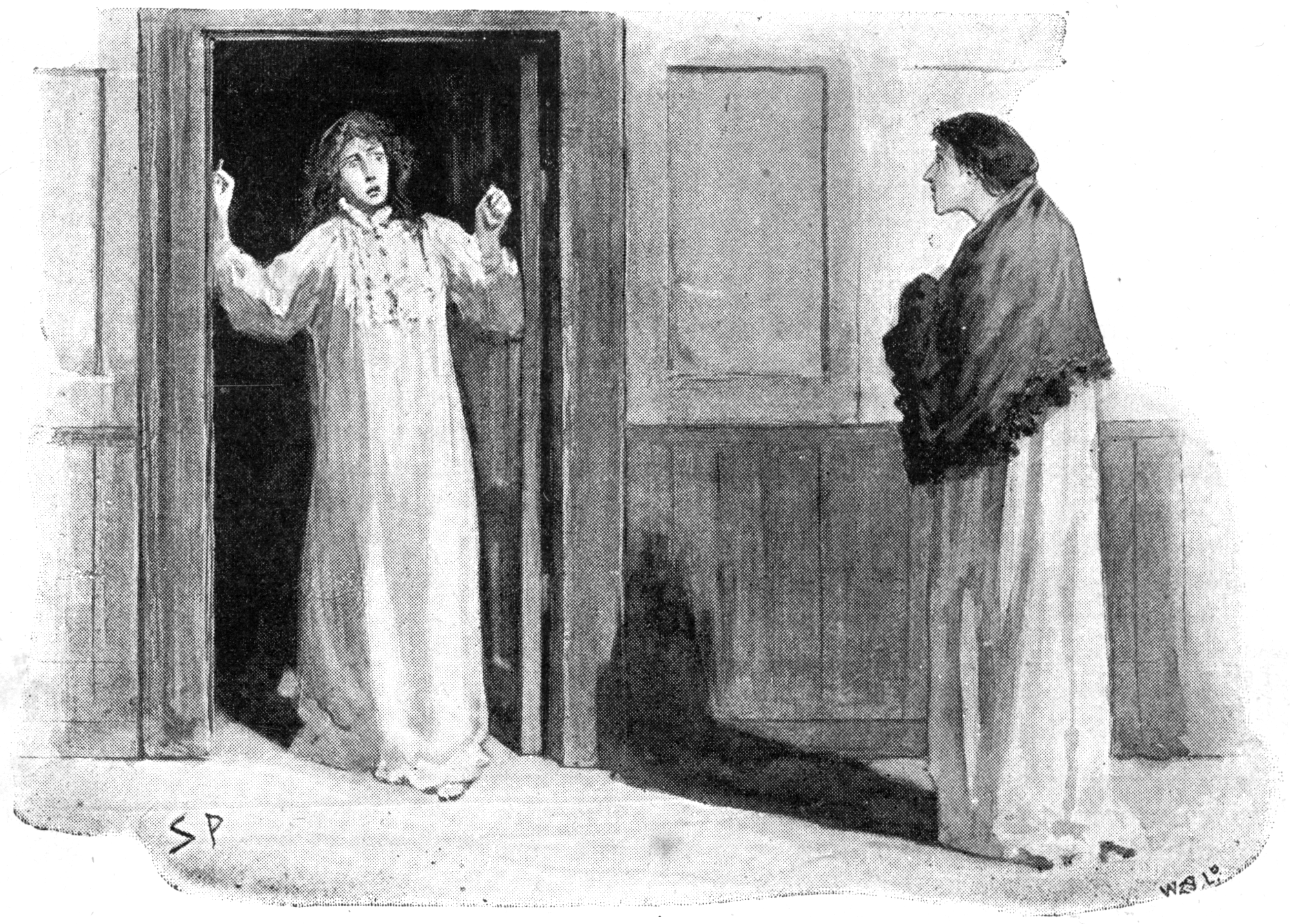
The death of Julia Stoner

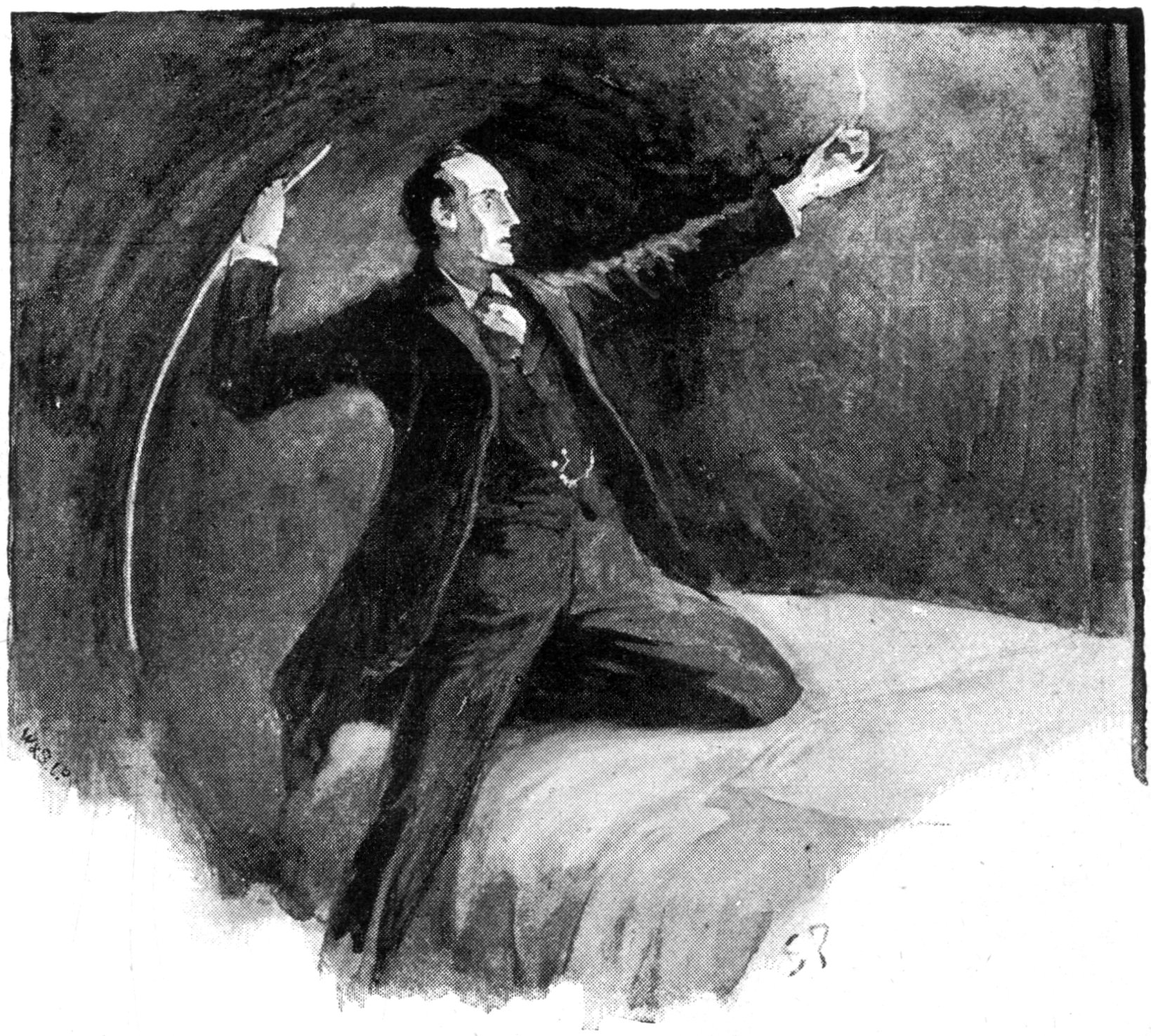
Holmes striking at the speckled band

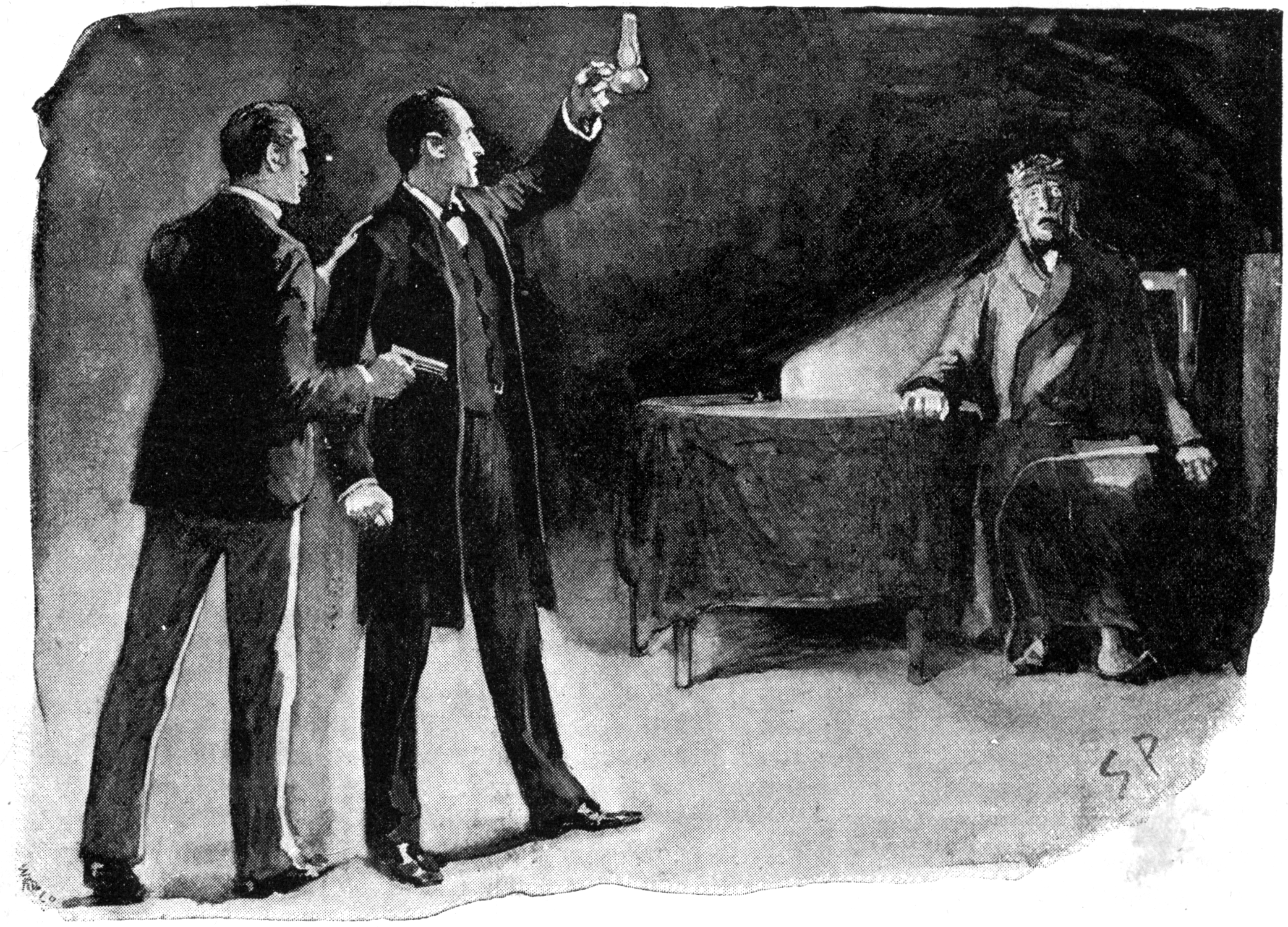
The death of Dr. Roylott

In April 1883, Sherlock Holmes and Dr. John Watson rise early one morning to meet a young woman named Helen Stoner, who is in great fear of her life. She explains that her mother married her stepfather, Dr. Grimesby Roylott, in British India when Helen and her twin sister Julia were two years old. Dr. Roylott is the impoverished sole survivor of a formerly wealthy but ill-tempered, violent, and amoral aristocratic Anglo-Saxon family in Surrey. He had served time in an Indian prison for killing his Indian butler in a rage. Afterwards, Roylott had moved to England and retired after Helen's mother was killed in a railway accident eight years prior. The sisters lived at the heavily mortgaged and debt ridden Roylott estate of Stoke Moran; Dr. Roylott's violent temper and physical strength make him a terror in the local village.

The sisters did not live happily, but when Julia got engaged two years prior, things promised to improve. Shortly before her wedding day, Julia confided in Helen that she had heard a low whistle in the night. That same night, Helen was startled out of bed by her sister's scream. Helen found Julia at her door, warning of "the speckled band" shortly before dying. The official inquest was unable to determine the cause of death: the room was securely locked both inside and outside, and the doctors could find no poison.

Two years later, it was Helen's turn to get engaged. However, when Roylott started repairs outside the house, she had to move into Julia's old room. One night, she heard the whistle that heralded her sister's death; terrified, she approached Holmes the next day.

After Holmes agrees to take the case, he is visited by Roylott, who threatens to harm him if he interferes. Undaunted, Holmes leaves for the courthouse to examine Helen's mother's will; because of the fall in investment prices the yearly income of £1,100 (equivalent to £121,000 in 2025), is not more than £750 (equivalent to £82,000 in 2025). Each daughter can claim an income of £250 (equivalent to £27,000 in 2025), in case of marriage, and Roylott would not have much to live on. He and Watson then travel to Stoke Moran, where he scrutinizes the premises. Within Helen's room, he discovers her bed is anchored to the floor, an unconnected bell cord has been installed, and a ventilator hole connects her room to Roylott's. In Roylott's room, they notice a large safe and a saucer of milk. While discussing his findings with Watson, Holmes remarks that Roylott is comparable to Drs. William Palmer and Edward William Pritchard.

Holmes instructs Helen to stay in Julia's old room until Roylott has retired for the night, then to show a light at the window and return to her room. Once she has done so, Holmes and Watson sneak onto the grounds and climb into Julia's room. After a tense wait, they hear a slight metallic noise and see a dim light through the ventilator, followed by a hissing sound. Holmes lights a candle and strikes at the bell cord, and they hear a terrifying scream. Holmes and Watson go to Roylott's room, where they see the "speckled band" – a fictional venomous swamp adder which Holmes identifies as the most poisonous snake in India. Angered by Holmes' blows, the snake had attacked Roylott, killing him. In order to prevent his daughters from marrying and so reducing his annual income, he had trained the snake to crawl through the ventilator and down the bell cord, bite anyone sleeping in Julia's bed, and return at his whistle (using the milk as a lure). He kept it in the safe during the day as a safety precaution.

The official inquest rules Roylott met his fate while indiscreetly playing with a dangerous pet. Though Holmes also admits to indirectly killing Roylott, he does not foresee it troubling him and chooses not to tell the police Roylott's full motive to spare Helen any further grief.

== Inspirations ==
Richard Lancelyn Green, the editor of the 2000 Oxford paperback edition of The Adventures of Sherlock Holmes, surmises that Doyle's source for the story appears to have been the article named "Called on by a Boa Constrictor. A West African Adventure" in Cassell's Saturday Journal, published in February 1891. In the article, a captain tells how he was dispatched to a remote camp in West Africa to stay in a tumbledown cabin that belonged to a Portuguese trader. On the first night in the cabin, he is awoken by a creaking sound, and sees "a dark queer-looking thing hanging down through the ventilator above it". It turns out to be the largest Boa constrictor that he has seen (more likely a python because there are no boas in Africa). He is paralysed with fear as the serpent comes down into the room. Unable to cry out for help, the captain spots an old bell that hung from a projecting beam above one of the windows. The bell cord had rotted away, but by means of a stick, he manages to ring it and raise the alarm.

== Identity of 'the speckled band' ==
"It is a swamp adder!" cried Holmes; "the deadliest snake in India. He has died within ten seconds of being bitten."

The key characteristics to be considered in identification of the snake are:

- A fast-acting neurotoxic venom, as opposed to the common haemotoxic venom of most snakes
- Ability to climb well
- Appearance described as a "yellow band with brownish speckles", a "squat, diamond-shaped" head, and a "puffed" neck
- An Indian origin

There is no real-life snake that matches all of these characteristics. The snake that comes closest is the Indian cobra.

== Publication history ==
"The Adventure of the Speckled Band" was first published in the UK in The Strand Magazine in February 1892, and in the United States in the US edition of the Strand in March 1892. The story was published with nine illustrations by Sidney Paget in The Strand Magazine. It was included in the short story collection The Adventures of Sherlock Holmes, which was published in October 1892.

== Adaptations ==
First play publication

=== Theatre ===
- Conan Doyle wrote an adaptation for the stage in 1910, The Speckled Band. It premiered at the Adelphi Theatre, London, on 4 June 1910, transferred to the Globe Theatre on 8 August and closed on 29 October after 169 performances. The following year the play was seen in Manchester at the Prince's Theatre and may have toured the British provinces.
- In autumn 2013, a new stage adaptation, Sherlock Holmes and the Speckled Band, by Max Gee premiered at Treasurer's House, York and Ripley Castle, Ripley, North Yorks. The play was produced by Theatre Mill, directed by Samuel Wood, and starred Liam Tims as Holmes and Adam Elms as Watson.

=== Film ===
- The short story was also adapted for the now-lost 1912 British–French short film The Speckled Band as part of the Éclair film series featuring Georges Tréville as Sherlock Holmes.
- A 1923 silent short film was adapted in the Stoll film series starring Eille Norwood as Holmes.
- The 1931 film The Speckled Band, starring Raymond Massey as the detective, was an adaptation of Conan Doyle's stage play, with Lyn Harding reprising his role as Grimesby Roylott.
- The 1944 film The Spider Woman is based on several Holmes stories, among them "The Speckled Band".

=== Radio and audio dramas ===
- The premiere episode of The Adventures of Sherlock Holmes featured an adaptation of the story on 20 October 1930 and starred William Gillette as Holmes and Leigh Lovell as Watson. The production was adapted by Edith Meiser. A remake of the script aired on 17 September 1931, with Richard Gordon playing Sherlock Holmes and Leigh Lovell again playing Dr. Watson. Another dramatization of the story aired in February 1933 with Gordon and Lovell, though it is unclear if this was a repeated recording or a new production. A remake of the script aired on 1 February 1936, with Gordon as Holmes and Harry West as Watson.
- A half-hour radio adaptation starring Basil Rathbone and Nigel Bruce was broadcast as an episode of the series The New Adventures of Sherlock Holmes on 16 October 1939, again adapted by Edith Meiser. Other episodes adapted from the story also aired in March 1941, October 1943, and November 1945, again with Rathbone and Bruce playing Holmes and Watson respectively. A half-hour radio adaptation starring Tom Conway as Holmes and Bruce as Watson was broadcast on 23 June 1947. A half-hour radio adaptation starring John Stanley as Holmes and Wendell Holmes (using the pseudonym "George Spelvin") as Watson aired as an episode of the same series on 19 December 1948, and was adapted by Max Ehrlich.
- A 1945 BBC Home Service adaptation, dramatised by John Dickson Carr, starred Cedric Hardwicke as Holmes and Finlay Currie as Watson.
- A 1948 radio adaptation on the Home Service, also adapted by John Dickson Carr, featured Howard Marion-Crawford as Holmes, with Finlay Currie again playing Watson. Howard Marion-Crawford later played Watson in the 1954–1955 television series Sherlock Holmes.
- A radio adaptation with John Gielgud as Holmes and Ralph Richardson as Watson aired in 1955 on NBC radio.
- A half-hour BBC radio adaptation was broadcast in July 1962 on the BBC Light Programme, as part of the 1952–1969 radio series starring Carleton Hobbs as Holmes and Norman Shelley as Watson. Michael Hardwick adapted the production.
- In 1970, an audio drama based on the story was released on LP record, as one of several recordings starring Robert Hardy as Holmes and Nigel Stock as Watson. It was dramatized and produced by Michael Hardwick (who also adapted the 1962 radio adaptation) and Mollie Hardwick.
- A one-hour radio adaptation was broadcast as an episode of the series CBS Radio Mystery Theater on 28 June 1977. The episode starred Kevin McCarthy as Sherlock Holmes and Court Benson as Dr. Watson.
- A BBC Radio 4 dramatisation adapted by Vincent McInerney aired on 9 January 1991, as part of the 1989–1998 radio series starring Clive Merrison as Holmes and Michael Williams as Watson. It also featured Susan Wooldridge as Helen Stoner.
- In June 2011 Big Finish Productions produced a reading of the story as Sherlock Holmes: The Speckled Band starring Nicholas Briggs as Sherlock Holmes and Richard Earl as Dr. Watson.
- The story was adapted as a 2015 episode of the radio series The Classic Adventures of Sherlock Holmes, with John Patrick Lowrie as Holmes and Lawrence Albert as Watson.
- In 2024, the story was adapted as the first three episodes of the Sherlock Holmes Short Stories podcast, read by Hugh Bonneville and produced by the Noiser Podcast Network.

=== Television ===
- A half-hour television adaptation starring Alan Napier and Melville Cooper was broadcast as the tenth episode of the NBC Television series Your Show Time on 25 March 1949. This is one of the earliest known television appearances of Holmes.
- The pilot episode of the BBC's 1964–1965 series Sherlock Holmes was a new version of "The Speckled Band", airing in May 1964 as part of the Detective anthology series. The episode was written by Giles Cooper, was directed by Robin Midgley, and starred Douglas Wilmer as Holmes, Nigel Stock as Watson and Felix Felton as Roylott.
- "The Speckled Band" was adapted for the screen in the USSR in 1979 with Vasily Livanov as Sherlock Holmes and Vitaly Solomin as Doctor Watson.
- "The Case of the Speckled Band" was the second episode of the Polish TV series Sherlock Holmes and Doctor Watson, with Geoffrey Whitehead as Sherlock Holmes and Donald Pickering as Doctor Watson, first broadcast in 1979.
- "The Speckled Band" was the sixth episode of the first series of Holmes adaptations by Granada Television starring Jeremy Brett as Sherlock Holmes and David Burke as Dr. John Watson, first broadcast in 1984, with Rosalie Williams as Mrs. Hudson, Jeremy Kemp as Dr. Grimesby Roylott, Rosalyn Landor as Helen Stoner, Denise Armon as Julia Stoner and Stephen Mallatratt as Percy Armitage.
- "The Speckled Band" was adapted as part of the 1984–85 anime series Sherlock Hound. In this version, Moriarty poses as Roylott to steal Helen's money, and Hound gets involved when his motorcar breaks down and must stay at their home for the night.
- Kōki Mitani adapted "The Adventure of the Speckled Band" and "The Creeping Man" to an episode in the NHK puppetry series Sherlock Holmes. One night, a swamp adder with crocus-shaped speckles is found in Beeton School. On the next day, trainee teacher Helen Stoner visits Holmes and Watson in 221B of Baker Dormitory and tells them about the strange behaviour of Grimesby Roylott who teaches chemistry. That night they find out what his behaviour means but Sherman, a female pupil is attacked by the adder.
- The animated television series Sherlock Holmes in the 22nd Century featured an adaptation of the story called "The Scales of Justice". In this story, Dr. Grimesby Roylott is a herpetologist and Helen is his daughter. Holmes, Watson, and Lestrade suspect Roylott's colleague, Thornus Chapman, of having created a snake creature who was committing robberies like how he created the other biological Chimeras. It is later revealed that Roylott had used Chapman's technology to turn himself into a python hybrid. Holmes defeats Roylott's python form by knocking him out with cold water.

=== Video games ===
- The Great Ace Attorney: Adventures adapted "The Speckled Band" into the game's second episode, "The Adventure of the Unbreakable Speckled Band".

=== Other adaptations ===
- "Sherlock Holmes and the Speckled Band" is among the Bepuzzled series of mystery puzzle games by University Games Corporation. This entry in the series is unique in that included story is not written by a modern author, but is instead the entirety of Conan Doyle's original tale, used to introduce the mystery to which the assembled puzzle image displays the solution.
