= Serge Sandberg =

- Born: 27 November 1879; Kaunas, Russian Empire
- Died: 5 January 1981 (aged 101); Nice, France
- Occupation: Producer
- Years active: 1916-1938 (film)
- Relatives: Francine Sandberg (granddaughter)

Serge Sandberg (1879–1981) was a French film producer. Born in Kaunas, then part of the Russian Empire, he emigrated to France in 1900 and initially found work with Pathé. He later went into production for himself, working for Eclair. In 1921 he and his business partner Louis Nalpas established their own Victorine Studios in Nice. In the 1930s he produced several of the hit comedies directed by and starring Sacha Guitry.

He was also involved in the re-establishment of the Pasdeloup Orchestra after the First World War.

His granddaughter Francine Sandberg is a film editor and his grandson Marc is a film historian.

== Selected filmography ==
- Mathias Sandorf (1921)
- A Foolish Maiden (1929)
- Napoleon at Saint Helena (1929)
- Confessions of a Cheat (1936)
- Let's Make a Dream (1936)
- The New Testament (1936)
- My Father Was Right (1936)
- The Pearls of the Crown (1937)
- Désiré (1937)

== Bibliography ==
- Barton, Ruth. Rex Ingram: Visionary Director of the Silent Screen. University Press of Kentucky, 2014.
