= Let's Make a Dream (play) =

- Written by: Sacha Guitry
- Original language: French
- Genre: Comedy

Premiere
- Date premiered: 3 October 1916
- Place premiered: Théâtre des Bouffes-Parisiens

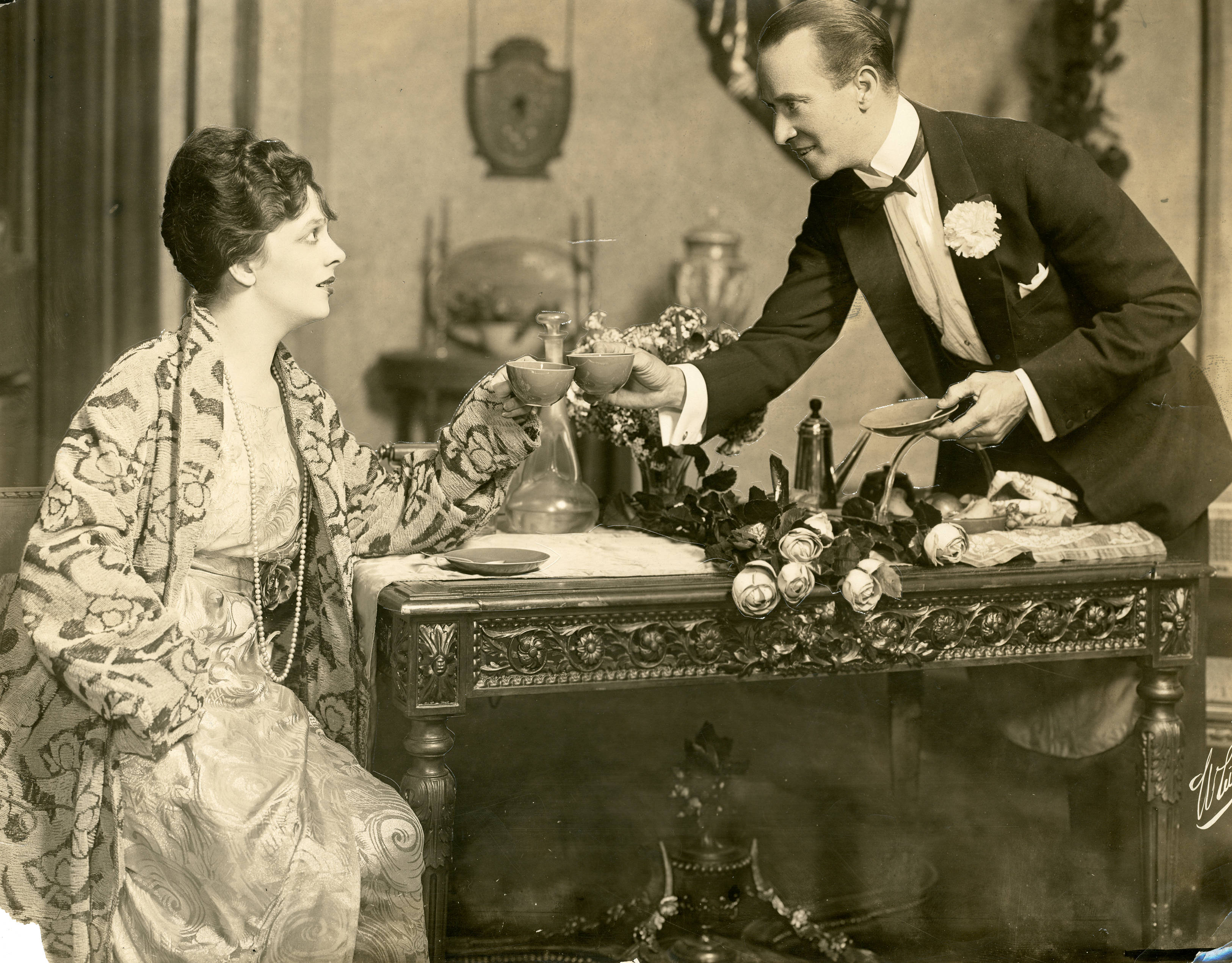
Edna Goodrich and H. B. Warner in the 1920 touring production of Sleeping Partners, the 1918 Broadway adaptation of Guitry's play

Let's Make a Dream (French: Faisons un rêve) is a 1916 comedy play by the French writer Sacha Guitry. It premiered at the Théâtre des Bouffes-Parisiens in Paris on 3 October 1916, and has been revived numerous times.

== Adaptations ==
In 1930 it was turned into the British film Sleeping Partners directed by Seymour Hicks. A French adaptation Let's Make a Dream followed in 1936, directed by Guitry himself.
