= Saint-Laurent-du-Var Studios =

Film studios located in Nice

The Saint-Laurent-du-Var Studios were film studios located in Saint-Laurent-du-Var on the French Riviera, in the suburbs of Nice. They were one of two studios in the city along with the nearby Victorine Studio complex.

Constructed in 1920 the studios were often used by company's engaged in location shooting in the area, as well as by full-scale productions. In the silent era they were used by Rose Pansini and the Irish director Rex Ingram who relocated from Hollywood to Nice. In 1926 A Mother's Secret was shot there.

Along with Victorine, the studios were part of the CIMEX organisation headed by André Paulvé and were part of his co-production arrangement with Italy's Cinecitta. In November 1942 they fell into the Italian Zone of France, but when Italy changed sides the city was occupied by German forces who took over the studios and ended production there. Shooting on Box of Dreams had to be abandoned. In 1944 they were completely destroyed by an Allied bombing raid on Nice, and were never rebuilt.

== Bibliography ==
- Crisp, C.G. The Classic French Cinema, 1930-1960. Indiana University Press, 1993.
- Powrie, Phil & Rebillard, Éric. Pierre Batcheff and stardom in 1920s French cinema. Edinburgh University Press, 2009.
