= Arletty =

French actress (1898–1992)

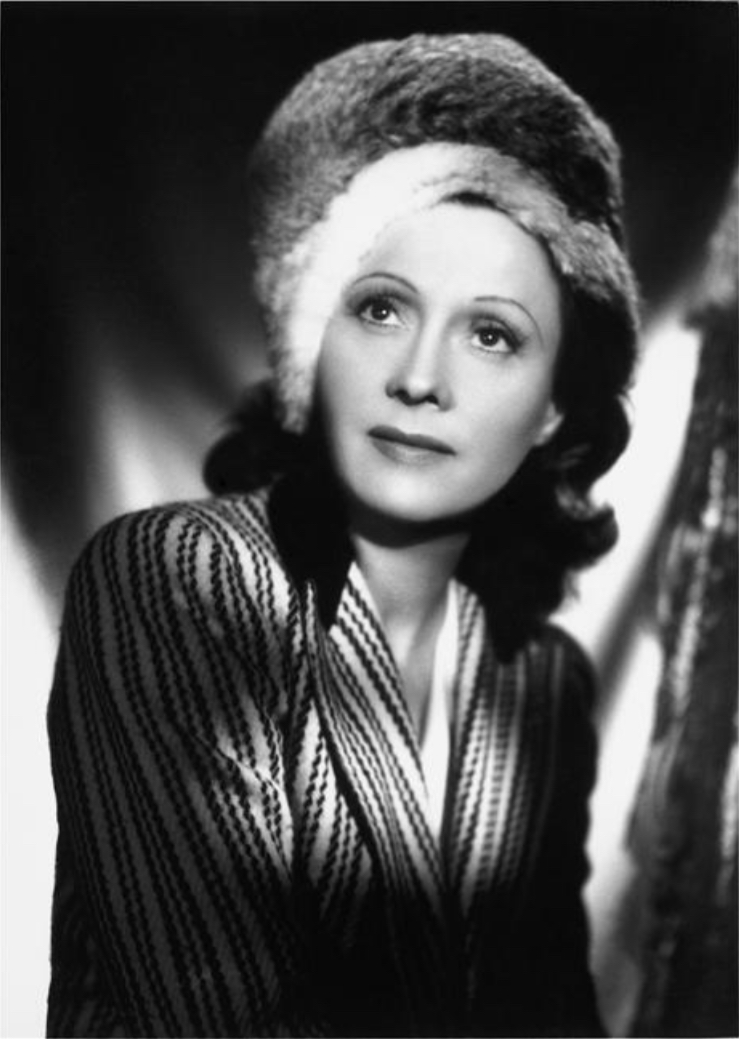
- Arletty in 1942
- Born: Léonie Marie Julie Bathiat; 15 May 1898; Courbevoie, France
- Died: 23 July 1992 (aged 94); Paris, France
- Occupations: Actress, singer, fashion model
- Years active: 1930–1963

Léonie Marie Julie Bathiat (15 May 1898 – 23 July 1992), known professionally as Arletty, was a French actress, singer, and fashion model. As an actress she is particularly known for classics directed by Marcel Carné, including Hotel du Nord (1938), Le jour se lève (1939) and Children of Paradise (1945). She was found guilty of treason for an affair with a German officer during World War II.

== Early years ==
Arletty was born on 15 May 1898 in Courbevoie (near Paris), to a working-class family. After her father's death, she left home and pursued a modeling career. She took the stage name "Arlette" based on the heroine of a story by Guy de Maupassant. She was not interested in acting until she met Paul Guillaume, an art dealer. He recommended some theaters and, at the age of 21, she was hired.

Her early career was dominated by the music hall, and she later appeared in plays and cabaret. In 1928 she performed in Maurice Yvain's operetta Yes at the Théâtre des Capucines which was written as a starring vehicle for her. Arletty was a stage performer for ten years before her film debut in 1930. Arletty's career took off around 1936 when she appeared as the leading lady in the stage plays Les Joies du Capitole and Fric-Frac, in which she starred opposite Michel Simon. She later starred as Blanche in the French version of A Streetcar Named Desire.

Marcel Carné was known for his poetic realism filmmaking style. Arletty's role of Raymonde in his film, Hotel du Nord, garnered attention for her "Atmosphere! Atmosphere!” performance. In 1945 Arletty appeared in her most famous film role, the central part of Garance in Les Enfants du Paradis, her fourth role for the director. For this role she earned one of the highest salaries ever in French cinema.

== Collaboration ==
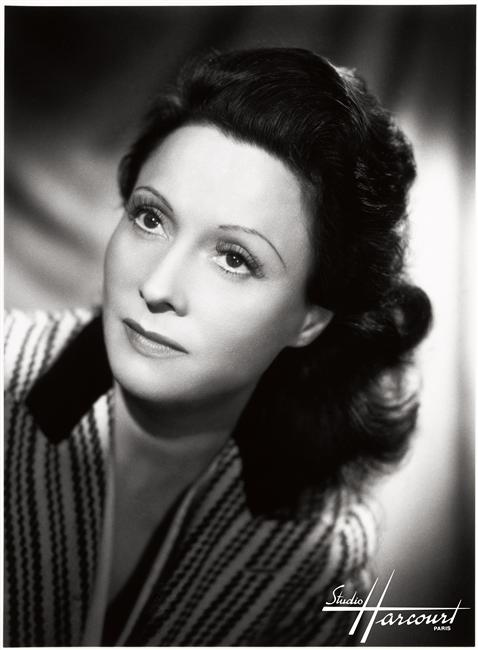
Arletty in 1943

Arletty was imprisoned in 1945 for her wartime liaison with a German Luftwaffe officer, Hans-Jürgen Soehring (1908–1960), during the occupation of France. She allegedly later commented on the experience, "My heart is French but my ass is international." The quotation in French is "Si mon cœur est français, mon cul, lui, est international". Although other French women fell in love with German soldiers, her romantic affiliation with Soehring during the German occupation prompted a charge of treason.

James Lord wrote of her special treatment:

Arletty was too well known for the mere humiliation of having her head shaved, her naked skull tarred with a swastika and in this abject state paraded through the streets to confront the jeers and spittle of the mob. Prison would be none too good for her, people said, looking forward to severe retribution for the moral treason of which they found her guilty.

For her crimes she received a sentence of eighteen months' imprisonment. She served a two-month sentence.

== Later years ==
After a moderately successful period as a stage actress in later life she was forced to retire into private life due to progressive loss of her eyesight. One of her final screen appearances was in a small role as an elderly French woman in The Longest Day (1962).

== Legacy ==
In 1995 the government of France issued a series of limited edition coins to commemorate the centenary of film that included a 100 Franc coin bearing the image of Arletty.

== Filmography ==
- The Sweetness of Loving (1930) as Une dactylo
- A Dog That Pays Off (1932) as Josyane Plaisir
- The Beautiful Adventure (1932) as Madame Desmignières
- Abduct Me (1932) as Lulu
- Mademoiselle Josette, My Woman (1933) as Unknown role
- Je te confie ma femme (1933) as Totoche
- Une idée folle (1933) as Anita - une danseuse
- Un soir de réveillon (1933) as Viviane
- Court Waltzes (1933) as La chocolatière
- Le voyage de Monsieur Perrichon (1934) as Anita Mathieu
- Pension Mimosas (1935) as La môme Parasol
- Vertigo (1935) as Emma
- Madame Angot's Daughter (1935) as Ducoudray
- Lovers and Thieves (1935) as Agathe
- La Garçonne (1936) as Niquette
- Adventure in Paris (1936) as Rose Blondel de Saint-Leu
- The Bureaucrats (1936) as La belle-soeur de la hourmerie
- Le Mari rêvé (1936) as Eve Roland
- Let's Make a Dream (1936) as Une invitée (prologue)
- Mais n'te promène donc pas toute nue (1936) as Clarisse
- Feu la mère de madame (1936) as Yvonne
- The Pearls of the Crown (1937) as La reine d'Abyssinie
- Désiré (1937) as Madeleine Crapicheau, la femme de chambre
- Aloha, le chant des îles (1937) as Ginette Gina
- Mirages (1938) as Arlette
- The Little Thing (1938) as Irma Borel
- Mother Love (1938) as Bernadette Mezin
- Hôtel du Nord (1938) as Raymonde
- Daybreak (1939) as Clara
- Fric-Frac (1939) as Loulou
- Extenuating Circumstances (1939) as Marie Qu'a-d'ça
- Thunder Over Paris (1940) as Ida
- Madame Sans-Gêne (1941) as Catherine Hubscher
- The Woman I Loved Most (1942) as Simone, l'actrice locataire
- Bolero (1942) as Catherine
- The Lover of Borneo (1942) as Stella Losange
- Les Visiteurs du soir (1942) as Dominique
- Children of Paradise (1945) as Claire Reine, dite Garance
- Madame et ses peaux-rouges (1948) as Mademoiselle Pascale
- Portrait of an Assassin (1949) as Martha
- Gigolo (1951) as Madame Alice
- Love, Madame (1952) as Herself
- The Father of the Girl (1953) as Edith Mars
- Flesh and the Woman (1954) Blanche
- The Air of Paris (1954) Blanche Le Garrec
- Huis clos (1954) as Inès, une lesbienne
- My Priest Among the Poor (1956) as Nine
- Explosive Vacation! (1957) as Arlette Bernard
- The Stowaway (1958) as Gabrielle
- And Your Sister? (1958) as Lucrèce du Boccage
- Sunday Encounter (1958) as Juliette Armier
- Maxime (1958) as Gazelle
- Paris la belle (1960, short) as Récitante / Narrator (voice)
- Les Primitifs du XIIIe (1960, short) as Récitante / Narrator (voice)
- The Dance (1962) as La mère d'Albert
- Girl on the Road (1962) as Gabrielle, maîtresse de Rameau
- The Law of Men (1962) as Loune de Lindt
- The Longest Day (1962) as Madame Barrault
- Destination Rome (1962) as La marquise
- The Trip to Biarritz (1963) as Fernande
- Dina chez les rois (1967) as Récitante / Narrator (voice)
- Jacques Prévert (1977) as Herself
- Carné, l'homme à la caméra (1985) as Herself (voice)
