= Pasteur (film) =

1935 film

- Directed by: Sacha Guitry; Fernand Rivers
- Written by: Sacha Guitry
- Produced by: Maurice Lehmann; Fernand Rivers
- Starring: Sacha Guitry; Maurice Schutz; Gaston Dubosc
- Cinematography: Jean Bachelet
- Edited by: Pierre Schwab
- Music by: Louis Beydts
- Production companies: Productions Maurice Lehmann; Les Films Fernand Rivers
- Distributed by: Les Distributeurs Français
- Release date: 20 September 1935
- Running time: 75 minutes
- Country: France
- Language: French

Pasteur is a 1935 French biographical drama film directed by Sacha Guitry and Fernand Rivers and starring Guitry, Maurice Schutz and Gaston Dubosc. It portrays the life of the French scientist Louis Pasteur. Guitry had previous written a 1919 play about Pasteur, in which his father Lucien Guitry had starred.

The film's sets were designed by the art director Robert Gys. Location shooting took place at the Sorbonne in Paris and around Pasteur's hometown of Arbois in Eastern France.

== Cast ==
- Sacha Guitry as Louis Pasteur
- Jean Périer as Le médecin
- José Squinquel as Roux, l'élève
- Maurice Schutz as Le grand-père
- Camille Beuve as Joseph Lister
- Gaston Dubosc as Le président de l'Acadèmie
- Louis Maurel as Jules Guérin
- Louis Gauthier as Un élève
- Armand Lurville as Un témoin
- Camille Cousin as Un témoin
- André Marnay as Un médecin
- François Rodon as Le petit Joseph Meister
- Henry Bonvallet as Sadi Carnot

== Bibliography ==
- Brown, Tom. Spectacle in Classical Cinemas: Musicality and Historicity in the 1930s. Routledge, 2015.
