= Fever (1942 film) =

1942 film

- Directed by: Jean Delannoy
- Written by: Charles Méré
- Produced by: René Keller; Charles Méré
- Starring: Tino Rossi; Jacqueline Delubac; Ginette Leclerc
- Cinematography: Paul Cotteret
- Edited by: Jean Delannoy
- Music by: Henri Bourtayre; Henri Goublier; Roger Lucchesi
- Production company: Les Films Minerva
- Distributed by: Les Films Minerva
- Release date: 21 January 1942
- Running time: 125 minutes
- Country: France
- Language: French

Fever (French: Fièvres) is a 1942 French drama film directed by Jean Delannoy and starring Tino Rossi, Jacqueline Delubac and Ginette Leclerc. Location shooting took place around Royan in the Occupied Zone, although it is set in Provence. The film's sets were designed by the art directors Marcel Magniez and Pierre Marquet.

== Synopsis ==
After the world-famous tenor Jean Dupray witnesses his wife Maria collapse and die during his performance, he suffers a mental breakdown and retreats to a remote monastery in Provence to live as a monk. He is haunted by the guilt he had been unfaithful to his wife. His fragile peace is shattered when the seductive Rose tracks him down, determined to lure him back to his former life of fame. Despite his vows, Jean finds himself increasingly ensnared by Yvonne’s charms, leading to a spiritual and emotional crisis. Ultimately Jean must finally choose between the sanctity of his new life and the destructive desires of his past

== Cast ==
- Tino Rossi as Le ténor Jean Dupray
- Jacqueline Delubac as Edith Watkins
- Ginette Leclerc as Rose
- Madeleine Sologne as Maria Dupray
- Mathilde Alberti as La patronne du café
- Marcelle Yrven as La vieille actrice
- Jacques Louvigny as Tardivel - l'impresario
- René Génin as Louis Martet
- Lucien Gallas as Le jeune homme traqué
- Jean Reynols as Le prieur
- André Bervil as Antonio
- André Carnège as Le médecin
- Georges Bever as Georges
- Léonce Corne as Caboussol
- Eugène Frouhins as La cabotin
- Alexandre Mathillon as Le directeur
- Frédéric Mariotti as Un convive
- Jean Pignol as L'agent
- Maxime Fabert as Charles

== Bibliography ==
- Crisp, Colin. French Cinema—A Critical Filmography: Volume 2, 1940–1958. Indiana University Press, 2015.
- Rège, Philippe. Encyclopedia of French Film Directors, Volume 1. Scarecrow Press, 2009.
- Siclier, Jacques. La France de Pétain et son cinéma. H. Veyrier, 1981.
