= Marguerite Templey =

French stage and film actress

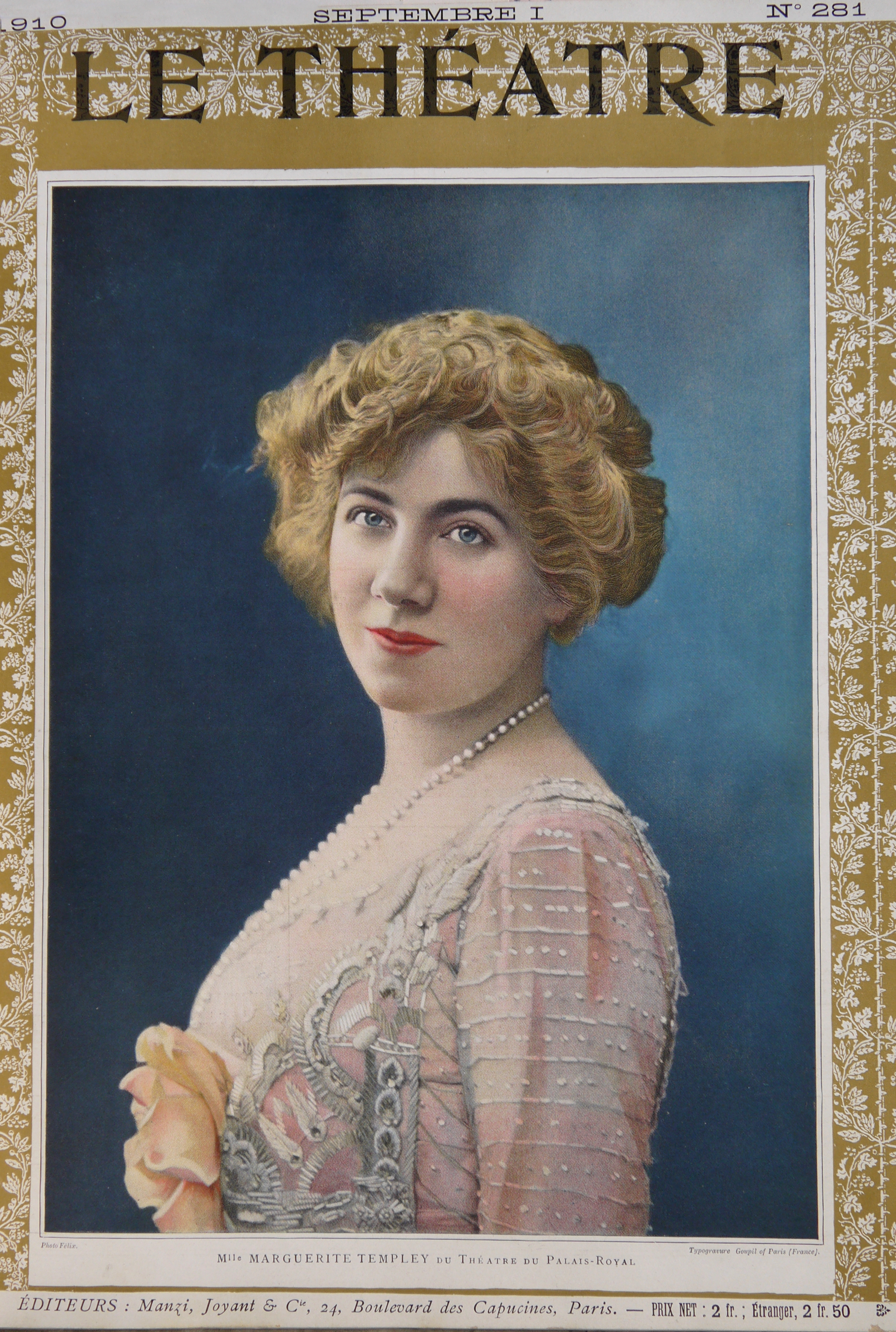
- Born: 2 March 1880; Nantes, Loire-Atlantique, France
- Died: 24 March 1944 (aged 64); Vals-les-Bains, Ardèche, France
- Occupation: Actress
- Years active: 1932–1938 (film)

Marguerite Templey (1880–1944) was a French stage and film actress.

== Selected filmography ==
- The Beautiful Adventure (1932)
- L'Épervier (1933)
- Chourinette (1934)
- Night in May (1934)
- The Secret of Woronzeff (1935)
- The Heart Disposes (1936)
- The New Testament (1936)
- A Woman of No Importance (1937)
- Counsel for Romance (1938)
- Rasputin (1938)
- Quadrille (1938)

== Bibliography ==
- Goble, Alan. The Complete Index to Literary Sources in Film. Walter de Gruyter, 1999.
