= The New Testament (film) =

1936 film

- Directed by: Sacha Guitry
- Written by: Sacha Guitry
- Based on: The New Testament by Sacha Guitry
- Produced by: Serge Sandberg; Louis Aubert
- Starring: Sacha Guitry; Jacqueline Delubac; Christian Gérard
- Cinematography: Jean Bachelet
- Production company: Cinéas
- Distributed by: Films Sonores Tobis
- Release date: 14 February 1936
- Running time: 96 minutes
- Country: France
- Language: French

The New Testament (French: Le nouveau testament) is a 1936 French comedy film directed by Sacha Guitry and starring Guitry, Jacqueline Delubac and Christian Gérard. It was adapted by Guitry from his own 1934 play of the same title. It was shot at the Saint-Maurice Studios in Paris. The film's sets were designed by the art director Maurice Dufrêne.

== Cast ==
- Sacha Guitry as Le docteur Marcelin
- Jacqueline Delubac as Juliette Lecourtois
- Christian Gérard as Fernand Worms
- Betty Daussmond as Lucie Marcelin
- Charles Dechamps as Monsieur Worms
- Marguerite Templey as Madame Worms
- Pauline Carton as Mademoiselle Morot
- Louis Kerly as Le domestique

== Bibliography ==
- Dayna Oscherwitz & MaryEllen Higgins. The A to Z of French Cinema. Scarecrow Press, 2009.
