= Quadrille (1938 film) =

1938 film

- Directed by: Sacha Guitry
- Written by: Sacha Guitry
- Produced by: Emile Natan; Joseph Spigler
- Starring: Sacha Guitry; Gaby Morlay; Jacqueline Delubac
- Cinematography: Robert Lefebvre
- Edited by: Myriam Borsoutsky
- Music by: Adolphe Borchard
- Production company: Les Films Modernes
- Distributed by: Société Nouvelle des Films Dispa
- Release date: 29 January 1938
- Running time: 95 minutes
- Country: France
- Language: French

Quadrille is a 1938 French comedy film directed by Sacha Guitry and starring Guitry, Gaby Morlay and Jacqueline Delubac. It was shot at the Joinville Studios in Paris and on location around the city. The film's sets were designed by the art director Jean Perrier. The title refers to the quadrille, a dance in which the participants keep changing partners. It was later remade as a film of the same title by Valérie Lemercier.

== Synopsis ==
In Paris the arrival of an American film star upsets the routine of a French newspaper editor and his two female companions.

== Cast ==
- Sacha Guitry as Philippe de Morannes
- Gaby Morlay as Paulette Nanteuil
- Jacqueline Delubac as Claudine André
- Georges Grey as Carl Erickson
- Pauline Carton as La femme de chambre de l'hôtel
- Jacques Vitry as Le docteur
- Louis Baldy as Durmel
- Julien Rivière as Le maître d'hôtel
- Louis Vonelly as Le chef de réception
- Paul Alex as Le concierge
- Marc Hélin as Un chasseur
- Pierre Huchet as Un valet de chambre
- Georges Lemaire as Le régisseur
- Marie-Claire Pissaro as Une femme de chambre
- Clary Monthal as Une habilleuse
- Marguerite Templey as Madame de Germond
- Adolphe Borchard as Lui-même dans le générique
- Robert Lefebvre as Lui-même dans le générique
- Ray Ventura as himself

== Bibliography ==
- Dayna Oscherwitz & MaryEllen Higgins. The A to Z of French Cinema. Scarecrow Press, 2009.
