= Quadrille (1997 film) =

1997 film

- Directed by: Valérie Lemercier
- Written by: Sacha Guitry (scenario)
- Produced by: Boudjemaa Dahmane
- Starring: Valérie Lemercier; André Dussollier; Sandrine Kiberlain; Sergio Castellitto
- Cinematography: Antoine Roch
- Edited by: Dan Facundo; Nicole Pellegrin
- Music by: Bertrand Burgalat
- Distributed by: PolyGram Film Distribution
- Release date: 23 April 1997
- Running time: 96 minutes
- Country: France
- Language: French
- Budget: $4.4 million
- Box office: $818.000

Quadrille is a 1997 French comedy film directed by and starring Valérie Lemercier. It also features André Dussollier, Sandrine Kiberlain and Sergio Castellitto.

It is a remake of Sacha Guitry's 1938 film of the same title.

== Cast ==
- Valérie Lemercier as Paulette Nanteuil
- André Dussollier as Philippe de Morannes
- Sandrine Kiberlain as Claudine André
- Sergio Castellitto as Carl Herickson
- Didier Bénureau as Doctor Lamache
- Franck de la Personne as The majordome
- Lise Lamétrie as The maid
- Michelle Dagain as The maid 2
- Nicolas Seguy as The groom
- Michel Jean as The porter
- Emmanuel Benjamin as The butler

== Bibliography ==
- Carrie Tarr & Brigitte Rollet. Cinema and the Second Sex: Women's Filmmaking in France in the 1980s and 1990s. Bloomsbury Publishing, 2016.
