= Lyn Harding =

Welsh actor (1867–1952)

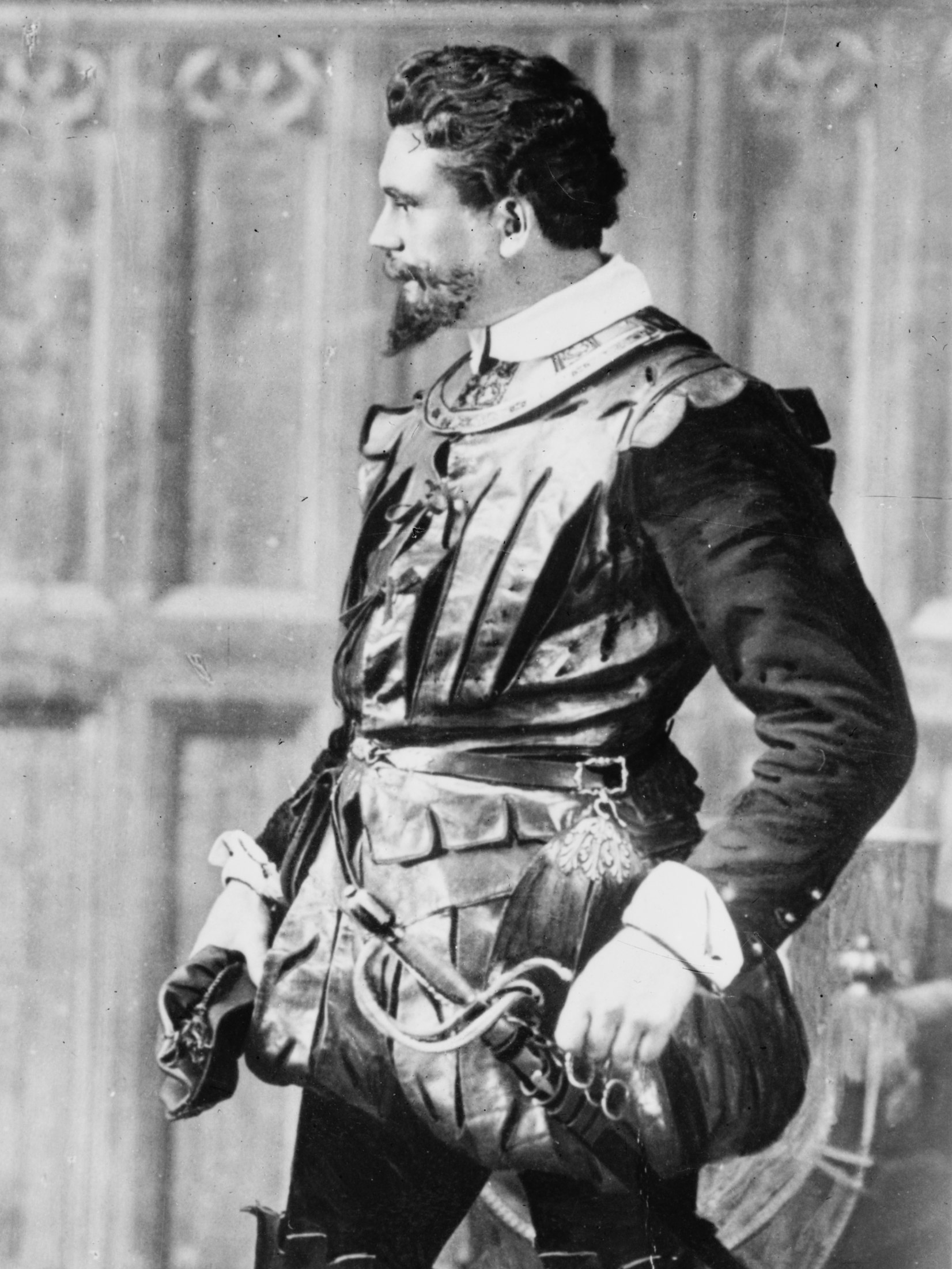
- Harding in 1915
- Born: David Llewellyn Harding; 12 October 1867; St. Brides Wentloog, Monmouthshire, Wales
- Died: 26 December 1952 (aged 85); Southend-on-Sea, Essex, England
- Occupation: Actor
- Years active: 1890–1947
- Spouse: Maria Frieda Reidacher (m. 1895)

David Llewellyn Harding (12 October 1867 – 26 December 1952), known professionally as Lyn Harding, was a Welsh actor who spent 40 years on the stage before entering British-made silent films, talkies and radio. He had an imposing and menacing stage presence and came to be cast as the villain in many films, notably Professor Moriarty in dramatisations of the Sherlock Holmes stories.

== Early years ==
He was born in 1867 at St. Brides Wentloog, in Monmouthshire, into a strict Congregationalist Welsh-speaking family.

== Acting career ==
He started his career as an apprentice draper in Newport, Wales and but he was drawn to an acting career. He began giving readings from Shakespeare at a chapel in Cardiff. In 1890 a chance meeting with a touring group on a train led to him standing in for a sick actor and his first professional engagement. He opened on 28 August 1890 in The Grip Of Iron at the Theatre Royal, Bristol.

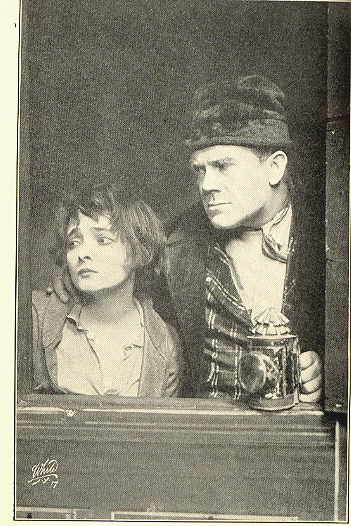
Harding with Marie Doro (left) in Oliver Twist at the New Amsterdam Theatre (1912)

He toured "the provinces" and eventually made his London debut at the Shakespeare Theatre, Clapham on 19 July 1897.

He later changed his name to "Lyn" to make it more acceptable to English audiences who found "Llewellyn" difficult to pronounce.

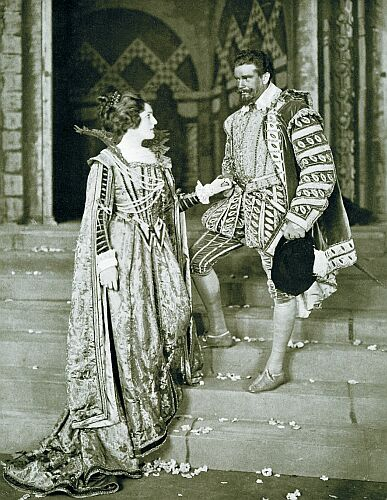
Harding as Sir Francis Drake in the 1912 play Drake, with Amy Brandon Thomas, at His Majesty's Theatre, London

In 1910, he portrayed Dr Grimesby Rylott in Arthur Conan Doyle's play The Speckled Band.

His career spanned stage, silent screen, talkies and radio productions and he toured in the United States, Japan, India and Burma. He worked at different times with John Gielgud, Ralph Richardson and Anthony Quayle.

His last stage appearance was as Abu Hassan in Chu Chin Chow in the West End in 1941 when he was 74 years old. At the age of nearly 80 he played Owain Glyndŵr in Shakespeare's Henry IV for BBC radio.

He lived for about ten years in Leverstock Green, near Hemel Hempstead where he played an active role in the local community, even staging plays and revues with fellow actors to help raise funds for a much needed parish hall. He died in London in 1952, aged 85.

== Filmography ==
Year	Title	Role	Director	Notes
1920	The Barton Mystery	Beverley	Harry T. Roberts	
1920	A Bachelor Husband	Feather Dakers	Kenelm Foss	
1922	When Knighthood Was in Flower	Henry VIII	Robert G. Vignola	
1922	Tense Moments with Great Authors	Jean Valjean	H. B. Parkinson, Walter Courtney Rowden and George Wynn	(segment "Miserables, Les")
1924	Yolanda	Charles the Bold	Robert G. Vignola	
1927	The Further Adventures of the Flag Lieutenant	The Sinister Influence	W.P. Kellino	
1927	Land of Hope and Glory	Roger Whiteford	Harley Knoles	
1930	Sleeping Partners	It	Seymour Hicks	
1931	The Speckled Band	Dr. Grimesby Roylott	Jack Raymond	
1932	The Barton Mystery	Beverly	Henry Edwards	
1933	The Constant Nymph	Albert Sanger	Basil Dean	
1934	The Man Who Changed His Name	Selby Clive	Henry Edwards	
1934	The Lash	Bronson Haughton	Henry Edwards	
1934	Wild Boy	Frank Redfern	Albert de Courville	
1935	The Triumph of Sherlock Holmes	Professor Moriarty	Leslie S. Hiscott	
1935	Escape Me Never	Herr Heinrich	Paul Czinner	
1935	An Old Spanish Custom	Gonzalo Gonzalez	Adrian Brunel	
1936	Spy of Napoleon	Otto von Bismarck	Maurice Elvey	
1936	The Man Who Changed His Mind	Professor Holloway	Robert Stevenson	
1937	Fire Over England	Sir Richard Ingolby	William K. Howard	
1937	Please Teacher	Wing Foo	Stafford Dickens	
1937	Underneath the Arches	Pedro	Redd Davis	
1937	The Pearls of the Crown	John Russell	Christian-Jaque	
1937	Knight Without Armour	Bargee	Jacques Feyder	
1937	Silver Blaze	Professor Moriarty	Thomas Bentley	
1937	The Mutiny of the Elsinore	Mr. Pike	Roy Lockwood	
1937	I, Claudius	Vespasian	Josef von Sternberg	
1939	Goodbye, Mr. Chips	Dr. John Hamilton Wetherby	Sam Wood	
1939	The Missing People	Joseph Bronstone	Jack Raymond	
1941	The Prime Minister	Otto von Bismarck	Thorold Dickinson	Uncredited, (final film role)

== Selected stage credits ==
- The Speckled Band (1910, Conan Doyle)
- Henry VIII (1916, Shakespeare)
- Wild Heather (1917, Brandon)
- Grand Hotel (1931, Knoblock)
