= A Man of No Importance =

A Man of No Importance may refer to:

- A Man of No Importance (film), a 1994 comedy drama film directed by Suri Krishnamma and written by Barry Devlin, starring Albert Finney
- A Man of No Importance (musical), with music by Stephen Flaherty, lyrics by Lynn Ahrens and a book by Terrence McNally, based on the film

== See also ==
- A Woman of No Importance, a play by Oscar Wilde
