= Tử Phác =

Vietnamese poet, musician, author

- Born: December 31, 1923; Hanoi
- Died: 1982
- Other names: Nguyễn Anh Chấn; Trương Công Kích
- Occupations: Musician; Writer
- Known for: Tiếng hát quay tơ
- Spouse: Lương Thị Nghĩa (wife)

Nguyễn Văn Kim (31 December 1923 – 1982), better known as his pen name Tử Phác, was a Vietnamese writer, poet, musician, and the author of the famous song "Song of Spinning" (Tiếng hát quay tơ), which was released in 1949. He was also an important participant in the Nhân Văn–Giai Phẩm affair.

== Biography ==
On December 31, 1923, Nguyễn Văn Kim was born in Hàng Giấy, Đồng Xuân Market, Hanoi. He had often written poems since his childhood. According to Lương Ngọc Trác, Tử Phác was originally from a feudal mandarin family, his grandfather used to be a great mandarin for the Nguyễn dynasty and surrendered to the French Army. His father, after studying in the West, returned to Hanoi to work as a road management bureaucrat. His mother was Trương Tần Phác, a descendant of Trương Định. The pseudonym Tử Phác means the son of Mrs. Phác.

In 1945, he joined the Communist Party of Vietnam, later participated in the First Indochina War. In the years 1947 and 1948, he was Secretary of the Thủ Đô newspaper in War Zone III, under the pen name Nguyễn Anh Chấn. In 1949, he was appointed to the Executive Committee of the 3rd Inter-regional Arts Association and was assigned to Viet Bac as Secretary of the Sự Thật newspaper under another pen name Trương Công Kích. A year later, he held the position of Head of the Arts and Culture Department of the Propaganda Department of the General Political Department.

He served as a general later, who was in charge of military literature in 1952. He was involved in the Nhân Văn–Giai Phẩm affair between 1957 and 1958, for which he was sent to a re-education camp. Even after being rehabilitated, he still could not find a job. With no means of support, his young children and wife had to live on the sale of his family's furniture, musical instruments and financial support from relatives in France.

Tử Phác died of cancer in 1982. Many of his works have not survived to this day due to his involvement in the Nhân Văn–Giai Phẩm affair.
