= A Woman of No Importance (1937 film) =

- Directed by: Jean Choux
- Written by: Charles Spaak; Oscar Wilde (play)
- Produced by: Arys Nissotti; Pierre O'Connell
- Starring: Pierre Blanchar; Lisette Lanvin; Marguerite Templey
- Cinematography: Jules Kruger
- Edited by: Marguerite Beaugé
- Music by: Jean Wiener
- Production company: Régina Films
- Distributed by: Films Sonores Tobis
- Release date: 5 March 1937
- Running time: 90 minutes
- Country: France
- Language: French

A Woman of No Importance (French: Une femme sans importance) is a 1937 French drama film directed by Jean Choux and starring Pierre Blanchar, Lisette Lanvin and Marguerite Templey. It is an adaptation of the 1893 play A Woman of No Importance by Oscar Wilde.

The film's sets were designed by the art director Jacques Krauss. The film was made by the French subsidiary of Tobis Film, which had made a German adaption of the story the previous year.

== Main cast ==
- Pierre Blanchar as Lord Illingworth
- Lisette Lanvin as Hester
- Marguerite Templey as Lady Hustanton
- Gilbert Gil as Gerald
- Catherine Fonteney as Lady Patricia
- Charles Granval as Le pasteur
- Jean Périer as Lord Illingworth père
- Laure Diana as Caroline
- Line Noro as Sylvia
- Jean Tissier as Lord Hustanton

== Bibliography ==
- Maurice Bessy & Raymond Chirat. Histoire du cinéma français: 1935-1939. Pygmalion, 1987.
- Rège, Philippe. Encyclopedia of French Film Directors, Volume 1. Scarecrow Press, 2009.
