= Jacqueline Delubac =

French actress (1907–1997)

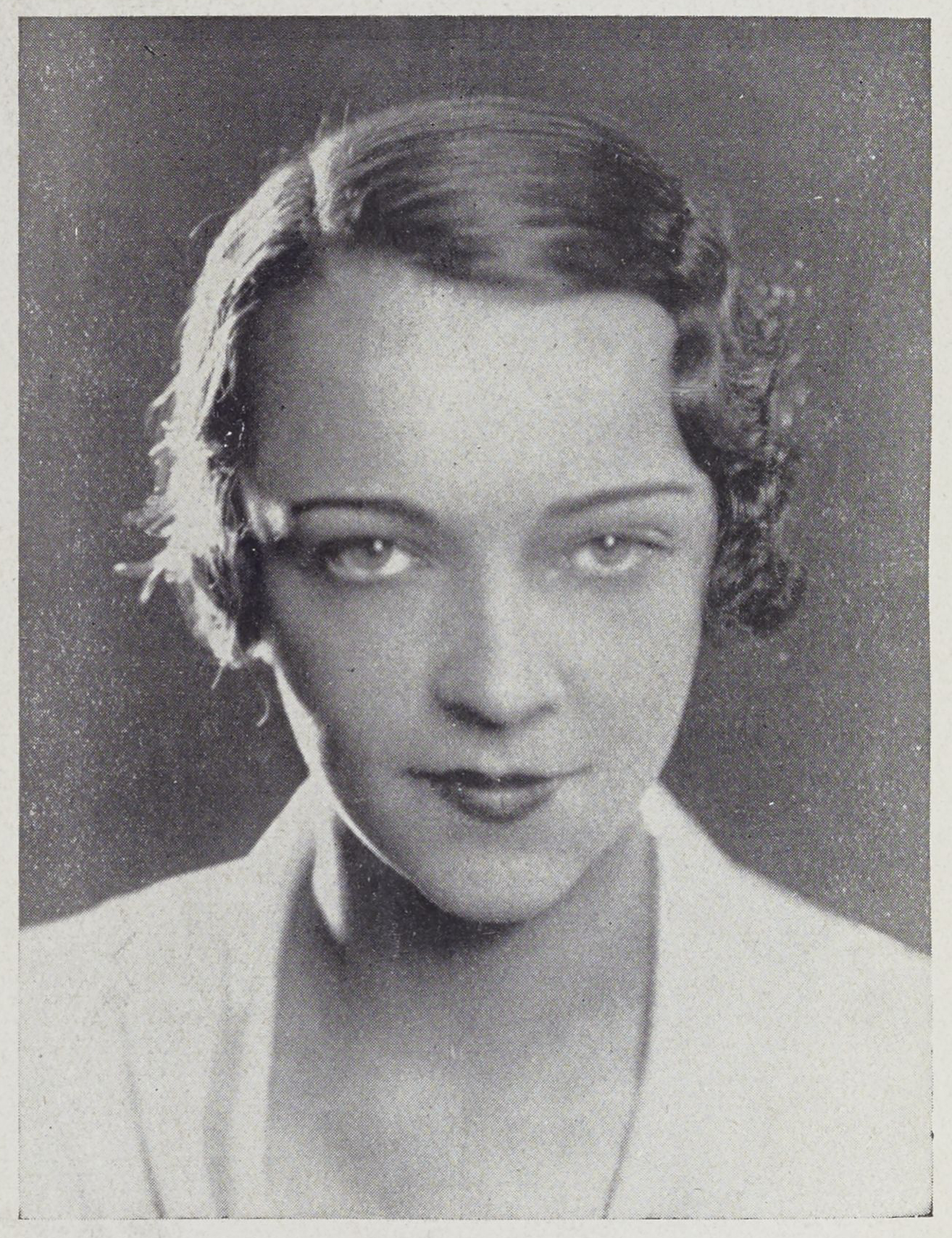
- Born: 27 May 1907; Lyon, Rhône, France
- Died: 14 October 1997 (aged 90); Créteil, Val-de-Marne, France
- Occupation: Actress
- Years active: 1930–1951 (film)

Jacqueline Delubac (1907–1997) was a French stage and film actress.

She was the third wife of actor, director and writer Sacha Guitry, to whom she was married from 1935 to 1939. She appeared in a number of his productions on both stage and screen.

== Selected filmography ==
- Chérie (1930)
- Let's Get Married (1931)
- Topaze (1933)
- Good Luck (1935)
- Confessions of a Cheat (1936)
- Let's Make a Dream (1936)
- The New Testament (1936)
- The Pearls of the Crown (1937)
- Désiré (1937)
- Quadrille (1938)
- Girls in Distress (1939)
- Hangman's Noose (1940)
- La Comédie du bonheur (The Comedy of Happiness) (1940)
- The Man Who Seeks the Truth (1940)
- Volpone (1941)
- Fever (1942)
- My First Love (1945)
- The Ferret (1950)

== See also ==
- List of French actors

== Bibliography ==
- Williams, Alan. Film and Nationalism. Rutgers University Press, 2002.
