= The Speckled Band (play) =

1910 play

- Original language: English
- Written by: Sir Arthur Conan Doyle
- Characters: Sherlock Holmes; Dr. Watson
- Genre: Drama
- Setting: London, England

Premiere
- Date: June 4, 1910
- Place: Adelphi Theatre; London, England

The Speckled Band is a 1910 play in three acts by Sir Arthur Conan Doyle, based on his own 1892 short story "The Adventure of the Speckled Band".

== Background ==
In 1909, Conan Doyle had leased the Adelphi Theatre at his own expense for a production of a boxing drama entitled The House of Temperley, which was an adaptation of his novel Rodney Stone. While the play was initially a success, the death of King Edward VII caused West End theatres to close for a month in mourning The closing spelled the demise of the play. To recoup his loses and do something with an empty theatre he had leased, Conan Doyle decided to stage a new play. Keeping in mind that William Gillette had achieved great success with his play Sherlock Holmes, which was based on an earlier Conan Doyle script, Conan Doyle wrote his own Sherlock Holmes play in a week.

"I shut myself up and devoted my whole mind to making a sensational Sherlock Holmes drama. I wrote it in a week and called it The Speckled Band after the short story of that name. I do not think I exaggerate if I say that within a fortnight of the one play shutting down I had a company working upon the rehearsals of a second one, which had been written in the interval. It was a considerable success."

Conan Doyle made some alterations to the names of his characters, with Roylott becoming Rylott, and Julia Stoner becoming Enid Stoner.

== Casting ==
Conan Doyle hired an actor with a great deal of experience as Sherlock Holmes; H. A. Saintsbury had toured the Gillette play and was on the verge of his 1,000th performance in the role. Lyn Harding was cast to play Dr. Rylott and also direct the play, a decision Conan Doyle quickly came to regret. Over the course of many rehearsals, Harding slowly transformed the character into a more idiosyncratic character which infuriated Conan Doyle. Harding desired for Rylott to be more central to the story whereas Conan Doyle wanted less of his presence. J. M. Barrie was invited to view the rehearsals and provide an opinion as he was friends with both Harding and Conan Doyle. Harding's interpretation carried the day with Barrie saying "Let Harding have his own way."

== Production ==
The play premiered on 4 June 1910. The play was an immediate success and Harding's performance was adored by critics. Proven wrong, Conan Doyle sent Harding a letter of congratulations. Over time, Conan Doyle came to appreciate Harding's performance.

"Lyn Harding, as the half-epileptic and wholly formidable Doctor Grimesby Rylott, was most masterful, while Saintsbury as Sherlock Holmes was also very good. Before the end of the run, I had cleared off all that I had lost upon the other play, and I had created a permanent property of some value. It became a stock piece and is even now touring the country."

The snake used in performances was less appreciated.

"We had a fine rock boa to play the title-rôle, a snake which was the pride of my heart, so one can imagine my disgust when I saw that one critic ended his disparaging review by the words, 'The crisis of the play was produced by the appearance of a palpably artificial serpent.' I was inclined to offer him a goodly sum if he would undertake to go to bed with it. The real fault of the play was that in trying to give Holmes a worthy antagonist I overdid it and produced a more interesting personality in the villain. The terrible ending was also against it."

The Speckled Band ran at the Adelphi Theatre until 6 August, after which it immediately transferred to the Globe Theatre to complete a run of 169 London performances, closing on 29 October. A British tour followed in the autumn of 1911 but the only actor from the original company to land a role was A. Corney Grain, now promoted from James B. Montague to play Holmes himself. Arthur Vezin, son of the American actor Hermann Vezin, was Watson. The characters Inspector Downing, Peters and Mrs. Soames appear to have been omitted on tour.

Autumn of 1910 brought the production to Boston, Massachusetts and later New York City, New York with Harding continuing in as Rylott but Holmes recast with Charles Millward taking the role.

=== Cast ===
- H. A. Saintsbury as Sherlock Holmes
- Lyn Harding as Dr Grimesby Rylott
- Claude King as Doctor Watson
- Christine Silver as Enid Stoner

== Revivals ==
In 1914, the Chicago, Illinois production cast H. Cooper Cliffe in the role of Holmes with Harding continuing as Rylott. There was a London revival in 1921 with H. A. Saintsbury returning to the role of Holmes.

== Film adaptation ==
The play was adapted to film in 1931 as The Speckled Band with Lyn Harding repeating his role as Dr. Grimesby Rylott and starring Raymond Massey as Sherlock Holmes.

== Sources ==
- Barnes, Alan (2002). Sherlock Holmes on Screen. Reynolds & Hearn Ltd. ISBN 1-903111-04-8.
- Boström, Mattias (2018). From Holmes to Sherlock. Mysterious Press. ISBN 978-0-8021-2789-1.
- Bunson, Matthew (1997). Encyclopedia Sherlockiana. Simon & Schuster. ISBN 0-02-861679-0.
- DeWaal, Ronald Burt (1974). The World Bibliography of Sherlock Holmes. Bramhall House. p. 367. ISBN 0-517-217597.
- Eyles, Allen (1986). Sherlock Holmes: A Centenary Celebration. Harper & Row. ISBN 0-06-015620-1.
- Redmond, Christopher (2009). Sherlock Holmes Handbook: Second Edition. Dundurn Press. ISBN 9781459718982.
- Starrett, Vincent (1993). The Private Life of Sherlock Holmes. Otto Penzler Books. ISBN 1-883402-05-0.
