= The Speckled Band (1931 film) =

1931 film

- Trade advertisement
- Directed by: Jack Raymond
- Written by: Arthur Conan Doyle (story); W. P. Lipscomb (adaptation)
- Produced by: Herbert Wilcox
- Starring: Lyn Harding; Raymond Massey; Angela Baddeley; Nancy Price
- Cinematography: Freddie Young
- Edited by: Maclean Rogers
- Production company: British & Dominions Film Corporation
- Distributed by: Woolf & Freedman Film Service
- Release date: 5 March 1931
- Running time: 90 minutes
- Country: United Kingdom
- Language: English

The Speckled Band is a 1931 British mystery film directed by Jack Raymond and starring Lyn Harding, Raymond Massey (in his first leading role) and Angela Baddeley. It was written by W. P. Lipscomb, adapted from Arthur Conan Doyle's original 1892 story "The Adventure of the Speckled Band" and the 1910 play he adapted from it, The Speckled Band. The film was re-issued in 1938.

The film features Sherlock Holmes and Dr. John Watson investigating the fears of a young woman and the suspicious death of her sister.

== Plot summary ==
The film begins on the Rylott estate with gypsies camping on the grounds. Inside the mansion, Violet Stonor screams in her bedroom and then collapses in the hallway. She is discovered by her sister, Helen. Violet's dying words are "the band, speckled." She then dies and their stepfather, Dr. Grimesby Rylott, arrives.

Soon there is an inquest into the mysterious death, and Rylott plots with the housekeeper and his Indian servant, Ali. Watson attends the inquest as an old friend of the Stonor family in India. He acts protectively to Helen and advises her to consult Holmes if she ever feels in danger. At Baker Street later, Watson summarises the inquest to Holmes, describing the various witnesses and evidence. Holmes files it away in his system—he operates a modern office with female secretaries and a voice recording device.

One year later, Helen Stonor is engaged, and her fiancé must leave for a plantation in Rangoon for a year. Helen is afraid and suggests that they marry sooner, so that she may go with him to Rangoon. Dr. Rylott is upset by these plans and decides to murder her to prevent the loss of her inheritance. Rylott forces Helen to move from her room into Violet's old room. The next day, Helen meets with Holmes and Watson in Baker Street they describe her case. Her sister Violet had been engaged to be married before she dies, and Helen remembers hearing mysterious music that night. Now Helen is engaged and is also hearing the mysterious music again. Holmes questions her and sends her out of the room through a separate entrance when her stepfather arrives. Dr. Rylott barges in and threatens Holmes, but he is not deterred.

In the afternoon, Dr. Watson arrives alone to visit Helen Stonor while her stepfather is not home. Holmes is in disguise as a workman dealing with the repairs to the building. Together they investigate Dr. Rylott's room and discover several clues, such as a bowl of milk, a dog whip, and a mirror. Next, they investigate Violet's room, which has a bell-rope that doesn't ring and a ventilator near the bed. The ventilator opens into Rylott's room but is hidden by a painting. When Rylott returns, Holmes and Watson temporarily leave Helen at the house but plan to sneak into the room later to investigate.

That night, Helen spends the night within Violet's room while Holmes and Watson secretly keep watch with her. After snake-charming music plays, a snake enters the room through the ventilator, and Holmes attacks it, sending it back to Rylott's room. Rylott screams. Holmes, Watson, and Helen enter his room and discover Rylott dead from a snake bite. Holmes forces Ali, the servant, to charm the snake so they can put it in the safe. Violet's last words about a "speckled band" were in fact describing "a swamp adder, the deadliest snake in India". The venomous snake had been sent to Violet's room by Dr. Rylott to murder her for her inheritance. Rylott had intended to do the same to Helen.

The movie ends with Holmes conducting an experiment in Baker Street. Watson arrives dressed for a wedding, and Holmes therefore deduces that he is going to a wedding. Watson is pleased to tell Holmes that he is wrong, that he has just come from the wedding of Helen Stonor and her groom. Holmes offers his "condolences" rather than congratulations. Watson says in amusement that "we all come to it", meaning marriage. After Watson leaves, Holmes disagrees quietly, "Not all, my dear Watson... not all".

== Cast ==
- Lyn Harding as Dr. Grimesby Rylott
- Raymond Massey as Sherlock Holmes
- Angela Baddeley as Helen Stonor
- Nancy Price as Mrs. Staunton
- Athole Stewart as Dr. John Watson
- Marie Ault as Mrs Hudson
- Stanley Lathbury as Rodgers
- Charles Paton as builder
- Joyce Moore as Violet
- Ivan Brandt as Curtis

== Production ==
The film marked Raymond Massey's first credited film role and was only the third sound Sherlock Holmes film following The Return of Sherlock Holmes (1929) and The Sleeping Cardinal (1931). Using Conan Doyle's play as the source, some character names differ from the original short story; the story's Roylott becomes Rylott, Julia Stoner becomes Violet Stonor. Some characters appeared in the play and film who were not in the original story such as Mrs. Staunton the housekeeper, Rodgers the butler, and the Indian servant Ali. The film also altered the famous address of 221B Baker Street to 107 Baker Street and makes it a state-of-the-art office complete with secretaries and stenographers.

The film was shot at the Elstree Studios of British and Dominion Films outside London. The film's sets were designed by the art director Lawrence P. Williams. It was produced by Herbert Wilcox and was not part of the Sherlock Holmes series made by Twickenham Studios featuring Arthur Wontner in the title role.

== Reception ==
Film Weekly wrote: "The numerous filmgoers who delight in the wickedness of a good hearty villain will find all the entertainment they want in this adaptation of the famous Sherlock Holmes story. Lyn Harding, as the powerful Rylott, dominates the picture. He is impressive, strong in an unsubtle way, and gives a fine and convincing performance in the stage tradition."

Kine Weekly wrote: "This detective drama is not a faithful picturisation of Conan Doyle's play. Atmosphere has been partly destroyed through modernisation, and Raymond Massey is far removed from the popular conception of Sherlock Holmes. Despite this, however, the picture represents good entertainment. ... Raymond Massey gives a fairly convincing portrayal as Holmes, but is handicapped by the lack of the traditional physical attributes. Lyn Harding is a powerful and villainous Rylott, Angela Baddeley displays sound emotional ability as Helen, and Athole Stewart is a good Watson."

Vincent Starrett found Massey's performance lacking saying "Mr. Massey as Sherlock Holmes, in The Speckled Band, most famous perhaps of all the Holmes adventures, was a considerable disappointment." Starrett felt that Massey didn't at all look the part opining "he looked like almost any nice, young, brown-haired college boy, wrapped in a dormitory dressing gown, smoking a bulldog pipe."

Mordaunt Hall of The New York Times wrote: "Mr. Massey's performance is pleasing, intelligent and restrained" and said of the film "The Speckled Band succeeds in being moderately interesting."
