= Maurice Lehmann =

French actor (1895-1974)

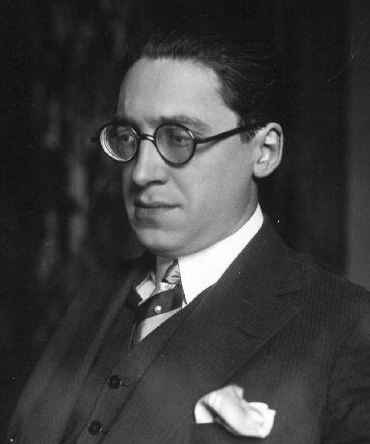
- Lehmann in 1940.
- Born: 14 May 1895; Paris, France
- Died: 17 May 1974 (aged 79); Paris, France
- Occupations: Director; actor; producer
- Years active: 1916–1958 (film)

Maurice Lehmann (14 May 1895 – 17 May 1974) was a French actor, director and producer of the stage and screen. He starred in the 1923 film Koenigsmark in which he played the title role. In 1956 he was appointed president of the jury in the Cannes Film Festival.

== Biography ==
He entered as a boarder at the Comedie-French from 1916 to 1919. He then managed theaters in the Porte Saint-Martin, the Ambigu, the Renaissance, Mogador, Edward VII and the Empire.

== Selected filmography ==
- Koenigsmark (1923)
- Pasteur (1935)
- The Gutter (1938)
- The Lady of the Camellias (1953)

== Bibliography ==
- Goble, Alan. The Complete Index to Literary Sources in Film. Walter de Gruyter, 1999.
