= Louis-Jacques Boucot =

French actor and film director

Louis-Jacques Boucot also known under the pseudonyms Louis Boucaud or Louis Boucot, (3 November 1882 in Paris – 28 March 1949 in Paris) was a 20th-century French actor and film director. He appeared in films between 1910 (Une gentille petite femme by Georges Denola) and 1938 in La Présidente by Fernand Rivers.

He also played in the series Babylas by Alfred Machin (Babylas vient d'hériter d'une panthère, Babylas explorateur, Babylas habite une maison bien tranquille and Madame Babylas aime les animaux in 1911; Babylas va se marier in 1912.)

== Filmography ==
- 1910: Une gentille petite femme by Georges Denola
- 1911: L'art de se faire aimer (anonymous)
- 1911: Babylas a hérité d'une panthère by Alfred Machin
- 1911: Babylas explorateur by Alfred Machin
- 1911: Babylas habite une maison tranquille by Alfred Machin
- 1911: Le chef de Saint-Martin (anonymous)
- 1911: La dame de compagnie by Louis Feuillade
- 1911: L'engin suspect (anonymous)
- 1911: Madame Babylas aime les animaux by Alfred Machin
- 1911: Soir de première (anonymous)
- 1911: Un ami trop entreprenant (anonymous)
- 1912: J'attend ma mère (anonymous)
- 1912: Suicide par amour (anonymous)
- 1912: Théodore n'est pas sérieux (anonymous)
- 1912: Babylas va se marier by Alfred Machin
- 1912: Les bienfaits de la culture physique (anonymous)
- 1912: Le cauchemar d'un gendre (anonymous)
- 1912: Le corsage de madame Penard (anonymous)
- 1912: La garçonnière de Monsieur Flock (anonymous)
- 1912: Madame se venge (anonymous)
- 1912: Œil pour œil (anonymous)
- 1912: Penard a trop d'enfants (anonymous)
- 1912: Penard dentiste (anonymous)
- 1912: Penard est fiancé (anonymous)
- 1912: Penard est superstitieux (anonymous)
- 1912: Penard et la femme idéale (anonymous)
- 1912: Penard et le faux Rigadin by Georges Monca
- 1912: Penard n'aime pas la poussière (anonymous)
- 1912: Penard paie son terme (anonymous)
- 1912: Penard prend un bain de pied froid (anonymous)
- 1912: Penard protège les animaux (anonymous)
- 1912: Pour sauver Madame (anonymous)
- 1913: Penard chasseur (anonymous)
- 1913: Penard escamoteur (anonymous)
- 1913: Penard et Latringle agents de police (anonymous)
- 1913: Penard et les menottes (anonymous)
- 1913: Penard veut se faire aimer (anonymous)
- 1913: Pour avoir une fille (anonymous)
- 1916: L'Hôtel du libre échange by Marcel Simon
- 1916: Paris pendant la guerre by Henri Diamant-Berger - Film in 4 tableaux -
- 1916: Vous n'avez rien à déclarer ? (anonymous)
- 1916: Dormez je le veux by Marcel Simon
- 1920: La Première Idylle de Boucot by Robert Saidreau
- 1929: Ta bouche (anonymous) - filmed song
- 1930: Chanson Bretonne (anonymous) - filmed song
- 1930: Une femme a menti by Charles de Rochefort
- 1930: Paramount on Parade by Charles de Rochefort
- 1930: Arthur or Le Culte de la beauté by Léonce Perret
- 1930: Clinique musicale (anonymous) - short film -
- 1930: Un débrouillard (anonymous) - short film -
- 1931: Le Costaud des P.T.T by Jean Bertin and Rudolph Maté
- 1931: La Terreur des Batignolles by Henri-Georges Clouzot - short film -
- 1932: La Bonne Aventure by Henri Diamant-Berger
- 1933: La Bosse des affaires by Arnaudy + Lyrics
- 1933: Incogniot / Son altesse voyage by Kurt Gerron
- 1934: Brevet 95-75 by Pierre Miquel
- 1935: La Rosière des halles by Jean de Limur
- 1935: La Coqueluche de ces dames by Gabriel Rosca
- 1936: Notre-Dame d'Amour by Pierre Caron
- 1936: Les Demi-vierges by Pierre Caron
- 1937: The Puritan by Jeff Musso - as M. Kelly
- 1938: The President by Fernand Rivers
- 1938: Three Waltzes by Ludwig Berger
