= Wedding Night =

Wedding Night may refer to:

- Wedding night
- Wedding Night (1920 film), a French silent comedy film
- Wedding Night (1935 film), a French comedy film
- Wedding Night (1947 film), a Swedish comedy film
- Wedding Night (1950 film), a French comedy film
- Wedding Night (2001 film), a Canadian comedy film
- I Can't... I Can't, released worldwide as Wedding Night, a 1970 film

== See also ==
- The Wedding Night, a 1935 American romantic drama film
