= A Gentleman of the Ring =

A Gentleman of the Ring may refer to:

- A Gentleman of the Ring (1926 film), a 1926 French silent sports film
- A Gentleman of the Ring (1932 film), a 1932 French sports film, a remake of the 1926 film
