= Mam'zelle Spahi =

1934 film

- Directed by: Max de Vaucorbeil
- Written by: Étienne Arnaud (play); André Heuzé (play); Paul Schiller
- Produced by: Fred Bacos
- Starring: Noël-Noël; Raymond Cordy; Josette Day
- Music by: Jane Bos; André Colomb
- Production company: Fox Film Europa
- Distributed by: Société Anonyme Française Fox Film
- Release date: 9 November 1934
- Running time: 75 minutes
- Country: France
- Language: French

Mam'zelle Spahi is a 1934 French comedy film directed by Max de Vaucorbeil and starring Noël-Noël, Raymond Cordy and Josette Day. It was produced and distributed by the French subsidiary of Fox Film. It was shot at the Joinville Studios of Pathé-Natan in Paris.

== Synopsis ==
Two officers serving in a regiment of Spahis discard their mistresses as they try to turn over a new, more respectable leaf. Annoyed at not being invited to a dance being held to celebrate the engagement of one of the officers to Nicole, the colonel's daughter, the two women steal Spahi uniforms from two soldiers and turn up to the party to create havoc.

== Cast ==
- Noël-Noël as Bréchu - l'ordonnance du colonel
- Raymond Cordy as Perlot - l'ordonnance du lieutenant
- Josette Day as Nicole
- Saturnin Fabre as Le colonel du 32ème de Spahis
- Mady Berry as La colonelle
- Colette Darfeuil as Aline
- Félix Oudart as Poupart - un réserviste
- Pierre Magnier as Le général
- Jean Rousselière as Le lieutenant Gilbert
- Lyne Clevers as Paulette
- Georges Bever as Malaigre
- Jeanne Byrel as Madame Poupart
- Lucien Callamand as Maître Serpolet
- Charles Camus as L'adjudant
- Nino Constantini as Le maréchal de logis
- Hubert Daix as Le gérant
- Frédérique as Madame Lubin
- René Navarre as Le major
- Henry Prestat as Le premier réserviste
- Marcel Vidal as de Vaugrineuse
- Mona Goya as Une femme au bal
- Gina Manès as Une femme au bal
- Viviane Romance as Minor Role

== Bibliography ==
- Bessy, Maurice & Chirat, Raymond. Histoire du cinéma français: 1929-1934. Pygmalion, 1988.
- Crisp, Colin. Genre, Myth and Convention in the French Cinema, 1929-1939. Indiana University Press, 2002.
- Kennedy-Karpat, Colleen. Rogues, Romance, and Exoticism in French Cinema of the 1930s. Fairleigh Dickinson, 2013.
- Rège, Philippe. Encyclopedia of French Film Directors, Volume 1. Scarecrow Press, 2009.
