= Fano Messan =

French actress, sculptor, and model

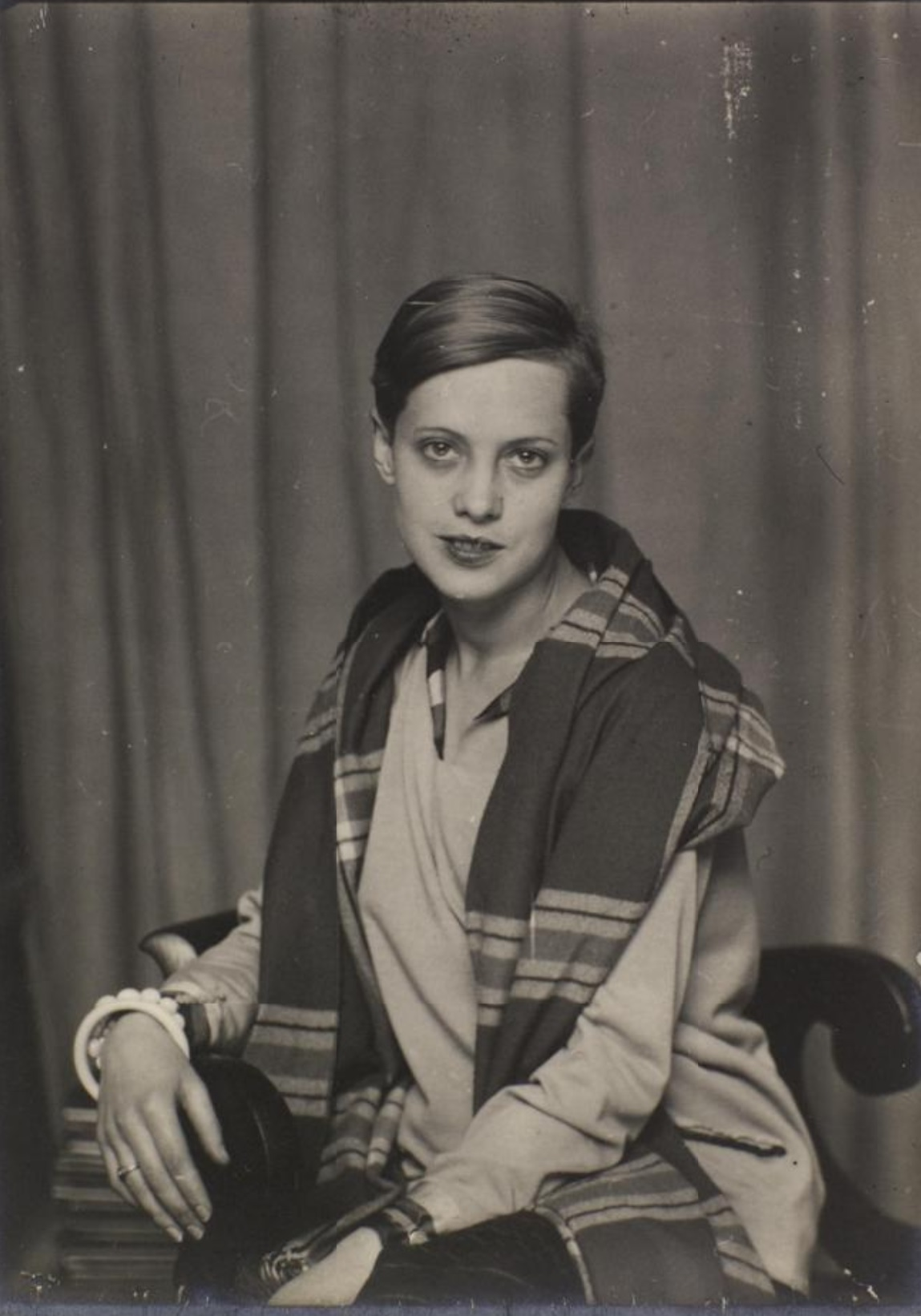
- Fano Messan by Man Ray, 1928
- Born: Fano Messan; 18 February 1902; Tarbes, France
- Died: 11 February 1998 (aged 95); Juvignac, France
- Occupation(s): Actress, sculptor, painter, model
- Years active: 1918–1930

Fano Messan (18 February 1902 – 11 February 1998) was a French actress, sculptor, painter and model known for her collaboration with artists such as Luís Buñuel, Salvador Dalí, Man Ray, Kees Van Dongen and for her participation in the Parisian cultural scene of late 20's. She is also famous for her androgyny.

== Biography ==
Fano was born in Tarbes, Hautes-Pyrénées, France, in 1902. By the age of 16 she left the École supérieure des beaux-arts de Toulouse (known from 2011 onwards as the isdaT – institut supérieur des arts et du design de Toulouse) to try her luck as a sculptor in Paris. Women were not welcome at the sculpture workshops so she did her apprenticeship by pretending to be a man, especially in the studio of Jan Martel. Messan quickly became a familiar figure throughout the nude schools, art galleries and bohemian bistros of Paris. Dressed as a man, with a very short haircut and a striking beauty, Fano honed her sculpture skills while leaving a mark on the works of the greatest artists of Montparnasse.

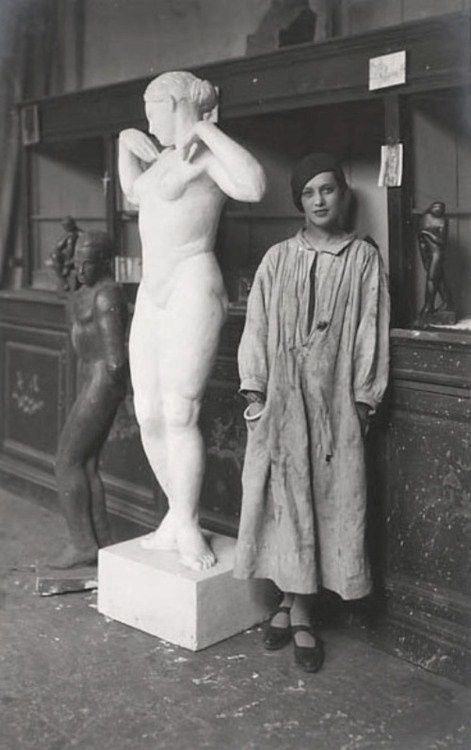
Fano Messan in Paris, 1921. Photo by Emmanuel Sougez.

In 1924 she was invited to exhibit her sculptures in Chicago, United States. The Chicago Tribune journalist, Lorimer Hammond, even wrote an article entitled "The Latin Quarter has fun trying to determine the sex of Fano Messan", in which it announces the sculptor's exhibition. The next year she showed her work at the Salon d’Automne, held on the Grand Palais. One of the most famous images of Messan was taken during that exhibition: Fano, in suit and tie, poses next to one of her "l'Androgyne" sculptures. In the independent newspaper Le Réveil du Nord she is presented as "the youngest sculptor in the world".

Fano Messan's works are imbued with sensitivity without artifice, with simple and harmonious lines. She also tames wood, stone, ivory or glass to bring her favorite subjects to life. The decorations for the Grand Cercle Casino of Aix-les-Bains and the frieze of "La danse" which used to adorn the wall of the Bal Tabarin, nudes like "l'Androgyne" series presented at the Salon of 1925, animals or figures such as those of Valéry Larbaud or Kees van Dongen who painted her portrait ("Le garçonne, Fano Messan") in exchange for the bust that she made of him in 1929, the year of his French naturalization. This portrait (which remained with Messan's family at least until 2008) shows a fragile and determined Fano, her gaze deep and distant, the slightly ajar bright red mouth defying time. The orange, green and red colors, so frequent in van Dongen work, doesn't prevent Fano's eyes from dominating the composition of the painting while contrasting with the white of the blouse. The photographin portraits of Messan taken by Man Ray (like the one taken in 1928 and acquired by the Centre Pompidou in 1994) share this characteristics of the model.

Luis Buñuel chose her to play "the androgynous girl" in the short film Un Chien Andalou (1929) after watching her play a telephone operator on 1928's feature film L'Argent, based on Émile Zola's homonymous romance. Buñuel's film was written with his then-friend Salvador Dalí, and presented a series of tenuously related scenes. Messan plays an androgynous young woman, with bobbed hair and dressed in rather masculine attire. She pokes at a severed human hand with her cane while surrounded by a large crowd held back by policemen. The crowd clears when the policeman places the hand in a striped box and gives it to the young woman. The androgynous young woman contemplates something happily while standing in the middle of the now busy street clutching the box. She is then run over by a car and a few bystanders gather around her. A young man seems to take sadistic pleasure in the androgynous young woman's danger and subsequent death, and as he gestures at the shocked young woman in the room with him, he leers at her and gropes her breasts.

The first screening of Un Chien Andalou took place at Studio des Ursulines, with an audience of le tout-Paris. Notable attendees of the première included Pablo Picasso, Le Corbusier, Jean Cocteau, Christian Bérard and Georges Auric, in addition to the entirety of André Breton's Surrealist group. The audience's positive reception of the film amazed Buñuel, who was relieved that no violence ensued. Dalí, on the contrary, was reportedly disappointed, feeling the audience's reaction made the evening "less exciting". Both of the leading actors of the film eventually committed suicide: Pierre Batcheff overdosed on Veronal on 13 April 1932, in a hotel in Paris, and Simone Mareuil committed self-immolation on 24 October 1954, by dousing herself in gasoline and burning herself to death in a public square in Périgueux, Dordogne. Fano Messan died at age 95 in Juvignac, Hérault, France.

== Filmography ==
- 1928: L'Argento as telephone operator
- 1929: Un Chien Andalou as the androgynous girl

== In other media ==
Portraits of Fano Messan
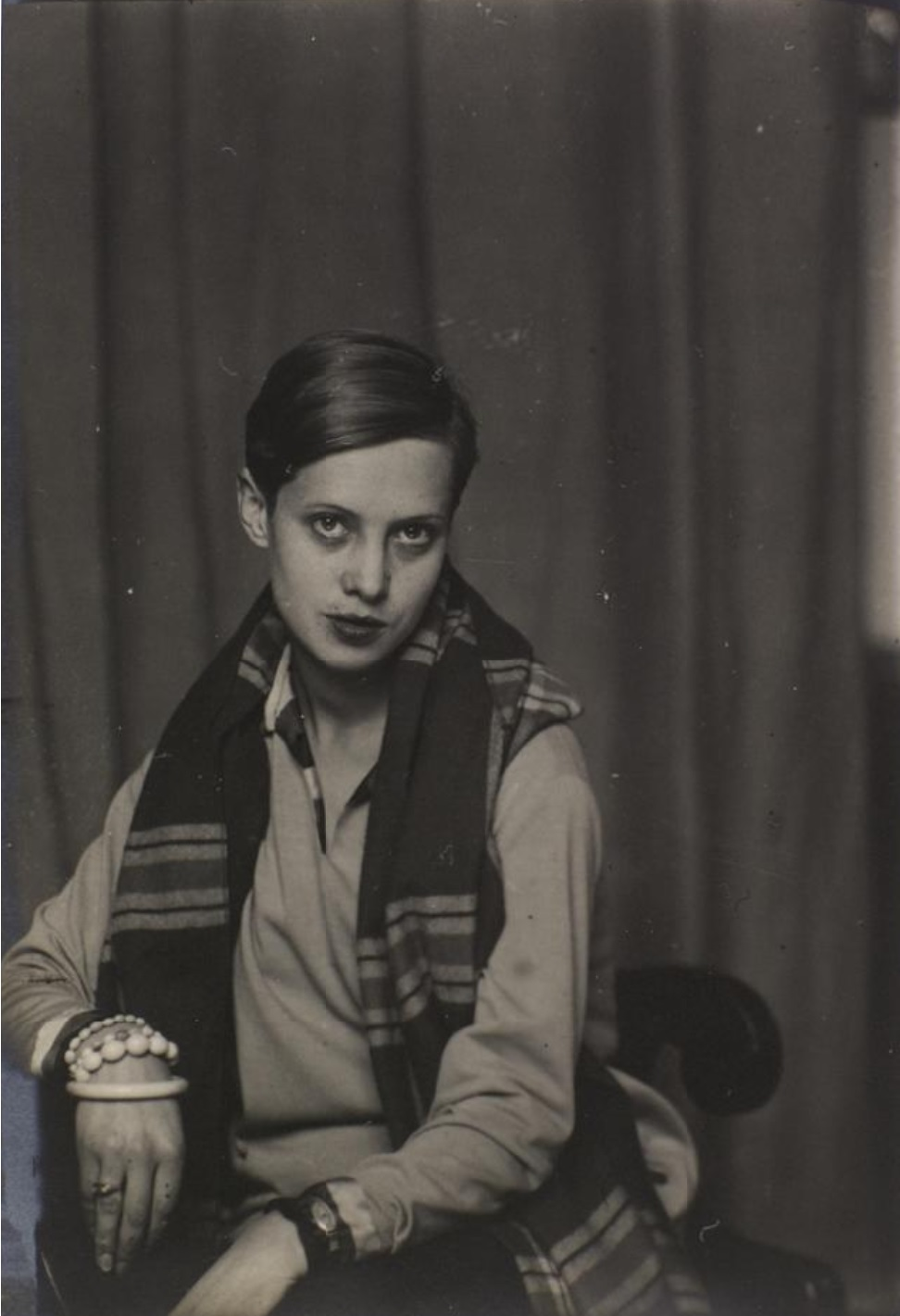
Fano Messan by Man Ray, 1928.

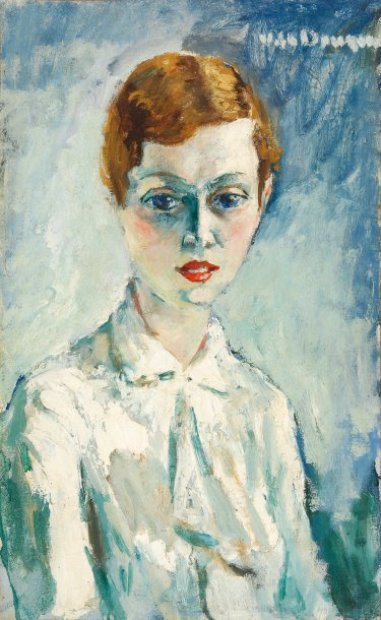
"La garçonne, Fano Messan" by Kees van Dongen, 1929

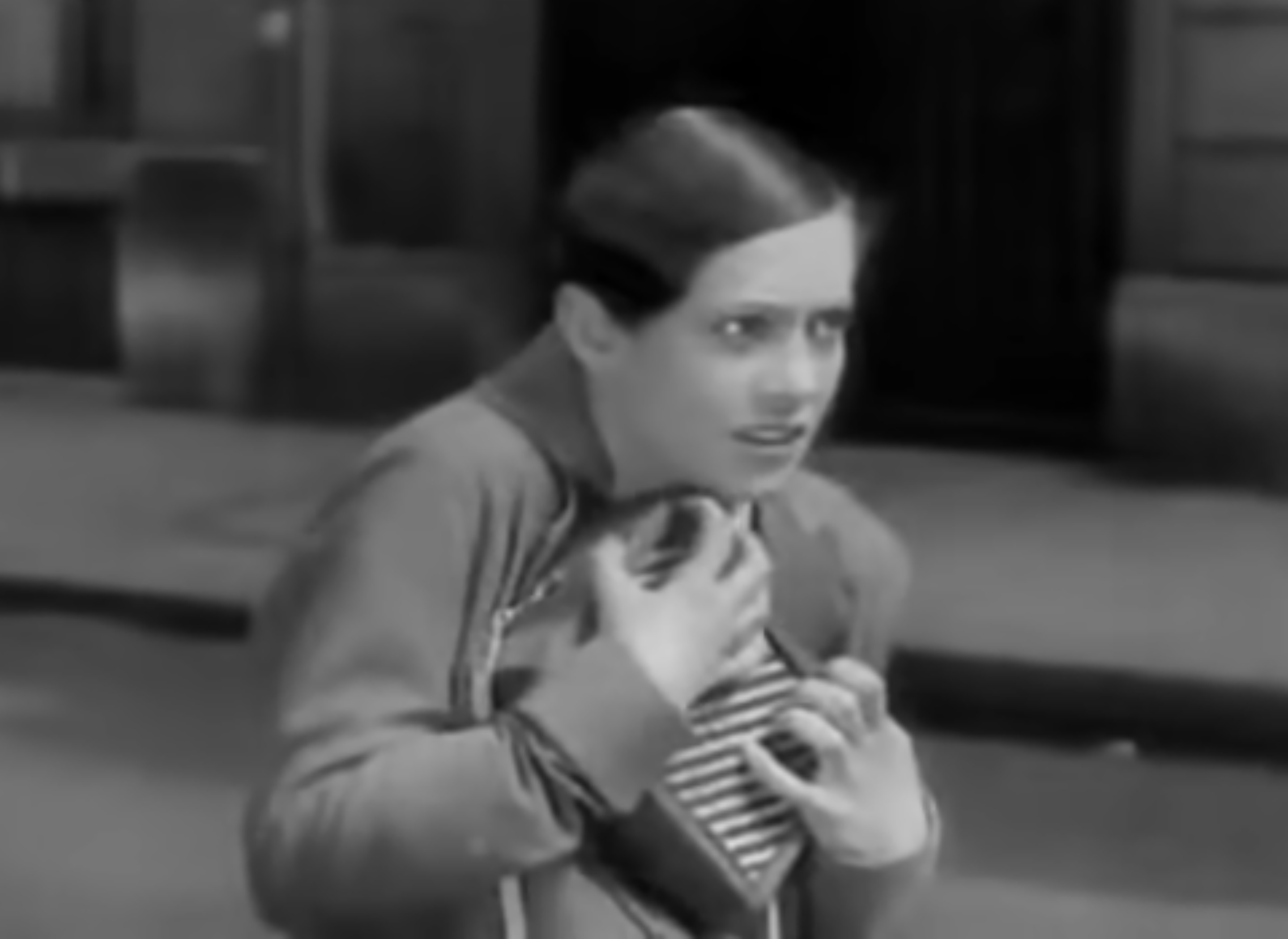
Messan acts in Un Chien Andalou (1929). Luis Buñuel.
Example 1
