= Mister Flow =

Mister Flow may refer to:

- Mister Flow (novel), a French novel by Gaston Leroux
  - Mister Flow (film), a 1936 film directed by Robert Siodmak based on the book
