= The Bride of the Regiment (1936 film) =

1936 film

- Directed by: Maurice Cammage
- Written by: Étienne Arnaud (play); Jacques Daniel-Norman; André Heuzé (play)
- Produced by: Maurice Cammage
- Starring: Pierre Larquey; Suzanne Dehelly; Gaby Basset
- Cinematography: Georges Clerc
- Music by: René Mercier
- Production company: Les Films Minerva
- Distributed by: Les Films Minerva
- Release date: 3 January 1936
- Running time: 90 minutes
- Country: France
- Language: French

The Bride of the Regiment (French: La mariée du régiment) is a 1936 French comedy film directed by Maurice Cammage and starring Pierre Larquey, Suzanne Dehelly and Gaby Basset. It was based on a play by Étienne Arnaud and André Heuzé. The film's sets were designed by the art director Robert Saurin.

== Synopsis ==
Private Mamert is the heir to a very large sum of money. His fellow soldiers all pretend to be him to make their conquests amongst the local woman. This leads to several complaints to the Colonel about his misbehaviour and failure to honour his promises of marriage.

== Cast ==
- Pierre Larquey
- Suzanne Dehelly
- Gaby Basset
- Lyne Clevers
- Jean Dunot
- André Roanne
- André Berley

== Bibliography ==
- Bessy, Maurice & Chirat, Raymond. Histoire du cinéma français: encyclopédie des films, Volume 2. Pygmalion, 1986.
- Crisp, Colin. Genre, Myth and Convention in the French Cinema, 1929-1939. Indiana University Press, 2002.
- Rège, Philippe. Encyclopedia of French Film Directors, Volume 1. Scarecrow Press, 2009.
