= Floretta and Patapon =

Floretta and Patapon (Italian:Florette e Patapon) may refer to:

- Floretta and Patapon (1913 film), an Italian silent film
- Floretta and Patapon (1927 film), an Italian silent film
