= Ilona Kökény =

Hungarian actress (1891–1947)

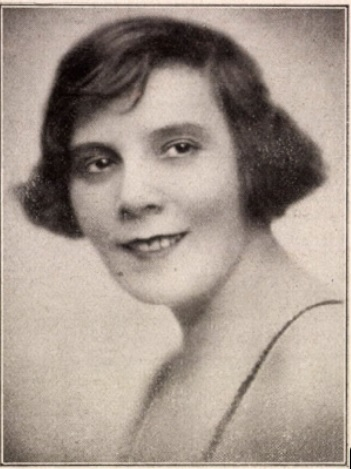
- Kökény in 1929
- Born: 7 April 1891; Gyula, Hungary
- Died: 1 July 1947 (aged 56); Budapest, Hungary
- Occupation: Actress
- Years active: 1918–1944

Ilona Kökény (7 April 1891 – 1 July 1947) was a Hungarian actress. She appeared in more than forty films from 1918 to 1944.

== Selected filmography ==
Year	Title	Role	Notes
1937	Lady Seeks a Room	llka	
1937	Tales of Budapest	Vevõ	
1939	The Perfect Man	Csatáryné	
1940	The Bercsenyi Hussars	Róza néni	
1943	Happy Times	Hölgy	
