= All That's Not Worth Love =

1931 film

- Directed by: Jacques Tourneur
- Written by: René Pujol
- Produced by: Bernard Natan; Emile Natan
- Starring: Marcel Lévesque; Jean Gabin; Josseline Gaël
- Cinematography: Henri Barreyre; Nicolas Bourgassoff
- Music by: Hugo Hirsch
- Production company: Pathé-Natan
- Distributed by: Pathé-Natan
- Release date: 16 October 1931
- Running time: 87 minutes
- Country: France
- Language: French

All That's Not Worth Love (French: Tout ça ne vaut pas l'amour) is a 1931 French comedy drama film directed by Jacques Tourneur in his directorial debut and starring Marcel Lévesque, Jean Gabin and Josseline Gaël. It was shot at Pathé's Joinville Studios in Paris. The film's sets were designed by the art director Lucien Aguettand.

== Synopsis ==
A pharmacist who up to this point has only ever shown an interest in stamp collecting gives shelter to a poor young woman and falls in love with her. However she is more interested in the salesman in the shop next door.

== Cast ==
- Marcel Lévesque as Jules Renaudin
- Jean Gabin as Jean Cordier
- Josseline Gaël as Claire
- Mady Berry as Madame Cordier
- Jane Loury as Léonie
- Delphine Abdala as Madame Triron
- Anthony Gildès as Le tailleur
- Léon Larive as Le client de la pharmacie
- Gilberte Savary as La petite fille

== Bibliography ==
- Harriss, Joseph. Jean Gabin: The Actor Who Was France. McFarland, 2018.
