= Charlotte Lysès =

French actress (1877–1956)

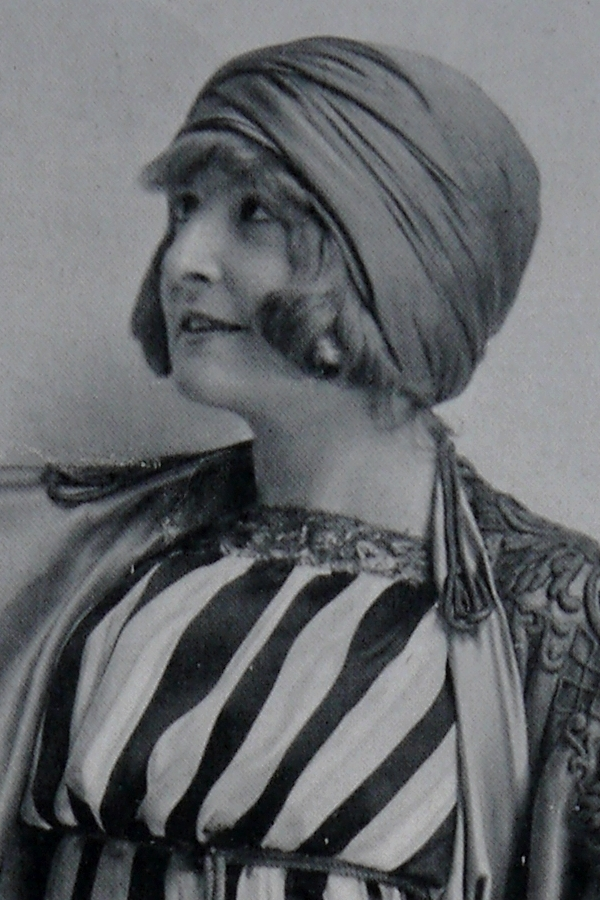
- Lysès in 1910
- Born: 17 May 1877; Paris, France
- Died: 7 April 1956 (aged 78); Saint-Jean-Cap-Ferrat, Alpes-Maritimes, France
- Occupation: Actress
- Years active: 1933–1942 (film)

Charlotte Lysès (17 May 1877 – 7 April 1956) was a French stage and film actress.

== Selected filmography ==
- The Heir of the Bal Tabarin (1933)
- One Night's Song (1933)
- La dame de chez Maxim's (1933)
- The Rosary (1934)
- The Last Waltz (1936)
- The Brighton Twins (1936)
- Love Marriage (1942)
- Return to Happiness (1942)
- Colonel Pontcarral (1942)

== Bibliography ==
- Capua, Michelangelo. Anatole Litvak: The Life and Films. McFarland, 2015.
