= The Path of Honour =

1939 film

- Directed by: Jean-Paul Paulin
- Written by: Jan Rentès
- Produced by: Henri Garat
- Starring: Henri Garat; Renée Saint-Cyr; André Lefaur
- Cinematography: René Guissart
- Edited by: André Versein
- Music by: Georges Van Parys
- Production company: Les Productions Henry Garat
- Distributed by: Les Productions Henry Garat
- Release date: 15 December 1939
- Running time: 105 minutes
- Country: France
- Language: French

The Path of Honour (French: Le chemin de l'honneur) is a 1939 French drama film directed by Jean-Paul Paulin and starring Henri Garat, Renée Saint-Cyr and André Lefaur. The film's sets were designed by the art director Lucien Aguettand.

== Synopsis ==
Two twin brothers of different tempremants are members of the French Army. Paul is a lieutenant in the Spahis while his brother Georges enlisted in the Foreign Legion to escape the police. However the authorities get word of his presence and he deserts to avoid arrest. In Casablanca his brother agrees to take his place for a while, giving Georges time to redeem his honour.

== Cast ==
- Henri Garat as Paul Imbert / Georges Imbert
- Renée Saint-Cyr as Renée de Marvilliers
- André Lefaur as Le général de Puy d'Arc
- Roland Toutain as Le lieutenant Péresc
- Constant Rémy as Le colonel
- Jean-Louis Allibert as Un Officier
- René Bergeron as L'inspecteur Bicherel
- Mady Berry as La patronne de l'hôtel
- Pierre Brasseur as Philippe
- Rivers Cadet as Antoine
- Fernand Charpin as Le parrain
- Eddy Debray as Le Curé
- Paul Escoffier as Le chef de la police judiciaire
- Jeanne Fusier-Gir as Augustine - la bonne
- Lucas Gridoux as La Quinine
- Marcelle Géniat as Mme Imbert
- Georges Paulais as Le Chirurgien
- Philippe Richard as Le Major

== Bibliography ==
- Bessy, Maurice & Chirat, Raymond. Histoire du cinéma français: 1935-1939. Pygmalion, 1986.
- Crisp, Colin. Genre, Myth and Convention in the French Cinema, 1929-1939. Indiana University Press, 2002.
- Rège, Philippe. Encyclopedia of French Film Directors, Volume 1. Scarecrow Press, 2009.
