= Behind the Facade =

1939 film

- Directed by: Georges Lacombe; Yves Mirande
- Written by: Max Kolpé; Georges Lacombe; Yves Mirande
- Produced by: Arys Nissotti; Pierre O'Connell
- Starring: Lucien Baroux; Jules Berry; André Lefaur
- Cinematography: Victor Arménise; Robert Juillard
- Edited by: Marthe Poncin
- Music by: André Gailhard
- Production company: Régina Films
- Distributed by: Regina Distribution (France); ENIC (Italy)
- Release date: 14 March 1939
- Running time: 85 minutes
- Country: France
- Language: French

Behind the Facade (French: Derrière la façade) is a 1939 French drama film directed by Georges Lacombe and Yves Mirande and starring Lucien Baroux, Jules Berry and André Lefaur. The film's sets were designed by the art director Lucien Aguettand. It was shot at the Epinay Studios in Paris.

== Synopsis ==
When the owner of an apartment block is found murdered, two policeman investigate the lives of the various tenants who live there.

== Cast ==
- Lucien Baroux as Le commissaire Boucheron
- Jules Berry as Alfrédo D'Avila
- André Lefaur as Corbeau
- Gaby Morlay as Gaby
- Elvire Popesco as Madame Rameau
- Michel Simon as Picking
- Betty Stockfeld as L'anglaise
- Erich von Stroheim as Eric
- Simone Berriau as Lydia
- Missia as Joséphine Picking
- Raymond Segard as Robert Bernier
- Marcel Orluc as Gérard Bernier
- Jean Daurand as Le télégraphiste
- Elmire Vautier as Marie, l'habilleuse de Lydia
- Lina Darwils as Une locataire
- Robert Ozanne as Le brigadier
- Claude Sainval as Le gigolo de Gaby
- Raymone as La bonne de Madame Mathieu
- Jean Joffre as Monsieur Martin, l'aveugle
- Lise Courbet as Paulette
- Andrex as André Laurent, l'employé de banque
- Julien Carette as Le soldat
- Aimé Clariond as Le président Bernier
- Jacques Dumesnil as Albert Durant, le jouer de poker
- Paul Faivre as Le concierge
- Marcel Simon as Jules, l'amant de Gaby
- Gaby Sylvia as Madeleine Martin
- Gabrielle Dorziat as Madame Bernier
- Jacques Baumer as Lambert
- Marguerite Moreno as La sous-directrice
- Georges Bever as Un chauffeur de taxi
- Rivers Cadet as Un agent
- Roger Doucet
- Hélène Flouest
- Georges Malkine as Un chauffeur de taxi
- Franck Maurice as Un agent
- Yves Mirande as Le clochard sur le banc
- Robert Moor as Un agent
- Henri Nassiet as Petit rôle
- Jean Wiener

== Bibliography ==
- Aitken, Ian. The Concise Routledge Encyclopedia of the Documentary Film. Routledge, 2013.
