= The Chocolate Girl (1927 film) =

1927 film

- Directed by: René Hervil
- Based on: The Chocolate Girl by Paul Gavault
- Produced by: Louis Nalpas
- Starring: Dolly Davis; Simone Mareuil; Luitz-Morat
- Cinematography: Marcel Grimault; Georges Lafont
- Production companies: Films de France; Société des Cinéromans
- Distributed by: Pathé Consortium Cinéma
- Release date: 16 December 1927
- Country: France
- Languages: Silent; French intertitles

The Chocolate Girl (French: La petite chocolatière) is a 1927 French silent comedy film directed by René Hervil and starring Dolly Davis, Simone Mareuil and Luitz-Morat. It is based on the play of the same name by Paul Gavault, which has been made into several films.

== Cast ==
- Dolly Davis as Benjamine Lapistolle
- Simone Mareuil as Rosette
- Luitz-Morat as Félicien Bedarride
- André Roanne as Paul Normand
- André Nicolle as Lapistolle - un riche chocolatier
- Madame Pawloff as Florise Mingassol
- Nita Alvarez
- Ernest Maupain as Mingassol

== Bibliography ==
- Philippe Rège. Encyclopedia of French Film Directors, Volume 1. Scarecrow Press, 2009.
