= The Heir of the Bal Tabarin =

1933 film

- Directed by: Jean Kemm
- Written by: Jean-Louis Bouquet
- Based on: The Heir of the Bal Tabarin by André Mouëzy-Éon and Nicolas Nancey
- Produced by: Alex Nalpas
- Starring: Frédéric Duvallès; Charlotte Lysès; Germaine Michel
- Cinematography: René Guichard; Maurice Guillemin
- Edited by: Jean Lecocq
- Music by: Lucien Wurmser; Jean Yatove
- Production company: Les Films Alex Nalpas
- Distributed by: Les Films Alex Nalpas
- Release date: 20 October 1933
- Running time: 85 minutes
- Country: France
- Language: French

The Heir of the Bal Tabarin (French: L'héritier du Bal Tabarin) is a 1933 French comedy film directed by Jean Kemm and starring Frédéric Duvallès, Charlotte Lysès and Germaine Michel. It was based on the 1919 stage farce of the same title by André Mouëzy-Éon and Nicolas Nancey. It was shot at the Joinville Studios of Pathé-Natan. The film's sets were designed by the art director Jacques Colombier.

== Synopsis ==
A prudish man unexpectedly inherits the Bal Tabarin cabaret in Paris. According to the terms of the will he must manage it himself, something he conceals from his family.

== Cast ==
- Frédéric Duvallès as Longuebois
- Charlotte Lysès as La tante à héritage
- Germaine Michel as Madame Longuebois
- Marcel Lévesque as Pépin-Mounette
- Robert Pizani as Le danseur
- Robert Mérin as Le neveu
- Simone Mareuil as Mademoiselle Longuebois
- Monette Dinay as Chiquette
- Jeanne Fusier-Gir as La boniche
- Armand Lurville as Le notaire

== Bibliography ==
- Bessy, Maurice & Chirat, Raymond. Histoire du cinéma français: 1929-1934. Pygmalion, 1988.
- Crisp, Colin. Genre, Myth and Convention in the French Cinema, 1929-1939. Indiana University Press, 2002.
- Rège, Philippe. Encyclopedia of French Film Directors, Volume 1. Scarecrow Press, 2009.
