= Star Without Light (1946 film) =

- Directed by: Marcel Blistène
- Written by: André-Paul Antoine; Marcel Blistène
- Produced by: Eugène Tucherer
- Starring: Édith Piaf; Marcel Herrand; Jules Berry
- Cinematography: Paul Cotteret
- Edited by: Ginou Bretoneiche
- Music by: Guy Luypaerts
- Production company: Société Universelle de Films
- Distributed by: Société Universelle de Films
- Release date: 3 April 1946
- Running time: 88 minutes
- Country: France
- Language: French

Star Without Light (French: Étoile sans lumière) is a 1946 French drama film directed by Marcel Blistène and starring Édith Piaf, Marcel Herrand and Jules Berry. It was shot at the Francoeur Studios in Paris. The film's sets were designed by the art director Jean d'Eaubonne. The film is set in 1929.

== Main cast ==
- Édith Piaf as Madeleine
- Marcel Herrand as Roger Marney
- Jules Berry as Billy Daniel
- Serge Reggiani as Gaston Lansac
- Mila Parély as Stella Dora
- Yves Montand as Pierre
- Colette Brosset as Lulu
- Renée Dennsy as La script-girl
- Jean Raymond as Paul
- Pierre Farny
- Paul Frankeur as Le reporter
- Pierre Mindaist
- Ginette Cantrin
- Juliette Cransac
- Georges Yvon
- Jean Rozemberg
- Georges Vitray as Le producteur Darnois
- Mady Berry as Mélanie

== Bibliography ==
- Gorlinski, Gini. The 100 Most Influential Musicians of All Time. Britannica Educational Publishing, 2009.
