= The Call Box Mystery =

1932 British film by G.B. Samuelson

- Trade show advertisement
- Directed by: G. B. Samuelson
- Written by: Joan Morgan
- Produced by: Edward Gordon Craig
- Starring: Warwick Ward; Harold French; Wendy Barrie
- Cinematography: Desmond Dickinson
- Production company: G. B. Samuelson Productions
- Distributed by: United Artists
- Release date: March 1932
- Running time: 73 minutes
- Country: United Kingdom
- Language: English

The Call Box Mystery (also known as The Callbox Mystery) is a 1932 British crime film directed by G.B. Samuelson and starring Warwick Ward, Harold French and Wendy Barrie. It was written by Joan Morgan (as Joan Wentworth-Wood), and was made at Cricklewood Studios as a quota quickie.

== Preservation status ==
The British Film Institute National Archive holds a collection of stills but no film or video materials.

== Plot ==
Inspector Layton of Scotland Yard is investigating the suspicious death of Mr. Banner. Banner's daughter, Iris, tells Layton that her brother David, a musician, had gone missing after becoming a protégé of Leo Mount, a millionaire interested in music, and suspected of being linked to blackmailers. Subsequently, a number of artists with connectons to Mount die in mysterious circumstances. Layton investigates these and is ultimately able to solve the mystery of Barner's death, and win Iris's love.

== Cast ==
- Warwick Ward as Leo Mount
- Harold French as Inspector Layton
- Wendy Barrie as Iris Banner
- Gerald Rawlinson as David Radnor
- Harvey Braban as Inspector Brown
- Daphne Mowbray as Rose
- Tom Shenton as Pearce
- Myno Burney as Paul Grayle

== Reception ==
Kine Weekly wrote: "Amateurish murder mystery drama, so loosely constructed that it fails to hold the interest, let alone thrill. The cast do their best in the circumstances, but the fantastic story and poor direction defeat them. Quota booking for very unsophisticated audiences."

Picturegoer wrote: "Incredible and loosely constructed detective story which fails to hold the interest. The artists do their best, but the material defeats them and, as a whole, they only succeed in giving very average performances. Too much time is wasted in dealing with side-issues, so that the main facts become obscured and, instead of being thrilled, one becomes distinctly bored."
