= Frontier Rangers =

1960 film

- Directed by: Jacques Tourneur
- Starring: Buddy Ebsen; Don Burnett
- Cinematography: William W. Spencer; Harold E. Wellman
- Edited by: Ira Heymann; Frank Santillo
- Music by: Raoul Kraushaar
- Distributed by: Metro-Goldwyn-Mayer
- Release date: 1959
- Running time: 83 minutes
- Country: United States
- Language: English
- Budget: $74,000
- Box office: $650,000

Frontier Rangers is a 1959 film composed of 3 episodes of the TV series Northwest Passage: The Gunsmith, The Bond Women, and The Burning Village (83 mn) (1959).

The film focuses on Major Robert Rogers along with his two other Rangers who were hunting a French and Indian War Spy.

== Reception ==
According to MGM records the movie earned $650,000 outside the US and Canada resulting in a profit of $159,000.

== See also ==
- List of American films of 1959
