= Germaine Michel =

French actress (1892–1976)

- Born: 7 November 1892; Paris, France
- Died: 9 January 1976 (aged 83); Clichy-la-Garenne, France
- Occupation: Actor
- Years active: 1913-1965

Germaine Michel (7 November 1892 – 9 January 1976) was a French stage and film actress. She was born in Paris and died in Clichy-la-Garenne.

== Career ==
She initiated her career in theater before transitioning to film, which significantly boosted her popularity.

Germaine Michel worked steadily through the 1930s and 1940s, acting in a variety of dramas, comedies, and crime thrillers. She captivated audiences with her beauty, grace, and emotional depth in every role she played. Despite her versatility as an actress, Germaine is most notable for her roles in French noir films. The actress often played complex and conflicted characters, adding depth and realism to each role.

Some of Germaine Michel's most acclaimed films include The Strange Monsieur Victor (1938), "La Nuit Fantastique" (1942), and "Cigarette Girl" (1947). Her performances in these films received critical recognition, establishing her as one of the top actresses of her time.

Germaine Michel retired from acting in the 1950s but continued to receive accolades for her contributions to French cinema. In 1974, she was awarded the French Order of Merit for her outstanding dedication to the arts.

== Selected filmography ==
- The Wandering Beast (1932)
- Cognasse (1932)
- Make-Up (1932)
- Paprika (1933)
- The Heir of the Bal Tabarin (1933)
- On the Streets (1933)
- 600,000 Francs a Month (1933)
- Rothchild (1934)
- Chourinette (1934)
- Tovaritch (1935)
- Mercadet (1936)
- The Man of the Hour (1937)
- Three Waltzes (1938)
- That's Sport (1938)
- The Porter from Maxim's (1939)
- As Long as I Live (1946)
- Special Mission (1946)
- Pastoral Symphony (1946)
- To the Eyes of Memory (1948)
- The Cupid Club (1949)
- The Mystery of the Yellow Room (1949)
- At the Grand Balcony (1949)
- Three Telegrams (1950)
- Gas-Oil (1955)
- The Little Rebels (1955)
- Maigret Sets a Trap (1958)
