= Mady Berry =

French actress (1887–1965)

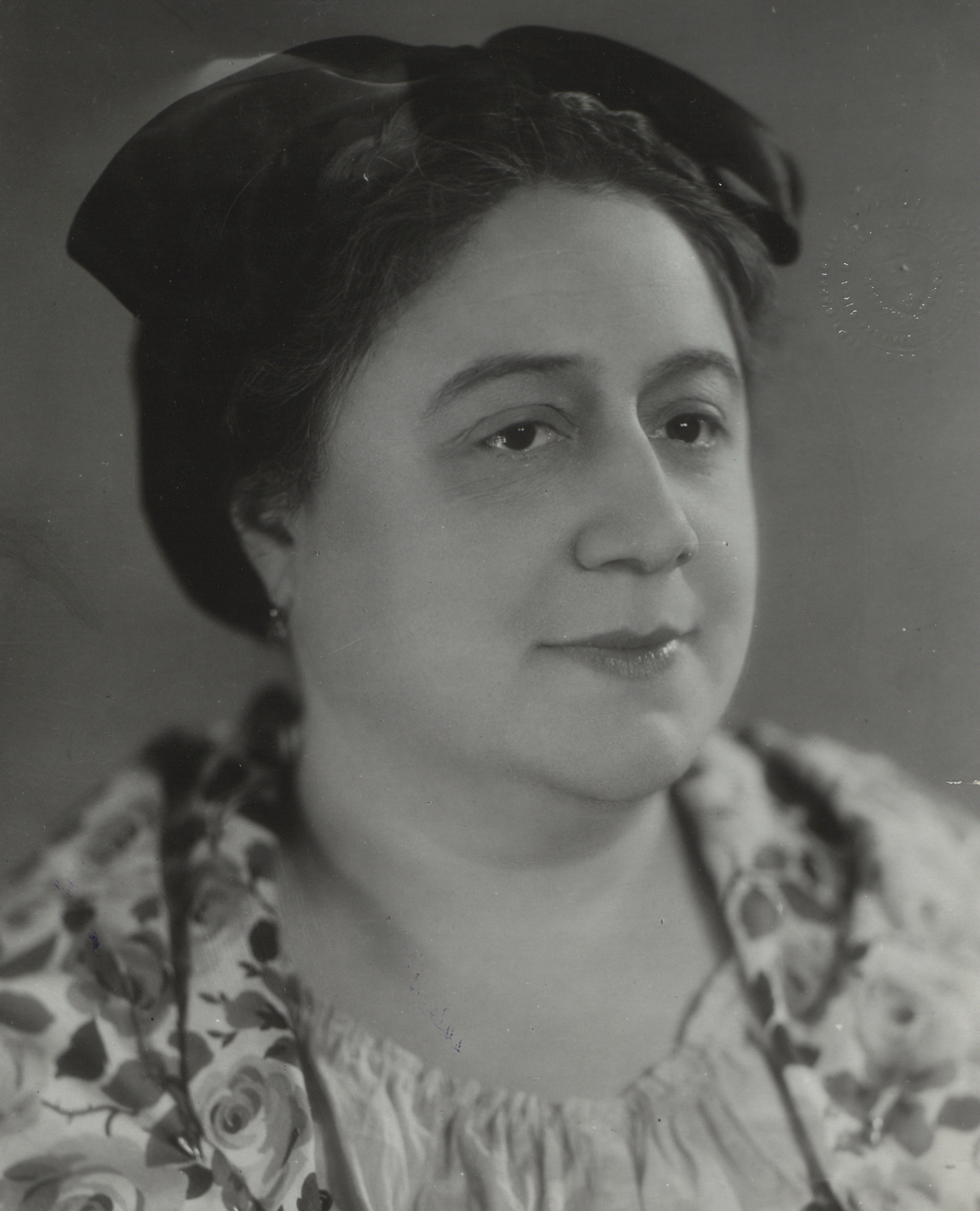
- Born: 14 October 1887; Berck, Pas-de-Calais, France
- Died: 18 January 1965 (aged 77); Paris, France
- Other name: Madeleine Van Blitz
- Occupation: Actress
- Years active: 1930-1960 (film)

Mady Berry (14 October 1887 – 18 January 1965) was a French stage and film actress.

== Selected filmography ==
- Gloria (1931)
- All That's Not Worth Love (1931)
- Moon Over Morocco (1931)
- The Girl and the Boy (1931)
- The Polish Jew (1931)
- Durand Versus Durand (1931)
- Amourous Adventure (1932)
- Fun in the Barracks (1932)
- Our Lord's Vineyard (1932)
- Children of Montmartre (1933)
- The Crime of Bouif (1933)
- The Invisible Woman (1933)
- The Scandal (1934)
- The Typist Gets Married (1934)
- Mam'zelle Spahi (1934)
- At the End of the World (1934)
- The Dying Land (1936)
- Girls of Paris (1936)
- The Flame (1936)
- The Citadel of Silence (1937)
- Madelon's Daughter (1937)
- Arsene Lupin, Detective (1937)
- The Ladies in the Green Hats (1937)
- White Cargo (1937)
- Blanchette (1937)
- Rasputin (1938)
- The Two Schemers (1938)
- Véréna's Wedding (1938)
- Troubled Heart (1938)
- The Innocent (1938)
- The Puritan (1938)
- The Mayor's Dilemma (1939)
- Immediate Call (1939)
- The Path of Honour (1939)
- The World Will Tremble (1939)
- Prince Bouboule (1939)
- Personal Column (1939)
- There's No Tomorrow (1939)
- Radio Surprises (1940)
- Six Little Girls in White (1942)
- Twilight (1944)
- Star Without Light (1946)
- Gates of the Night (1946)
- The Angel They Gave Me (1946)
- The Eleven O'Clock Woman (1948)
- Clochemerle (1948)
- A Change in the Wind (1949)
- One Only Loves Once (1950)
- Vendetta in Camargue (1950)
- Monsieur Octave (1951)
- My Husband Is Marvelous (1952)
- A Caprice of Darling Caroline (1953)
- The Ostrich Has Two Eggs (1957)

== Bibliography ==
- Waldman, Harry. Maurice Tourneur: The Life and Films. McFarland, 2001.
