= The Puritan (film) =

1938 film

- Directed by: Jeff Musso
- Written by: Liam O'Flaherty (novel); Jeff Musso; Jeannine Delpech; Louis Postif
- Produced by: Jeff Musso
- Starring: Pierre Fresnay; Jean-Louis Barrault; Viviane Romance
- Cinematography: Charles Bauer; Curt Courant
- Edited by: Émilienne Nelissen
- Music by: Jacques Belasco; Jeff Musso
- Production company: Derby Films
- Distributed by: Consortium du Film
- Release date: 13 January 1938
- Running time: 85 minutes
- Country: France
- Language: French

The Puritan (French: Le puritain) is a 1938 French crime film directed by Jeff Musso and starring Pierre Fresnay, Jean-Louis Barrault and Viviane Romance.

The film's art direction was by Henri Ménessier and Serge Piménoff.

== Cast ==
- Pierre Fresnay as Le commissaire Lavan
- Jean-Louis Barrault as Francis Ferriter
- Viviane Romance as Molly
- Louis-Jacques Boucot as Monsieur Kelly
- Mady Berry as Madame Kelly
- Alexandre Rignault as Le docteur O'Leary
- Fréhel
- Ludmilla Pitoëff as La tante de Thérésa
- Alla Donell as Thérésa Burke
- Rosita Montenegro
- Marcel Vallée
- Georges Flamant as Callaghan
- Pedro Elviro as Un agent de la Sûreté
- Charblay
- Jean Tissier
- Léon Bary
- Pierre Labry
- Marcel Delaître as Le prêtre
- Marthe Mellot as Madame Ferriter
- Geneviève Sorya as La gourgandine
- Edmond Van Daële
- Paul Asselin
- Maurice Maillot

== Bibliography ==
- Alfred Krautz. International directory of cinematographers set- and costume designers in film. Saur, 1983.
- Gilligan, Paula (1998). "Banned Text/Censored Images: The Avant-Garde as Resistance in Jeff Musso's Le Puritain". Interfaces. Image-Texte-Langage (14): 231–243. doi:10.3406/inter.1998.1154.
