= Irène Zilahy =

Hungarian actress (1904–1944)

Iréne Zilahy
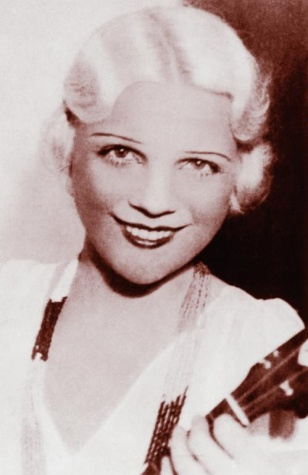
- Born: Irén Mária Gajdzinszky; 10 August 1904; Kaposvár, Hungary
- Died: 4 April 1944 (aged 39); Budapest, Hungary
- Occupation: Actress

Irène Zilahy (born Irén Mária Gajdzinszky; 10 August 1904 – 4 April 1944) was a Hungarian actress. She was born in Kaposvár, Hungary and died during the Siege of Budapest. She appeared in both Hungarian and French films during her career.

== Selected filmography ==
- Paprika (1933)
- Tovaritch (1935)
- Csardas (1935)
- Lady Seeks a Room (1937)
- Prince Bouboule (1939)
