= Shot in the Night =

1943 film

- Directed by: Robert Péguy
- Written by: Robert Coulom
- Based on: L'Avocat by Eugène Brieux
- Produced by: Fernand Rivers
- Starring: Henri Rollan; Jean Debucourt; Raymond Aimos
- Cinematography: Georges Million
- Edited by: Madeleine Gug
- Music by: Henri Verdun
- Production company: Les Films Fernand Rivers
- Distributed by: Ciné Sélection
- Release date: 3 March 1943
- Running time: 87 minutes
- Country: France
- Language: French

Shot in the Night (French: Coup de feu dans la nuit, pronounced [ku də fø dɑ̃ la nɥi]) is a 1943 French crime drama film directed by Robert Péguy and starring Mary Morgan, Henri Rollan, Jean Debucourt and Raymond Aimos. It is based on the 1922 play L'Avocat by Eugène Brieux. The film's sets were designed by the art director Marcel Mary.

== Synopsis ==
An attractive young wife, unhappily married to a domineering husband, is suspected of his murder after he is discovered shot dead one night outside his country house. She is defended in court by an old friend whom she has secretly loved for many years.

== Cast ==
- Mary Morgan as Lise du Coudrais
- Henri Rollan as Maître Martigny
- Jean Debucourt as Le juge d'instruction
- Raymond Aimos as Fortin – Le greffier
- Nane Germon as Pauline
- Charles Lemontier as Arnaud
- Monette Dinay as Toinette
- Jeanne Marie-Laurent as Madame Martigny mère
- Coutan-Lambert as Madame du Coudrais
- Solange Varenne as Marton
- Jeanne Stora as Mademoiselle du Coudrais
- Lise Donat as La cabaretière
- Jacques Grétillat as Monsieur du Coudrais
- Jean Meyer as Le baron
- Guy Parzy as Claude Lemercier
- Robert Allard as Billaud
- Jean-Louis Allibert as Un avocat
- Maurice Dorléac as Fronsac
- Marcel Vibert as L'avocat général
- André Carnège as Le président des Assises
- Marcel Pérès as Un contrebandier
- Rivers Cadet as Un contrebandier

== Bibliography ==
- Bessy, Maurice; Chirat, Raymond. Histoire du cinéma français: encyclopédie des films, 1940–1950. Pygmalion, 1986
- Burch, Noël; Sellier, Geneviève. The Battle of the Sexes in French Cinema, 1930–1956. Duke University Press, 2013.
- Rège, Philippe. Encyclopedia of French Film Directors, Volume 1. Scarecrow Press, 2009.
