= La dame de chez Maxim's (1933 film) =

1933 British film by Alexander Korda

- Release date: 1933
- Country: United Kingdom
- Language: French

La dame de chez Maxim's (transl.The Girl from Maxim's) is a 1933 British French-language comedy film directed by Alexander Korda and starring Florelle, Esther Kiss and Ady Cresso. The film is a French-language version of the 1933 film The Girl from Maxim's made by London Film Productions. Both films were directed by Korda, and were based on the 1899 farce La Dame de chez Maxim by Georges Feydeau.

== Cast ==
- Florelle - La Môme Crevette
- Esther Kiss - Eléonore
- Ady Cresso - Mme Virette
- Jeanne Frédérique - La sous-préfète
- Maryanne - Mme Vibaudan
- Charlotte Lysès - Gabrielle Petypon - la femme de Lucien
- André Lefaur - Le général Petypon du Grêlé
- André Alerme - Le docteur Lucien Petypon
- Pierre Palau - Le docteur Mongicourt
- Maurice Rémy - Le lieutenant Corignon
- Marcel Meral - Le duc
- Henri Debain - Etienne
- Marcel Maupi - Le sous-préfet
- Jean Delmour - Marollier
- Félix Mayol - L'évêque
- Madeleine Ozeray - Clémentine
- Marguerite de Morlaye - La duchesse
- Jane de Carol - Une invitée
- Louis Pré Fils - Emile
- Beauvais - Un maître d'hôtel

== See also ==
- Maxim's

== Bibliography ==
- Kulik, Karol. Alexander Korda: The Man Who Could Work Miracles. Virgin Books, 1990.
