= The Polish Jew (film) =

1931 film

- Directed by: Jean Kemm
- Written by: Pierre Maudru
- Based on: The Bells by Alexandre Chatrian and Emile Erckmann
- Starring: Harry Baur; Mady Berry; Simone Mareuil
- Cinematography: Paul Cotteret; Robert Lefebvre
- Edited by: Henriette Wurtzer
- Music by: Pierre Maudru; André Sablon
- Production company: Établissements Jacques Haïk
- Distributed by: Établissements Jacques Haïk
- Release date: 18 September 1931
- Running time: 85 minutes
- Country: France
- Language: French

The Polish Jew (French: Le Juif polonais) is a 1931 French historical drama film directed by Jean Kemm and starring Harry Baur, Mady Berry and Simone Mareuil. It is based on the 1867 play The Bells by Alexandre Chatrian and Emile Erckmann.

The film's sets were designed by the art director Jean d'Eaubonne.

== Synopsis ==
In Alsace in the 1830s, an innkeeper and burgomaster is haunted by the memories of a Polish Jew he robbed and murdered fifteen years before.

== Cast ==
- Harry Baur as Mathias
- Mady Berry as Catherine
- Georges La Cressonnière as Christian
- Simone Mareuil as Annette
- Lucien Dayle as Walter
- Geo Laby as Richter Fils
- Louis Pré Fils as Muller
- Mlle Rivière as Loïs, la servante
- Raymond Gardanne as Franz
- Raymond Turgy as Nicolas
- Jules Maurier as Le Juif polonais

== Bibliography ==
- Limbacher, James L. . Haven't I seen you somewhere before?: Remakes, sequels, and series in motion pictures and television, 1896-1978. Pierian Press, 1979.
