= Monette Dinay =

French actress

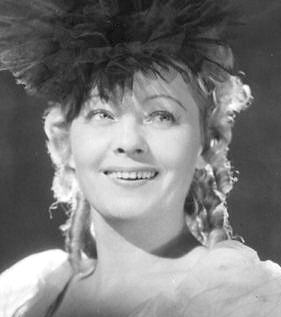
- Monette Dinay in 1940
- Born: 20 September 1906; Le Petit-Quevilly, Seine-Maritime, France
- Died: 19 November 1986 (aged 80); Le Pradet, Var, France
- Other name: Simone Elise Dinet
- Occupation: Actress
- Years active: 1931-1958 (film)

Monette Dinay (20 September 1906– 19 November 1986) was a French film actress.

== Partial filmography ==
- Black and White (1931) - Joséphine
- L'agence O-Kay (1932) - Simone
- That Scoundrel Morin (1932)
- Un beau jour de noces (1932) - Marinette Devaux
- Riri et Nono en vacances (1932)
- L'Ordonnance malgré lui (1932) - Rosine
- The Heir of the Bal Tabarin (1933) - Chiquette
- Le supplice de Tantale (1933)
- Maison hantée (1933)
- Les deux 'Monsieur' de Madame (1973) - Flora
- Le gros lot (1933)
- Madame Bovary (1934) - Félicité
- La garnison amoureuse (1934) - (uncredited)
- On a trouvé une femme nue (1934) - Lucette
- La jeune fille d'une nuit (1934)
- Night in May (1934) - Toni
- Un drôle de numéro (1934) - Solange Ducauchois
- Turandot, Princess of China (1935) - Mien-Li
- The Coquelet Affair (1935) - Justine
- La petite dame du wagon-lit (1936) - Francine
- Prête-moi ta femme (1936) - Riri
- Prends la route (1936) - Denise - la dactylo
- Les dégourdis de la 11ème (1937) - Amélie - la bonne
- Vidocq (1939)
- The Mondesir Heir (1940) - Rosette
- Chiffon's Wedding (1942) - Alice de Liron
- Shot in the Night (1943) - Toinette
- The House on the Dune (1952)
- We Are All Murderers (1952) - La femme de Charles
- Le dossier noir (1955) - Thérèse
- Meeting in Paris (1956) - Mme Jeanne
- La Traversée de Paris (1956) - Madame Jambier
- La Tour, prends garde ! (1958) - Mme Taupin (uncredited)
- Neither Seen Nor Recognized (1958) - Léontine (uncredited) (final film role)

== Bibliography ==
- Crisp, Colin. French Cinema—A Critical Filmography: Volume 2, 1940–1958. Indiana University Press, 2015.
