= Paprika (1933 French film) =

- Directed by: Jean de Limur
- Written by: Bobby E. Lüthge; Jacques Natanson
- Based on: Der Sprung in die Ehe, a play by Max Reimann; Otto Schwartz
- Starring: Irène Zilahy; René Lefèvre; Pierre Etchepare
- Cinematography: Rudolph Maté; Louis Née
- Music by: Franz Waxman
- Production company: Films Romain Pinès
- Distributed by: Les Films Marceau
- Release date: December 1933
- Running time: 77 minutes
- Country: France
- Language: French

Paprika is a 1933 French comedy film directed by Jean de Limur and starring Irène Zilahy, René Lefèvre and Pierre Etchepare. It was based on a play by Max Reimann and Otto Schwartz. A German-language version Paprika had been released the previous year.

== Cast ==
- Irène Zilahy as Ila
- René Lefèvre as Paul Charvin
- Pierre Etchepare as Max Charvin
- Christiane Delyne as Juliette Charvin
- Fernand Charpin as Urbain
- Germaine Michel as Albertine
- Maryanne as Anna

== Bibliography ==
- Oscherwitz, Dayna & Higgins, MaryEllen. The A to Z of French Cinema. Scarecrow Press, 2009.
