= The Lady of the Camellias (1934 film) =

1934 film

- Directed by: Fernand Rivers; Abel Gance
- Written by: Abel Gance
- Based on: The Lady of the Camellias by Alexandre Dumas fils
- Produced by: Abel Gance
- Starring: Yvonne Printemps; Pierre Fresnay; Jane Marken
- Cinematography: Roger Hubert; Harry Stradling Sr.
- Edited by: André Versein
- Music by: Fernand Masson
- Production companies: Les Films Fernand Rivers; Productions Maurice Lehmann
- Distributed by: Les Distributeurs Français
- Release date: 2 November 1934
- Running time: 110 minutes
- Country: France
- Language: French

The Lady of the Camellias (French: La dame aux camélias) is a 1934 French historical romantic drama film directed by Fernand Rivers and Abel Gance and starring Yvonne Printemps, Pierre Fresnay and Jane Marken. It is based on the 1848 novel The Lady of the Camellias by Alexandre Dumas fils. The film's sets were designed by the art directors Henri Ménessier and René Renoux.

== Cast ==
- Yvonne Printemps as Marguerite Gautier
- Pierre Fresnay as Armand Duval
- Jane Marken as Prudence
- Lugné-Poe as M. Duval
- Roland Armontel as Gaston
- André Dubosc as Le duc
- Armand Lurville as Saint-Gaudens
- Irma Génin as Nichette
- Andrée Lafayette as Olympe
- Renée Sénac as Nanine
- Eddy Debray as Varville
- Pierre Morin as Le docteur
- Rivers Cadet as Le marchand d'oublies
- Janine Berry as La patronne

== Bibliography ==
- Bessy, Maurice & Chirat, Raymond. Histoire du cinéma français: 1929-1934. Pygmalion, 1988.
- Crisp, Colin. Genre, Myth and Convention in the French Cinema, 1929-1939. Indiana University Press, 2002.
- Rège, Philippe. Encyclopedia of French Film Directors, Volume 1. Scarecrow Press, 2009.
