= Tovaritch (film) =

1935 film

- Directed by: Jacques Deval; Germain Fried
- Written by: Jacques Deval
- Based on: Tovarich by Jacques Deval
- Produced by: Romain Pinès
- Starring: Irène Zilahy; André Lefaur; Pierre Renoir
- Cinematography: Robert Lefebvre
- Edited by: Jean Delannoy; Henri Rust
- Music by: Michel Michelet
- Production company: Productions Cinégraphiques Jacques Deval
- Distributed by: Compagnie Commerciale Française Cinématographique
- Release date: 3 May 1935
- Running time: 100 minutes
- Country: France
- Language: French

Tovaritch is a 1935 French comedy film directed by Jacques Deval and Germain Fried, along with the uncredited Jean Tarride and Victor Trivas, and starring Irène Zilahy, André Lefaur and Marguerite Deval. It is based on the 1933 play Tovarich by Jacques Deval, who also adapted the screenplay. It was shot at the Francoeur Studios in Paris. The film's sets were designed by the art director Lucien Aguettand. In 1937 the play was adapted again into the Hollywood film Tovarich featuring Claudette Colbert and Charles Boyer.

== Synopsis ==
In 1930s Paris two exiled and apparently impoverished White Russian aristocrats General Ouratieff and his wife Tatiana take jobs as domestic servants. Unknown to their new employers, the General has a billions of Francs deposited in the bank which was entrusted to him for safekeeping by the late Tsar during the 1917 Revolution and which he consequently refuses to touch. Things become more complex when the Soviet Commisar Gorotchenko arrives on the scene in pursuit of the money.

== Cast ==
- André Lefaur as General Mikhaïl Ouratieff
- Irène Zilahy as Tatiana Ouratieff
- André Alerme as Mr Arbeziah
- Pierre Renoir as Gorotchenko
- Pierre Palau as L'hôtelier
- Marguerite Deval as Mme Arbeziah
- Junie Astor as Augustine
- Jean Forest as Georges
- Germaine Michel as La cusinière
- Ariane Borg as Hélène
- Georges Mauloy as Chauffourier-Dubief
- Wina Winfried as Lady Carrigan
- Camille Bert as Comte Breginsky
- Louis-Ferdinand Céline as Un figurant

== Bibliography ==
- Alonso, Harriet Hyman. Robert E. Sherwood: The Playwright in Peace and War. University of Massachusetts Press, 2007.
- Goble, Alan. The Complete Index to Literary Sources in Film. Walter de Gruyter, 1999.
