= Rivers Cadet =

French actor (1892–1968)

Rivers Cadet (1 March 1892 – 1 November 1968) was a French actor.

Cadet was born Jean Maurice Large in Paris. He was the brother of Fernand Rivers.

== Selected filmography ==
- Maurin of the Moors (1932)
- The Ironmaster (1933)
- Three Sailors (1934)
- A Train in the Night (1934)
- The Lady of the Camellias (1934)
- Good Luck (1935)
- The Two Boys (1936)
- Boissière (1937)
- Street Singer (1938)
- Tricoche and Cacolet (1938)
- Liberty (1938)
- Golden Venus (1938)
- Four in the Morning (1938)
- Monsieur Breloque Has Disappeared (1938)
- The President (1938)
- Berlingot and Company (1939)
- Behind the Facade (1939)
- Louise (1939)
- The Path of Honour (1939)
- Sing Anyway (1940)
- Paris-New York (1940)
- Monsieur Hector (1940)
- Notre-Dame de la Mouise (1941)
- The Last of the Six (1941)
- Room 13 (1942)
- Shot in the Night (1943)
- Les Enfants du Paradis (1945)
- Secret Documents (1945)
- The Woman I Murdered (1948)
- Three Investigations (1948)
- The Cupboard Was Bare (1948)
- The Red Angel (1949)
- Adémaï au poteau-frontière (1950)
- King Pandora (1950)
- Mademoiselle Josette, My Woman (1950)
- The Night Is My Kingdom (1951)
- The Prettiest Sin in the World (1951)
- The Passage of Venus (1951)
- The Sleepwalker (1951)
- Topaze (1951)
- The Road to Damascus (1952)
- The Lottery of Happiness (1953)
- Tower of Lust (1955)
- Blood to the Head (1956)
- Captain Fracasse (1961)
