= Lady Seeks a Room =

1937 film

- Directed by: Béla Balogh
- Written by: Jenö Rejtö (novel); Ernö Kulinyi; Miklós László
- Produced by: István Rado
- Starring: Irène Zilahy; István Somló; Ilona Kökény
- Cinematography: Karl Kurzmayer
- Edited by: Péter Pokol
- Music by: Pál Zsigmondy
- Production companies: Magyar Film Iroda; Prizma Film
- Release date: 14 September 1937
- Running time: 89 minutes
- Country: Hungary
- Language: Hungarian

Lady Seeks a Room (Hungarian: Úrilány szobát keres) is a 1937 Hungarian comedy film directed by Béla Balogh and starring Irène Zilahy, István Somló and Ilona Kökény. The film's sets were designed by the art director József Pán.

== Cast ==
- Irène Zilahy as Dr. Klári Székely
- István Somló as Dr. Sándor Lukács
- Gizi Lengyel as Jolán
- Ilona Kökény as Ilka
- Gyula Kabos as Ödön Csahos
- Andor Ajtay as Dr. Miklós Bognár
- László Földényi as Dr. Pápai László
- Béla Mihályffi as Törvényszéki bíró
- Béla Salamon as Szedlacsek Márton
- Sándor Radó as Egy tanú
- Ilona Eszterházy as Sovánka felesége
- István Major as Sovánka Tódor
- Erzsi Pártos as Borbála
- Emil Fenyö as Horváth bankelnök
- Mária Román as Gépírónö
- Imre László as Egy válóperes férj

== Bibliography ==
- Juhász, István. Kincses magyar filmtár 1931-1944: az eredeti forgatókönyvből 1931 és 1944 között létrejött hazai mozgóképekről. Kráter, 2007.
- Rîpeanu, Bujor. (ed.) International Directory of Cinematographers, Set- and Costume Designers in Film: Hungary (from the beginnings to 1988). Saur, 1981.
