= André Lefaur =

French actor (1879–1952)

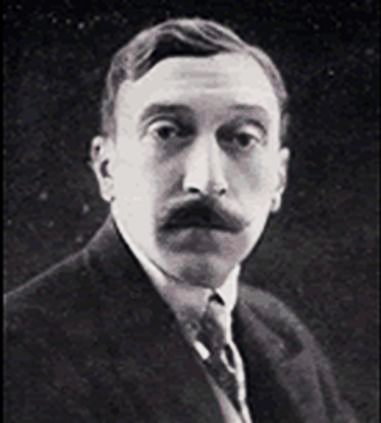
- Born: Alphonse André Lefaurichon; 25 July 1879; Paris, France
- Died: 5 December 1952 (aged 73); Paris, France
- Years active: 1905–1944

André Lefaur (25 July 1879 – 5 December 1952) was a French film and theatre actor, notably working several times with director Sacha Guitry. He is buried at

== Partial filmography ==
- La Vénus d'Arles (1911)
- L'homme qui assassina (1913)
- Ainsi va la vie (1918, short)
- The Tenth Symphony (1918)
- Une fleur dans les ronces (1920)
- Monsieur Lebidois propriétaire (1922)
- The Marriage of Rosine (1926)
- A Gentleman of the Ring (1926)
- His Highness Love (1931)
- Le Bal (1931)
- Orange Blossom (1932)
- His Best Client (1932)
- La dame de chez Maxim's (1933)
- The Ideal Woman (1934)
- L'aristo (1934)
- Dora Nelson (1935)
- School for Coquettes (1935)
- Tovaritch (1935)
- With a smile (1936)
- The King (1936)
- Let's Make a Dream (1936)
- Rigolboche (1936)
- Samson (1936)
- The Green Jacket (1937)
- The House Opposite (1937)
- La peau d'un autre (1937)
- The Club of Aristocrats (1937)
- Le fauteuil 47 (1937)
- Les dégourdis de la 11ème (1937)
- Adrienne Lecouvreur (1938)
- L'ange que j'ai vendu (1938)
- La Glu (1938)
- The President (1938)
- Le monsieur de 5 heures (1938)
- Four in the Morning (1938)
- Un fichu métier (1938)
- Behind the Facade (1939)
- Entente cordiale (1939)
- Deputy Eusèbe (1939)
- The Path of Honour (1939)
- The Fatted Calf (1939)
- Mon oncle et mon cure (1939)
- Nine Bachelors (1939)
- Sacred Woods (1939)
- Terra di fuoco (1939)
- Miquette (1940)
- Paris-New York (1940)
- Parade en 7 nuits (1941)
- Soyez les bienvenus (1942)
- The Phantom Baron (1943)
- Les petites du quai aux fleurs (1944)
