= Jacques Tourneur =

French-American film director (1904–1977)

- Tourneur on set of Canyon Passage, 1946
- Born: Jacques Thomas; November 12, 1904; Paris, France
- Died: December 19, 1977 (aged 73); Bergerac, France
- Other name: Jack Turner
- Citizenship: France; United States (from 1919)
- Occupations: Director, producer, editor
- Years active: 1929–1966
- Father: Maurice Tourneur

Jacques Tourneur (/ˈtʊrnər/; French: [tuʁnœʁ]; November 12, 1904 – December 19, 1977) was a French and American filmmaker, active during the Golden Age of Hollywood. He was known as an auteur of stylish and atmospheric genre films, many of them for RKO Pictures, including the supernatural horror films Cat People (1942), I Walked with a Zombie (1943) and The Leopard Man (1943), and the film noir Out of the Past (1947). He is also known for directing the war film Days of Glory (1944), which marked Gregory Peck's debut film role, and the British horror film Night of the Demon (1957), which was released by Columbia Pictures as Curse of the Demon.

Tourneur is considered a significant influence on the horror film genre.

== Early life ==
Tourneur was born in Paris, France, the son of Fernande Petit and film director Maurice Tourneur. At age 10, he moved to the United States with his father, and he became a United States citizen in 1919.

He started a career in cinema while still attending high school as an extra and later as a script clerk in various silent films. Both Maurice and Jacques returned to France after his father worked on the film The Mysterious Island in 1925.

== Career ==
Tourneur began work as an editor and assistant director. He made his debut as a director on the French film Tout ça ne vaut pas l'amour in 1931. In 1934, Tourneur went to Hollywood, where he had a contract with MGM Studios. While working as the second unit director on the film A Tale of Two Cities he met film producer Val Lewton.

Tourneur made his American feature debut as director in the 1939 film They All Come Out. After Tourneur was dropped by MGM in 1941, he was picked up by Lewton to film several acclaimed low-budget horror films for RKO Studios including Cat People and I Walked with a Zombie.

Cat People, his first commercial success, although considered a B movie and made on a limited budget, was distinguished by a style of lighting and cinematography that has been imitated countless times. Tourneur was promoted to the A-list at RKO, directing films including Out of the Past and Berlin Express. In the 1950s, Tourneur became a freelance director, filming various genre films including Wichita, Anne of the Indies, Way of a Gaucho, Nightfall, The Flame and the Arrow, Stars In My Crown and Night of the Demon. His last two films, made for American International Pictures and starring Vincent Price, were The Comedy of Terrors (1963) and War-Gods of the Deep (1965).

After his final days working for film, Tourneur began directing television episodes. Tourneur filmed episodes of The Barbara Stanwyck Show, Bonanza, The Twilight Zone, and The Alaskans. Tourneur's final director credit was for an episode of T.H.E. Cat in 1966. Tourneur then retired and returned to France.

== Appraisal ==
In a 2019 retrospective, the Lincoln Center wrote of Tourneur "[he] ranks among the most fascinating yet most elusive filmmakers of his time... Tourneur mixed the uncanny with the psychological, located even the most outlandish premises within familiar spheres, and roguishly circumvented financial constraints through his singular artistry."

In The American Cinema, Andrew Sarris wrote Tourneur brought "a certain French gentility to the American cinema... Tourneur's first films for Val Lewton - Cat People and I Walked with a Zombie - possessed a subtler dramatic force than those of Wise and Robson. Out of the Past is still Tourneur's masterpiece, a civilized treatment of an annihilating melodrama... All in all, Tourneur's career represents a triumph of taste over force."

According to the American Cinematheque, "Tourneur singlehandedly elevated horror as an artform."

== Personal life ==
Tourneur became estranged from his father after beginning an affair with his then-lover, the French actress Marguerite Christiane Virideau (1905-1993), notable for having supplied the voice for Snow White in the French dub of the Disney classic. After moving to the United States, they married on 22 April 1934, remaining together until his death.

=== Death ===
Tourneur died in 1977, aged 73, in Bergerac, Dordogne, France.

== Posterity ==
La Mort en direct, a 1980 film by Bertrand Tavernier, is dedicated to the deceased film director Jacques Tourneur.

"There are films that watch us grow old." Statement by Serge Daney quoted by Serge Le Péron in Jacques Tourneur Le Médium, a film by Alain Mazars, 2015.

By naming the main character Jessica Holland in his film Memoria (2021), Apichatpong Weerasethakul pays tribute to Jacques Tourneur's film I Walked with a Zombie.

== Filmography ==
=== Director ===
Feature films

- All That's Not Worth Love (1931, French)
- Toto (1933, French)
- To Be Loved (1933, French)
- The Concierge's Daughters (1934, French)
- They All Come Out (1939)
- Nick Carter, Master Detective (1939)
- Phantom Raiders (1940)
- Doctors Don't Tell (1941)
- Cat People (1942)
- I Walked with a Zombie (1943)
- The Leopard Man (1943)
- Days of Glory (1944)
- Experiment Perilous (1944)
- Canyon Passage (1946)
- Out of the Past (1947)
- Berlin Express (1948)
- Easy Living (1949)
- Stars In My Crown (1950)
- The Flame and the Arrow (1950)
- Circle of Danger (1951)
- Anne of the Indies (1951)
- Way of a Gaucho (1952)
- Appointment in Honduras (1953)
- Stranger on Horseback (1955)
- Wichita (1955)
- Great Day in the Morning (1956)
- Nightfall (1956)
- Night of the Demon (1957)
- The Fearmakers (1958)
- Timbuktu (1959)
- Frontier Rangers (1959)
- Giant of Marathon (1959)
- The Comedy of Terrors (1964)
- War-Gods of the Deep (1965)

Short films

- 1936 – The Jonker Diamond
- 1936 – Harnessed Rhythm
- 1936 – Master Will Shakespeare
- 1936 – Killer Dog
- 1937 – The Grand Bounce
- 1937 – The Boss Didn't Say Good Morning
- 1937 – The King Without a Crown
- 1937 – The Rainbow Pass
- 1937 – Romance of Radium
- 1937 – The Man in the Barn
- 1937 – What Do You Think?
- 1938 – What Do You Think? (Number Three)
- 1938 – The Ship That Died
- 1938 – The Face Behind the Mask
- 1938 – What Do You Think?: Tupapaoo
- 1938 – Strange Glory
- 1938 – Think It Over
- 1939 – Yankee Doodle Goes to Town
- 1942 – The Incredible Stranger
- 1942 – The Magic Alphabet
- 1944 – Reward Unlimited

==== TV ====
- 1955-1961 : General Electric Theater, 4 episodes
  - 1955 : "The Martyr"
  - 1955 : "Into the Night"
  - 1960 : "Aftermath"
  - 1961 : "Star Witness: The Lili Parrish Story"
- 1956 : The Jane Wyman Show, 3 episodes
  - 1956 : "The Liberator"
  - 1956 : "Kristi"
  - 1956 : "The Mirror"
- 1957 : Schlitz Playhouse of Stars, 1 episode
  - 1957 : "Outlaw's Boots"
- 1957 : The Walter Winchell File, 3 episodes
  - 1957 : "The Steep Hill"
  - 1958 : "House on Biscayne Bay"
  - 1958 : "The Stopover"
- 1958 : Cool and Lam, CBS Productions
- 1958 : Northwest Passage, 8 episodes
  - 1958 : "The Gunsmith"
  - 1958 : "The Burning Village"
  - 1958 : "The Bond Women"
  - 1959 : "The Break Out"
  - 1959 : "The Vulture"
  - 1959 : "The Traitor"
  - 1959 : "The Assassin"
  - 1959 : "The Hostage"
- 1959 : Bonanza, 1 episode
  - 1960 : "Denver McKee"
- 1959 : The Alaskans, 1 episode
  - 1960 : "The Devil Makers"
- 1960 : The Barbara Stanwyck Show, 11 episodes
  - 1960 : "The Mink Coat"
  - 1960 : "Ironbark's Bridge"
  - 1960 : "The Miraculous Journey of Tadpole Chan"
  - 1961 : "Frightened Doll"
  - 1961 : "The Choice"
  - 1961 : "Sign of the Zodiac"
  - 1961 : "Adventure on Happiness Street"
  - 1961 : "The Golden Acres"
  - 1961 : "Confession"
  - 1961 : "Dragon by the Tail"
  - 1961 : "Dear Charlie"
- 1962 : Adventures in Paradise, 1 episode
  - 1962 : "A Bride for the Captain"
- 1962 : Follow the Sun, 1 episode
  - "Sergeant Kolchak Fades Away"
- 1963 : The Twilight Zone, 1 episode
  - 1963 : "Night Call"
- 1966 : T.H.E. Cat, 1 episode
  - 1966 : "The Ring of Anasis"

=== Assistant director or editor ===
- 1929 : Le Navire des hommes perdus (Das schiff der verlorenen menschen), directed by Maurice Tourneur
- 1930 : Accusée, Levez vous, directed by Maurice Tourneur
- 1931 : Maison de danses, directed by Maurice Tourneur
- 1931 : Partir, directed by Maurice Tourneur
- 1932 : Au nom de la Loi, directed by Maurice Tourneur
- 1932 : Les Gaités de l'escadron, directed by Maurice Tourneur (Editor)
- 1933 : Les Deux Orphelines, directed by Maurice Tourneur (Editor)
- 1993 : Lidoire, directed by Maurice Tourneur.
- 1933 : Obsession, directed by Maurice Tourneur (uncredited)
- 1933 : La Fusée, directed by Jacques Natanson (Editor)
- 1933 : Le Voleur, directed by Maurice Tourneur
- 1934 : Rothchild, directed by Maurice Tourneur (Editor)
- 1935 : A Tale of Two Cities, directed by Jack Conway, war sequences, (séquence de la prise de la Bastille).
