= Four in the Morning (1938 film) =

1938 film

- Directed by: Fernand Rivers
- Written by: Fernand Rivers; Yves Mirande
- Produced by: Fernand Rivers
- Starring: Lucien Baroux; André Lefaur; Lyne Clevers
- Cinematography: Raymond Agnel
- Edited by: Jacques Desagneaux
- Music by: Henri Verdun
- Production company: Les Films Fernand Rivers
- Distributed by: D.U.C.
- Release date: 27 January 1938
- Running time: 82 minutes
- Country: France
- Language: French

Four in the Morning (French: Quatre heures du matin) is a 1938 French comedy film directed by Fernand Rivers and starring Lucien Baroux, André Lefaur and Lyne Clevers. The film's sets were designed by the art director René Renoux.

== Cast ==
- Lucien Baroux as Bidon Durand
- André Lefaur as La Bobine
- Lyne Clevers as Anne d'Autriche
- Germaine Laugier as Madame Durand
- Marguerite Moreno as La Duchesse
- Rivers Cadet as Le valet de chambre
- Armand Lurville as Un locataire
- Georges Morton as Le mousquetaire
- Gisèle Parry as Une entraîneuse

== Bibliography ==
- Bessy, Maurice & Chirat, Raymond. Histoire du cinéma français: 1935-1939. Pygmalion, 1986.
- Crisp, Colin. Genre, Myth and Convention in the French Cinema, 1929-1939. Indiana University Press, 2002.
- Rège, Philippe. Encyclopedia of French Film Directors, Volume 1. Scarecrow Press, 2009.
