= Myno Burney =

Swiss actress (1907–1996)

- Born: 19 August 1907; Geneva, Switzerland
- Died: 6 March 1996 (aged 88); Le Perray, Yvelines, France
- Other name: Wilhelmine Burnet
- Occupation: Actress
- Years active: 1932-1956 (film)

Myno Burney (1907–1996) was a Swiss film actress.

== Partial filmography ==
- The Call Box Mystery (1932) - Paul Grayle
- The New Hotel (1932)
- Le petit écart (1932)
- La dame de chez Maxim's (1933)
- Le client du numéro 16 (1933)
- La cinquième empreinte (1934) - Suzanne
- Cessez le feu (1934)
- La famille Pont-Biquet (1935)
- La fille de Madame Angot (1935)
- Un soir de bombe (1935) - La femme de chambre
- Light Cavalry (1935) - Catella
- Prête-moi ta femme (1936) - Lily
- Bach the Detective (1936) - Vendeuse de la bijouterie
- Compliments of Mister Flow (1936) - (uncredited)
- Tout va très bien madame la marquise (1936)
- J'arrose mes galons (1936)
- La loupiote (1937) - La môme Torchon
- The Beauty of Montparnasse (1937) - Rosalie
- Passeurs d'hommes (1937) - Greta Worms
- Titin des Martigues (1938) - L'Américaine #1
- Trois artilleurs en vadrouille (1938) - La prof
- Les gaietés de l'exposition (1938) - Dolorès
- Les rois de la flotte (1938)
- Champions of France (1938) - Gladys Lodje
- Deux de la réserve (1938) - L'espionne
- Paradise Lost (1940) - (uncredited)
- The Lost Woman (1942) - Adrienne
- Le carrefour des enfants perdus (1944) - Germaine (uncredited)
- The Temptation of Barbizon (1946) - Dominique Ancelin
- Good Lord Without Confession (1953) - Marie Dupont
- La Traversée de Paris (1956) - Angèle Marchandot (final film role)

== Bibliography ==
- Goble, Alan. The Complete Index to Literary Sources in Film. Walter de Gruyter, 1999.
