= Monsieur Hector =

1940 film by Maurice Cammage

- Directed by: Maurice Cammage
- Written by: Marivaux (play); Pierre Maudru; Jean Rioux; J. d'Ansennes
- Starring: Fernandel; Denise Grey; Georges Grey
- Cinematography: Georges Clerc
- Edited by: Myriam Borsoutsky
- Music by: Casimir Oberfeld
- Production company: Stella Productions
- Distributed by: Films Sonores Tobis
- Release date: 13 December 1940
- Running time: 85 minutes
- Country: France
- Language: French

Monsieur Hector is a 1940 French musical comedy film based upon the play by Pierre de Marivaux, directed by Maurice Cammage and starring Fernandel, Denise Grey and Georges Grey. It was shot at the Neuilly Studios in Paris. The film's sets were designed by the art director Marcel Magniez.

== Synopsis ==
An aristocrat and his valet, after disappointments in life, decide to switch clothes and positions during the Nice Carnival.

== Cast ==
- Fernandel as Hector
- Denise Grey as Maroussia de Dragomir
- Georges Grey as Vicomte de Saint-Amand
- Gaby Wagner as Jacqueline Monturot
- Raymond Rognoni as Monturot
- Madeleine Suffel as Suzanne
- Marthe Mussine as Chamber maid
- Alice Deneige as Singer
- Rivers Cadet as Maître d'hôtel
- Marfa d'Hervilly as Old client
- Pierre Ferval
- Suzanne Fleurant as Client
- Édouard Francomme
- Jacques Henley as Client
- Philippe Richard as Manager
- Jean-Jacques Steen
- Jean Témerson as Baron Grondin
- Eugène Yvernès
- Georges Guétary as Tyrolien damner

== Production ==
The film was shot during the last moments of the Phoney War. It is one of many films Fernandel has played in in 1940. The film's working title was Le Nègre du Negresco.

== Reception ==
Fulvio Fulvi, in his books about Fernandel, judged it was "an unpretentious film suited to the times".

== Bibliography ==
- Quinlan, David. Quinlan's Film Stars. Batsford, 2000.
