= The Road to Damascus (film) =

1952 film

- Directed by: Max Glass
- Written by: Max Glass
- Produced by: Max Glass; Fernand Rivers
- Starring: Michel Simon; Antoine Balpêtré; Jean-Marc Tennberg
- Cinematography: Eugen Schüfftan
- Edited by: André Gaudier
- Music by: Marius Constant
- Production companies: Max Glass Film; Les Films Fernand Rivers
- Distributed by: Les Films Fernand Rivers
- Release date: 5 December 1952
- Running time: 108 minutes
- Country: France
- Language: French

The Road to Damascus (French: Le chemin de Damas) is a 1952 French historical drama film directed by Max Glass and starring Michel Simon, Antoine Balpêtré and Jean-Marc Tennberg. It was shot at the Joinville Studios in Paris. The film's sets were designed by the art director Guy de Gastyne.

== Cast ==
- Michel Simon as Caïphe
- Antoine Balpêtré as Gamaliel
- Jean-Marc Tennberg as Saül de Tarse
- Jacques Dufilho as Pierre
- Christiane Lénier as Déborah
- Line Noro as La mère d'Etienne
- François Chaumette as Barnabé
- Nathalie Nerval as Magdala
- Maurice Teynac as Le Christ
- Claude Laydu as Etienne
- Georges Vitray as Le chef de la police
- Roger Hanin as Un disciple
- Charles Vissières as Le vieux
- Pierre Palau
- Paul Demange
- Françoise Goléa
- Guy Mairesse
- Rivers Cadet
- Pierre Moncorbier
- Alexandre Mihalesco

== Bibliography ==
- Hayward, Susan. French Costume Drama of the 1950s: Fashioning Politics in Film. Intellect Books, 2010.
- Magerstädt, Sylvie. Philosophy, Myth and Epic Cinema: Beyond Mere Illusions. Rowman & Littlefield, 2014.
