= Philippe Richard =

French actor

Philippe Richard (24 June 1891 – 24 December 1973) was a French film and theater actor.

Richard was born in Saint-Étienne and began his film career in the early 1920s in silent film. In 1948 he starred in the film The Lame Devil under Sacha Guitry. He died in Paris in 1973.

== Selected filmography ==
- The Clairvoyant (1924)
- Fantômas (1932)
- The Accomplice (1932)
- The Agony of the Eagles (1933)
- The Tunnel (1933)
- Night in May (1934)
- The Devil in the Bottle (1935)
- Compliments of Mister Flow (1936)
- Nitchevo (1936)
- 27 Rue de la Paix (1936)
- Port Arthur (1936)
- Pépé le Moko (1937)
- The Alibi (1937)
- The Club of Aristocrats (1937)
- The Citadel of Silence (1937)
- Yoshiwara (1937)
- The Novel of Werther (1938)
- The Woman from the End of the World (1938)
- The West (1938)
- Prince Bouboule (1939)
- Adrienne Lecouvreur (1938)
- The Phantom Carriage (1939)
- The Path of Honour (1939)
- Serenade (1940)
- Monsieur Hector (1940)
- Paris-New York (1940)
- The Emigrant (1940)
- The Master Valet (1941)
- The Law of Spring (1942)
- Private Life (1942)
- Mandrin (1947)
- The Woman I Murdered (1948)
- Three Investigations (1948)
- Véronique (1950)
- Wedding Night (1950)
- The Billionaire Tramp (1951)
- The Night Is My Kingdom (1951)
- The Darling of His Concierge (1951)
- Heart of the Casbah (1952)
- The Happiest of Men (1952)
- Koenigsmark (1953)
- Quintuplets in the Boarding School (1953)
- When You Read This Letter (1953)
- The Call of Destiny (1953)
