= Lyne Clevers =

French actress

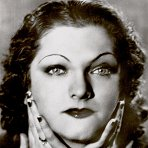
- Clevers in 1930
- Born: 22 October 1909; Paris, France
- Died: 28 November 1991 (aged 82); Poissy, Yvelines, France
- Other name: Céline Marie Rhalavsky
- Occupation: Actress
- Years active: 1931–1938 (film)

Lyne Clevers (October 22, 1909 – November 28, 1991) was a French singer and film actress.

== Selected filmography ==
- Amours viennoises (1931)
- Mam'zelle Spahi (1934)
- Le cavalier Lafleur (1934)
- Le Grand Jeu (1934)
- Carnival in Flanders (1935)
- Whirlpool of Desire (1935)
- The Bride of the Regiment (1936)
- Gribouille (1937)
- Four in the Morning (1938)

== Bibliography ==
- Goble, Alan. The Complete Index to Literary Sources in Film. Walter de Gruyter, 1999.
- Klossner, Michael. The Europe of 1500–1815 on Film and Television: A Worldwide Filmography of Over 2550 Works, 1895 Through 2000. McFarland & Company, 2002.
