= The President (1938 film) =

1938 film

- Directed by: Fernand Rivers
- Written by: Yves Mirande
- Based on: The President by Maurice Hennequin
- Produced by: Fernand Rivers
- Starring: Elvire Popesco; Henri Garat; André Lefaur
- Cinematography: Jean Bachelet
- Edited by: Jacques Desagneaux
- Music by: Jean Sautreuil
- Production company: Les Films Fernand Rivers
- Distributed by: D.U.C.
- Release date: 25 May 1938
- Running time: 85 minutes
- Country: France
- Language: French

The President (French: La présidente) is a 1938 French comedy film directed by Fernand Rivers and starring Elvire Popesco, Henri Garat and André Lefaur. It is based on the 1912 play of the same title by Maurice Hennequin. The film's sets were designed by the art director René Renoux. The play was adapted again for the 1952 Italian film Mademoiselle Gobete.

== Cast ==
- Elvire Popesco as Vérotcha
- Henri Garat as Le ministre Jean-Pierre Gaudet
- André Lefaur as Le président Tricointe
- Louis-Jacques Boucot as L'interprète
- Nina Myral as Sophie
- Maurice Dorléac as Rosimond
- Rivers Cadet as Biennassis
- Micheline Francey as Denise
- Doumel as Marius
- Gaston Gabaroche as Pinglet
- Georges Morton as Laboulène
- Pierre Darteuil as Un huissier
- Suzanne Dehelly as Madame Tricointe

== Bibliography ==
- Bessy, Maurice & Chirat, Raymond. Histoire du cinéma français: 1935-1939. Pygmalion, 1986.
- Crisp, Colin. Genre, Myth and Convention in the French Cinema, 1929-1939. Indiana University Press, 2002.
- Goble, Alan. The Complete Index to Literary Sources in Film. Walter de Gruyter, 1999.
- Rège, Philippe. Encyclopedia of French Film Directors, Volume 1. Scarecrow Press, 2009.
