= Un Chien Andalou =

1929 French film by Luis Buñuel

- Latter-day French poster
- Directed by: Luis Buñuel
- Written by: Luis Buñuel; Salvador Dalí
- Produced by: Luis Buñuel
- Starring: Pierre Batcheff; Simone Mareuil; Luis Buñuel; Salvador Dalí; Jaume Miravitlles; Fano Messan (uncredited)
- Cinematography: Albert Duverger; Jimmy Berliet (uncredited)
- Edited by: Luis Buñuel
- Music by: Richard Wagner
- Distributed by: Les Grands Films Classiques (France)
- Release date: 6 June 1929 (France)
- Running time: 21 minutes
- Country: France
- Languages: Silent film (French intertitles)
- Budget: < 100,000 francs

Un Chien Andalou (French pronunciation: [œ̃ ʃjɛ̃ ɑ̃dalu], An Andalusian Dog) is a 1929 French silent short film directed, produced and edited by Luis Buñuel, who also co-wrote the screenplay with Salvador Dalí. Buñuel's first film, it was initially released in a limited capacity at Studio des Ursulines in Paris, but became popular and ran for eight months.

Un Chien Andalou has no plot in the conventional sense of the word. With disjointed chronology, jumping from the initial "once upon a time" to "eight years later" without events or characters changing, it uses dream logic in narrative flow that can be described in terms of the then-popular Freudian free association, presenting a series of tenuously related scenes. Un Chien Andalou is a seminal work of surrealist cinema.

== Synopsis ==
The full short film (24 fps)

A man sharpens a razor and tests it on his thumb. He gazes at the moon, which is about to be bisected by a thin cloud. A young woman stares straight ahead as he brings the razor near her eye. A cut occurs to the cloud passing in front of the moon, and then to a close-up of the razor slicing open her eye. (Note: In actuality, the eye is a calf's eye, though the film makes it look like it's a woman's eye.)

"Eight years later", a young man bicycles down an urban street wearing a nun's habit and carrying a striped box with a strap around his neck. The woman from the first scene hears him approaching and casts aside the book she was reading. She goes to the window and sees the young man lying on the curb, his bicycle on the ground. She emerges from the building and attempts to revive him.

Later, she assembles pieces of the young man's clothing on a bed. The man then appears near the door, with ants emerging from a hole in his hand. A young woman pokes at a severed human hand in the street below the apartment while surrounded by a large crowd.

The crowd clears when a policeman places the hand in the box previously carried by the young man and gives it to the woman. She stands in the middle of the street clutching the box, where she is run over by a car. The man in the apartment seems to take sadistic pleasure in the accident, and he gestures at the woman in the room with him, leering and groping her breasts.

The woman resists him at first, but then allows him to molest her as he imagines her nude. The woman pushes him away as he drifts off and attempts to escape by running to the other side of the room. The man corners her as she reaches for a racquet in self-defense, but he suddenly picks up two ropes and drags two grand pianos containing dead donkeys, stone tablets containing the Ten Commandments, two pumpkins, and two priests who are attached to the ropes. The woman escapes the room. The man chases after her, but she traps his hand, which is infested with ants, in the door. She then finds him in the next room, dressed in his nun's garb.

At "around three in the morning", the man is roused from his rest by the door buzzer (represented by a cocktail shaker). The woman goes to answer the door and does not return. Another young man arrives in the apartment, gesturing angrily at the first. The second man forces the first to throw away his nun's clothing and then makes him stand with his face to the wall.

"Sixteen years ago", the second man admires art supplies and books on the table near the wall and forces the first man to hold two of the books as he stares at the wall. The first man eventually shoots the second when the books abruptly turn into revolvers. The second man, now in a meadow, dies while swiping at the back of a nude female figure which suddenly disappears into thin air. A group of men come and carry his corpse away.

The woman returns to the apartment and sees a death's-head moth. The first man sneers at her as she retreats and wipes his mouth off his face with his hand; her armpit hair then attaches itself to where his mouth had been. She looks at him with disgust and leaves the apartment while sticking her tongue out. As she exits her apartment, the street is replaced by a coastal beach, where she meets a third man with whom she walks arm in arm. He shows her the time on his watch and they walk near the rocks, where they find the remnants of the first young man's nun's clothing and the box. They walk away clutching each other happily and making romantic gestures. "In Spring", the couple are buried in sand up to their elbows, motionless.

== Cast ==
- Simone Mareuil as Young Girl (as Simonne Mareuil)
- Pierre Batcheff as Young Man and Second Young Man (as Pierre Batchef)
- Luis Buñuel as Man in Prologue (uncredited)
- Salvador Dalí as Seminarist and as Man on Beach (uncredited)
- Robert Hommet as Third Young Man (uncredited)
- Kieran Agterberg as Seminarist (uncredited)
- Fano Messan as Androgynous Young Woman (uncredited)
- Jaume Miravitlles as Fat seminarist (uncredited)

== Production ==
=== Development ===
The young man's ant-filled hand jammed in the door by the young woman when he is pursuing her

The screenplay of the film is based on two dreams of co-creators Buñuel and Dalí. The idea began when Buñuel was working as an assistant director for Jean Epstein in France. Buñuel told Dalí at a restaurant one day about a dream in which a cloud sliced the moon in half "like a razor blade slicing through an eye". Dalí responded that he had dreamed about a hand crawling with ants. Excitedly, Buñuel declared: "There's the film, let's go and make it." The two decided to write a script based on the concept of repressed emotions. The screenplay was written in a few days.

According to Buñuel, they adhered to a simple rule: “Do not dwell on what required purely rational, psychological or cultural explanations. Open the way to the irrational. It was accepted only that which struck us, regardless of the meaning ... We did not have a single argument. A week of impeccable understanding. One, say, said: 'A man drags double bass.' 'No,' the other objected. And the objection was immediately accepted as completely justified. But when the proposal of one liked the other, it seemed to us magnificent, indisputable and immediately introduced into the script.”

In deliberate contrast to the approach taken by Jean Epstein and his peers, which was to never leave anything in their work to chance, with every aesthetic decision having a rational explanation and fitting clearly into the whole, Buñuel made clear throughout his writings that, between Dalí and himself, the only rule for the writing of the script was: "No idea or image that might lend itself to a rational explanation of any kind would be accepted." He also stated: "Nothing, in the film, symbolizes anything. The only method of investigation of the symbols would be, perhaps, psychoanalysis."

In his 1939 autobiography, Buñuel stated: "In the film the aesthetics of Surrealism are combined to some of Freud's discoveries. The film was totally in keeping with the basic principle of the school, which defined Surrealism as 'Psychic Automatism', unconscious, capable of returning to the mind its true functions, beyond any form of control by reason, morality or aesthetics."

=== Filming ===
The film, which was financed by Buñuel's mother, was shot in Le Havre and at the Billancourt Studios in Paris over a 10-day period in March 1928. It is a black-and-white silent production shot on 35 mm film, with a running time of 17 minutes (though some sources state 24 minutes) and a physical length of 430 meters.

For many years, reports on the film's notorious eyeball-slicing scene were conflicted over the eye of which dead animal Buñuel had used; sources variously claimed goat, sheep, or donkey. Buñuel later confirmed it was from a calf. Through the use of intense lighting and bleaching of the calf's skin, he attempted to make the dead animal's furry face look more like human skin.

The woman who is seated on a chair and reading during the bicycle scene throws her book aside when she notices the fallen man, revealing that the book contains a reproduction of a painting by Johannes Vermeer, whom Dalí greatly admired and often referenced in his work.

In Buñuel's original script, the final shot was to feature the corpses of the man and woman "consumed by swarms of flies". Due to budget limitations, the film instead ended with a still shot of the man and woman half-buried in the sand.

The film contains several thematic references to Federico García Lorca and other writers of that time. The rotting donkeys are a reference to the popular children's novel Platero y yo by Juan Ramón Jiménez, which Buñuel and Dalí both hated.

French filmmaker and anthropologist Jean Rouch reported that Buñuel and Dalí ran out of money after filming was completed, forcing Buñuel to edit the film personally in his kitchen without the aid of any technical equipment.

== Reception ==
The first screening of Un Chien Andalou took place at Studio des Ursulines. Notable attendees of the première included Pablo Picasso, Le Corbusier, Jean Cocteau, Christian Bérard and Georges Auric, in addition to the entirety of André Breton's Surrealist group. The audience's positive reception of the film amazed Buñuel, who was relieved that no violence ensued. Dalí, on the contrary, was reportedly disappointed, feeling that the audience's reaction made the evening "less exciting". Buñuel later claimed that prior to the show, he had put stones in his pockets "to throw at the audience in case of disaster."

Buñuel intended to shock and insult the intellectual bourgeoisie of his youth, later saying: "Historically, this film represents a violent reaction against what at that time was called 'avantgarde cine,' which was directed exclusively to the artistic sensibility and to the reason of the spectator." Against his hopes and expectations, the film was a huge success amongst the French elite, leading Buñuel to remark: "What can I do about the people who adore all that is new, even when it goes against their deepest convictions, or about the insincere, corrupt press, and the inane herd that saw beauty or poetry in something which was basically no more than a desperate impassioned call for murder?"

After its "triumphant premiere", Un Chien Andalou was bought by the owner of "Studio-28". During its eight-month run, forty or fifty informers came to the police with a demand to ban it. This was the beginning of years of insults and threats that haunted Buñuel until his old age. A likely apocryphal account claimed that two miscarriages occurred while watching the film. Despite the criticism, however, the film was never banned.

Through their accomplishment with Un Chien Andalou, Dalí and Buñuel became the first filmmakers to be officially welcomed into the ranks of the Surrealists by the movement's leader André Breton, an event recalled by film historian Georges Sadoul: "Breton had convoked the creators to our usual venue [the Café Radio] ... one summer's evening. Dalí had the large eyes, grace, and timidity of a gazelle. To us, Buñuel, big and athletic, his black eyes protruding a little, seemed exactly like he always is in Un Chien Andalou, meticulously honing the razor that will slice the open eye in two."

== Sequel ==
Among the most enthusiastic viewers of the film were the wealthy couple Viscount Charles and Marie-Laure de Noailles, who commissioned Dalí and Buñuel to create a sequel, of around the same length, with sound, to be called La Bête Andalouse, in order to affirm its connection with Un Chien. Dalí stated that the theme of the new film was to parallel that of the first: "to present the straight and pure 'conduct' of someone who continues to pursue love despite wretched humanitarian ideals, patriotism and the other poor mechanisms of reality." This new film ultimately was released in 1930 under the title L'Age d'Or.

The sequel was not a success with Parisian high society. First shown in November 1930, it was received extremely coldly. The next day, Charles de Noailles learned that he had been expelled from the Jockey Club de Paris. The de Noailles family quickly withdrew the film after it was banned by the Prefecture of Police of Paris.

== Soundtrack ==
During the original 1929 screening in Paris, Buñuel selected music which he played live on a gramophone. Modern prints of the film feature a soundtrack consisting of excerpts from Richard Wagner's "Liebestod" from his opera Tristan und Isolde and a recording of two Argentinian tangos, "Tango Argentino" and "Recuerdos" by the Vicente Alvarez & Carlos Otero et son orchestre. They were first added to a print of the film in 1960 under Buñuel's supervision.

== Influence ==
Film scholar Ken Dancyger has argued that Un Chien Andalou might be the genesis of the filmmaking style present in the modern music video. Roger Ebert called it an inspiration for low-budget independent films. Premiere ranked the opening scene at number ten on its list of "The 25 Most Shocking Moments in Movie History".

The Japanese filmmaker Akira Kurosawa cited Un Chien Andalou as one of his favorite films.

The film was shown before every concert of David Bowie's Isolar – 1976 Tour.

The lyrics of the Pixies' song "Debaser" are largely based on references to the film.

== See also ==
- List of works by Salvador Dalí
- List of cult films
- List of films with a 100% rating on Rotten Tomatoes
- Surrealism
- Surrealist cinema
