= Prince Bouboule =

1939 film

- Belgian poster
- Directed by: Jacques Houssin
- Written by: Pierre Maudru; Michel-Georges Michel
- Produced by: Georges Milton; Louis Gondry
- Starring: Georges Milton; Irén Zilahy; Michèle Alfa
- Cinematography: Willy Faktorovitch
- Music by: Paul Misraki; Ray Ventura
- Production company: Les Productions Parisiennes
- Distributed by: Gallic Films
- Release date: 11 January 1939
- Running time: 95 minutes
- Country: France
- Language: French

Prince Bouboule (French: Le prince Bouboule) is a 1939 French comedy film directed by Jacques Houssin and starring Georges Milton, Irén Zilahy and Michèle Alfa. It was one of several films featuring Milton in the role of Bouboule. The film's sets were designed by the art director Claude Bouxin.

== Synopsis ==
Bouboule is working as a taxi driver in Paris. A Russian princess wants to marry him for a time in order to gain French nationality. He agrees, although he can't wait for his divorce so that he can marry his girlfriend Lucette. In the meantime he gets drawn into a series of adventures.

== Cast ==
- Georges Milton as Eugène Leroy dit Bouboule
- Irén Zilahy as La princesse Sonia
- Michèle Alfa as Lucette
- Mady Berry as Madame Leroy - la mère d'Eugène
- Georges Bever as Le balayeur
- Geneviève Callix as Tania
- Louis Florencie as Loustalot
- Gustave Gallet as Le maire
- Charles Lemontier as Charly
- Fernand Rauzéna as Wassilieff
- Philippe Richard as Ricard
- Robert Seller as Le notaire
- Marcel Vallée as Le policier
- Jacques Varennes as Stanik

== Bibliography ==
- Bessy, Maurice & Chirat, Raymond. Histoire du cinéma français: 1935-1939. Pygmalion, 1986.
- Crisp, Colin. Genre, Myth and Convention in the French Cinema, 1929-1939. Indiana University Press, 2002.
- Rège, Philippe. Encyclopedia of French Film Directors, Volume 1. Scarecrow Press, 2009.
