= Marcel Lévesque =

French actor (1877–1962)

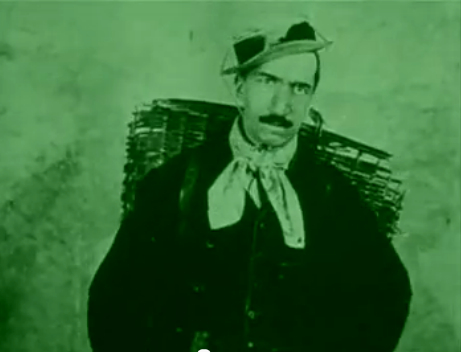
Marcel Lévesque in the 1916 serial Les Vampires

Marcel Lévesque (6 December 1877 – 16 February 1962) was a French film actor.

Born Joseph Marcel Lévesque in Paris, he died in Couilly-Pont-aux-Dames.

== Selected filmography ==
Year	Title	Role	Notes
1915	Les Vampires	Oscar Mazamette	French silent film serial
1916	Judex	Alfred Cocantin	French silent film serial
1918	La Nouvelle Mission de Judex	Alfred Cocantin	French silent film serial
1923	La dama de Chez Maxim's	Doctor Petypon	Italian silent film
1925	Take Care of Amelia		Italian silent film
1927	Floretta and Patapon	Patapon	Italian silent film
1931	All That's Not Worth Love (Tout ça ne vaut pas l'amour)	Jules Renaudin	French comedy drama
1933	The Heir of the Bal Tabarin (L'héritier du Bal Tabarin)	Pépin-Mounette	French comedy
1935	The Coquelet Affair (L'affaire Coquelet)	Monsieur Coquelet	French comedy
1936	Le Crime de Monsieur Lange (Le Crime de Monsieur Lange)	The concierge	French drama
1936	Let's Make a Dream (Faisons un rêve)	Un invité	French romantic comedy
1942	La Nuit fantastique (La Nuit fantastique)	Doctor Le Tellier	French fantasy
1943	Summer Light (Lumière d'été)	Monsieur Louis	French drama
1945	Majestic Hotel Cellars (Les caves du Majestic)	Le directeur de l'Agence Internationale	French crime
1951	Adhémar (Adhémar ou le jouet de la fatalité)	Brunel-Lacaze	French comedy
