= Paris-New York =

1940 film

- Directed by: Yves Mirande; Claude Heymann; Georges Lacombe
- Written by: Yves Mirande
- Starring: Gaby Morlay; Michel Simon; André Lefaur
- Cinematography: Willy Faktorovitch; Roger Hubert
- Edited by: Andrée Danis
- Music by: Henri Casadesus
- Production company: Regina Films
- Distributed by: Filmsonor
- Release date: 3 April 1940
- Running time: 90 minutes
- Country: France
- Language: French

Paris-New York (French: Paris New-York) is a 1940 French comedy crime film directed by Yves Mirande, Claude Heymann and Georges Lacombe. It stars Gaby Morlay, Michel Simon and André Lefaur. It was shot at the Cité Elgé studios in Paris and aboard the SS Normandie. The film's sets were designed by the art director Andrej Andrejew. It was produced during the Phoney War period and released shortly before the Fall of France.

== Synopsis ==
During an Atlantic crossing aboard a liner, a variety of passengers interact including an Inspector escorting a precious diamond, another Sûreté officer on an investigation, several criminals, a journalist in love with the daughter of an American banker and her disapproving father whose disappearance leads to suspicions he has been murdered. In addition the diamond also goes missing on the voyage.

== Cast ==
- Gaby Morlay as Gaby
- Michel Simon as L'inspecteur Boucheron
- André Lefaur as Deloisel
- Claude Dauphin as Paul Landry
- Jacques Baumer as Le commissaire Lambert
- Jules Berry as Le manager Sinclair
- Simone Berriau as Lydia de Saintonge
- Gisèle Préville as Jane Billingham
- René Alexandre as Billingham
- Aimé Clariond as M. de Saintonge
- Maurice Escande as Conrad
- Marcel Simon as Léopold Castagnères
- Marguerite Pierry as Mme Castagnères
- Léon Arvel
- Rivers Cadet as Un employé
- Lise Courbet as Miss Deauville
- René Fleur as Le commissaire de bord
- Robert Ozanne as Le barman
- Philippe Richard as Le commandant
- Noël Roquevert as Un policier
- Denise Vernac

== Bibliography ==
- Dayna Oscherwitz & MaryEllen Higgins. The A to Z of French Cinema. Scarecrow Press, 2009.
