= The Two Boys (1936 film) =

- Directed by: Fernand Rivers
- Written by: Pierre Decourcelle (novel)
- Produced by: Fernand Rivers
- Cinematography: Jean Bachelet
- Edited by: Jacques Desagneaux
- Music by: Tiarko Richepin
- Production company: Les Films Fernand Rivers
- Distributed by: D.U.C.
- Release date: 9 September 1936
- Running time: 115 minutes
- Country: France
- Language: French

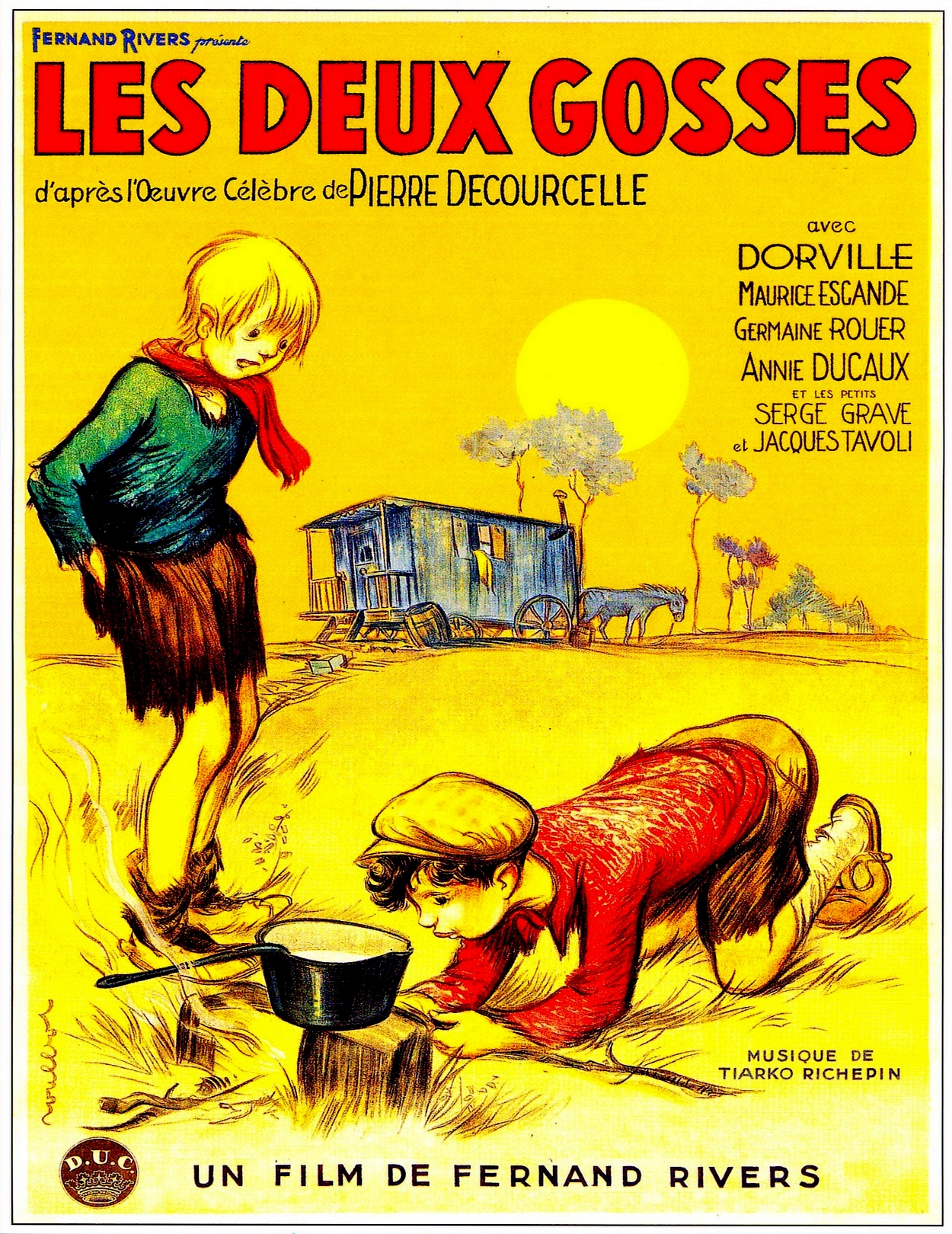
French poster of the movie by Francisque Poulbot.

The Two Boys (French: Les deux gosses) is a 1936 French drama film directed by Fernand Rivers. It is based on the 1880 novel of the same name by Pierre Decourcelle, which had previously been made into a silent film The Two Boys.

The film's sets were designed by Robert Gys.

== Cast ==
- Paul Barge
- Rivers Cadet as Mulot
- Lucienne Cauvières as Soeur Simplice
- Dorville as La Limace
- Annie Ducaux as Colette
- Maurice Escande as Georges de Kerlor
- Serge Grave as Claudinet
- Jean Heuzé as Brisquet
- Armand Lurville as Saint-Hyriex
- Louise Marquet as Brigitte
- Rolla Norman as Jacques d'Alboise
- Marguerite Pierry as Zéphyrine
- Augustine Prieur as Victoire
- Rogers as Fadard
- Germaine Rouer as Hélène de Kerlor
- Robert Seller as Firmin
- Marcel Seulin as Le petit Claude
- Jacques Tavoli as Fanfan
- Jean-Pierre Thisse as Le petit Jean

== Bibliography ==
- Goble, Alan. The Complete Index to Literary Sources in Film. Walter de Gruyter, 1999.
