= The Night Is My Kingdom =

- Directed by: Georges Lacombe
- Written by: Marcel Rivet; Charles Spaak
- Produced by: Pierre Gérin
- Starring: Jean Gabin; Simone Valère; Gérard Oury
- Cinematography: Philippe Agostini
- Edited by: Suzanne Rondeau; Henri Taverna
- Music by: Yves Baudrier
- Production company: Les Productions Cinématographiques
- Distributed by: DisCina
- Release date: 9 August 1951
- Running time: 110 minutes
- Country: France
- Language: French

The Night Is My Kingdom (French: La nuit est mon royaume) is a 1951 French drama film directed by Georges Lacombe and starring Jean Gabin, Simone Valère and Gérard Oury. Gabin was awarded the Volpi Cup for Best Actor at the 1951 Venice Film Festival. It was shot at the Saint-Maurice Studios in Paris. The film's sets were designed by the art directors Rino Mondellini and René Moulaert.

== Main cast ==
- Jean Gabin as Raymond Pinsard
- Simone Valère as Louise Louveau
- Gérard Oury as Lionel Moreau
- Jacques Dynam as Jean Gaillard
- Marthe Mercadier as Simone
- Cécile Didier as Mme. Pinsard
- Marcelle Arnold as Germaine Latour
- Paul Azaïs as Loustaud
- Georges Lannes as Dr. Vaugeois
- Robert Arnoux as Julien Latour
- Suzanne Dehelly as Soeur Gabrielle
- Maurice Pallatier
- Philippe Richard as Le directeur
- Rivers Cadet as Le père de Simone
- Madeleine Gérôme as La mére
- Colette Régis as Mme Turgot

== Bibliography ==
- Aitken, Ian. The Concise Routledge Encyclopedia of the Documentary Film. Routledge, 2013.
