= The Coquelet Affair =

1935 film

- Directed by: Jean Gourguet
- Written by: Jean Périne
- Produced by: Charles-Félix Tavano; Jean Gourguet
- Starring: Marcel Lévesque; Alice Tissot; Paul Pauley
- Cinematography: Christian Matras
- Music by: Charles Ferret
- Production company: Synchro-Ciné
- Release date: 8 March 1935
- Running time: 87 minutes
- Country: France
- Language: French

The Coquelet Affair (French: L'affaire Coquelet) is a 1935 French comedy film directed by Jean Gourguet and starring Marcel Lévesque, Alice Tissot and Paul Pauley. The film was shot at the Courbevoie Studios in Paris. It was an early film role for the Corsican singer Tino Rossi.

== Synopsis ==
Monsieur Coquelet is a keen collector of historical garters. When he discovers that the most valuable item in his collection is missing, he calls out both the police and the gendarmerie to hunt down the thief.

== Cast ==
- Marcel Lévesque as Monsieur Coquelet
- Alice Tissot as Hortense Coquelet
- Paul Pauley as Piedalouette
- Vivian Grey as Colette
- Robert Le Vigan as Poireau, le jardinier
- Fernand René as Moulard
- Albert Duvaleix as Le commissaire
- Violette Jordens as La femme de chambre
- Jane Pierson as Léontine, la cuisinière
- Tino Rossi as Jean Clairval
- Monette Dinay as Justine

== Bibliography ==
- Crisp, Colin. French Cinema—A Critical Filmography: Volume 1, 1929–1939. Indiana University Press, 2015.
- Rège, Philippe. Encyclopedia of French Film Directors, Volume 1. Scarecrow Press, 2009.
