= Armand Lurville =

French actor (1875–1955)

- Born: 21 March 1875; Paris, France
- Died: 25 September 1955 (aged 80); Paris, France
- Occupation: Actor
- Years active: 1909–1955 (film)

Armand Lurville (March 21, 1875 – September 25, 1955) was a French stage and film actor. A character actor, he appeared in a number of films from the silent era to the 1950s.

== Selected filmography ==
- Wedding Night (1920)
- The Passion of Joan of Arc (1928)
- Hai-Tang (1930)
- The Dressmaker of Luneville (1932)
- Nights in Port Said (1932)
- The Heir of the Bal Tabarin (1933)
- Nothing But Lies (1933)
- The Lady of the Camellias (1934)
- Pasteur (1935)
- Moses and Solomon, Perfumers (1935)
- Bach the Detective (1936)
- The Two Boys (1936)
- The Bureaucrats (1936)
- Hélène (1936)
- Ménilmontant (1936)
- The Marriages of Mademoiselle Levy (1936)
- Mollenard (1938)
- Four in the Morning (1938)
- A Lover's Return (1946)
- The Captain (1946)
- Ruy Blas (1948)
- Gervaise (1956)

== Bibliography ==
- Goble, Alan. The Complete Index to Literary Sources in Film. Walter de Gruyter, 1999.
- Waldman, Harry. Missing Reels: Lost Films of American and European Cinema. McFarland, 2000.
