= The Dressmaker of Luneville =

1932 film

- Directed by: Harry Lachman
- Written by: Alfred Savoir (play)
- Starring: Madeleine Renaud; Pierre Blanchar; Jeanne Fusier-Gir
- Cinematography: Rudolph Maté
- Music by: Marcel Lattès
- Production company: Les Studios Paramount
- Distributed by: Les Films Paramount
- Release date: 15 April 1932
- Running time: 95 minutes
- Country: France
- Language: French

The Dressmaker of Luneville (French: La couturière de Lunéville) is a 1932 French comedy film directed by Harry Lachman and starring Madeleine Renaud, Pierre Blanchar and Jeanne Fusier-Gir. It was made at the Joinville Studios by the French subsidiary of Paramount Pictures. Fox later bought the rights to the film and remade it as Dressed to Thrill in 1935.

== Synopsis ==
A young dressmaker is so distraught when she is abandoned by her lover that she contemplates suicide. Instead she goes to America and becomes a big star under the stage name Irene Salvago. Returning to Paris, she encounters her former love who doesn't recognise her. She decides to gain her revenge by making him fall in love with her.

== Cast ==
- Madeleine Renaud as Anna Tripied / Irene Salvago
- Pierre Blanchar as Claude Roland
- Jeanne Fusier-Gir as Léonie
- Armand Lurville as Silbur
- Monique Rolland
- R. Dock
- Billy Milton
- Jean Gobet
- Pierre Labry

== Bibliography ==
- Segrave, Kerry. Foreign Films in America: A History. McFarland, 2004.
