= Marcel Simon (actor) =

French actor

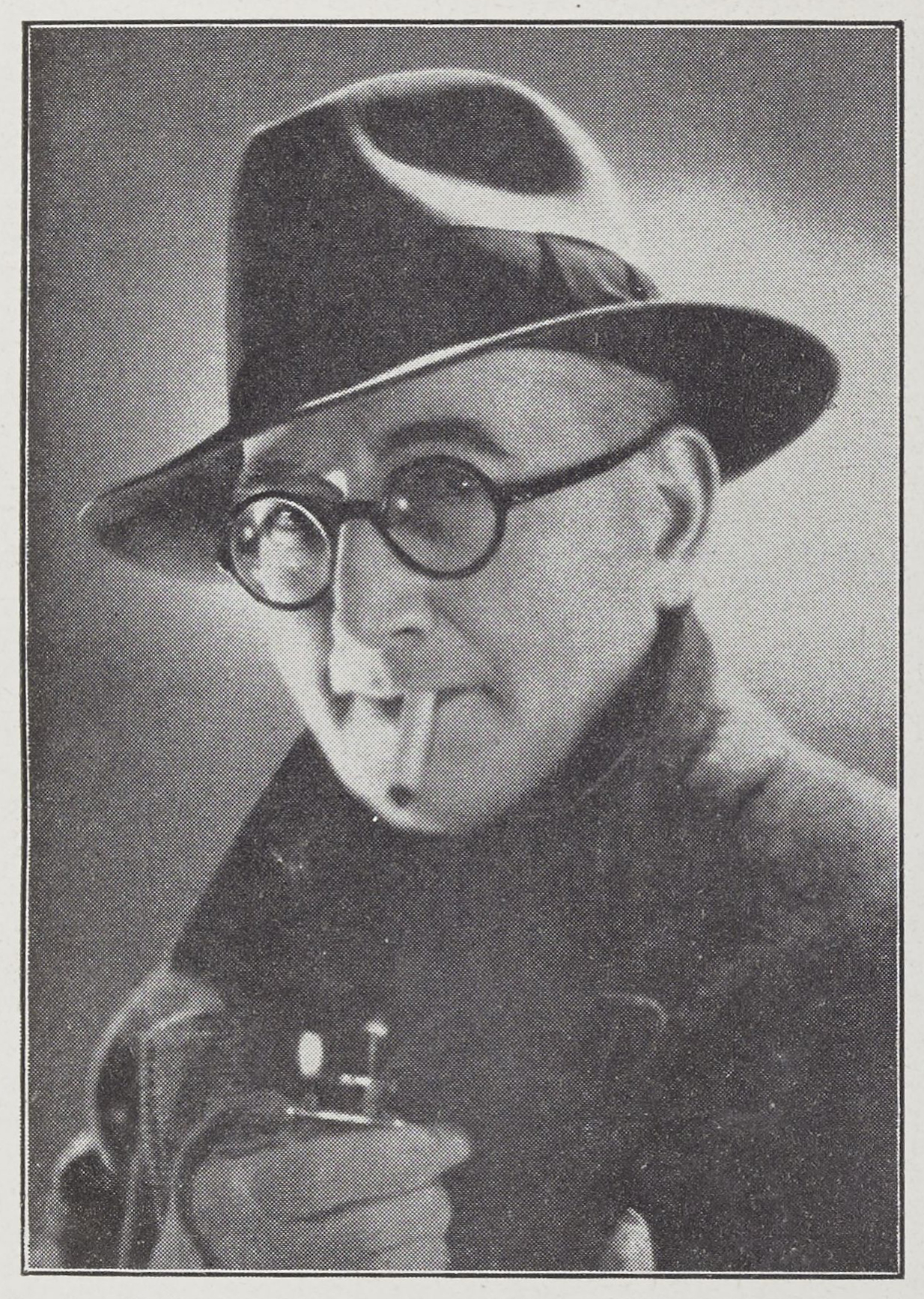
- Simon in 1938.
- Born: 31 August 1872; Brussels, Belgium
- Died: 16 October 1958 (aged 86); Paris, France
- Occupation: Actor
- Years active: 1908–1950 (film)

Marcel Simon (August 31, 1872 – October 16, 1958) was a Belgian stage and film actor, active in France. His screen career began in the silent era lasting until his final appearance in The Treasure of Cantenac (1950). An early role was that of Joseph Rouletabille in two films by Maurice Tourneur, but during the sound era he played supporting roles as a character. On stage he originated several parts in the farces of Georges Feydeau, of whom he was a friend.

== Selected filmography ==
- The Mystery of the Yellow Room (1913)
- Wedding Night (1920)
- The Man at Midnight (1931)
- The Invisible Woman (1933)
- Paris-Soleil (1933)
- Donogoo (1936)
- Sacré Léonce (1936)
- On the Road (1936)
- With a Smile (1936)
- The Club of Aristocrats (1937)
- Mademoiselle ma mère (1937)
- Alexis, Gentleman Chauffeur (1938)
- Katia (1938)
- Trois artilleurs en vadrouille (1938)
- Café de Paris (1938)
- Monsieur Breloque Has Disappeared (1938)
- Behind the Facade (1939)
- Paris-New York (1940)
- Moulin Rouge (1941)
- Boule de Suif (1945)
- The Treasure of Cantenac (1950)

== Bibliography ==
- Baker, Stuart Eddy. Georges Feydeau and the Aesthetics of Farce. UMI Research Press, 1981.
- Goble, Alan. The Complete Index to Literary Sources in Film. Walter de Gruyter, 1999.
- Sassoon, Donald. The Culture of the Europeans: From 1800 to the Present. HarperPress, 2006.
