= Floretta and Patapon (1927 film) =

1927 film directed by Amleto Palermi

Florette and Patapon
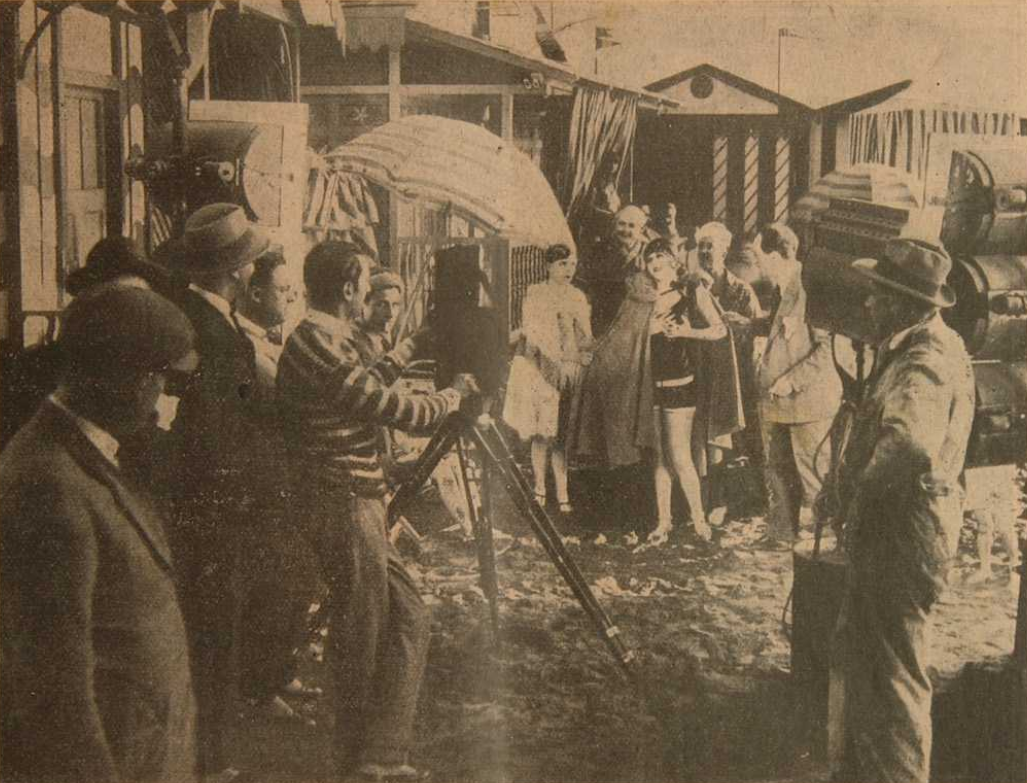
- Behind the scenes
- Directed by: Amleto Palermi
- Written by: Maurice Hennequin (play); Pierre Veber (play); Amleto Palermi
- Starring: Ossi Oswalda; Livio Pavanelli; Marcel Lévesque
- Cinematography: Antonio Cufaro; Umberto della Valle
- Production company: Palermi Film
- Distributed by: S.A.C.I.
- Release date: 6 October 1927
- Country: Italy
- Languages: Silent; Italian intertitles

Floretta and Patapon (Italian: Florette e Patapon) is a 1927 Italian silent comedy film directed by Amleto Palermi and starring Ossi Oswalda, Livio Pavanelli and Marcel Lévesque. It is a remake of the 1913 film of the same title.

== Cast ==
- Ossi Oswalda as Riquette, moglie di Florette
- Livio Pavanelli as Florette
- Marcel Lévesque as Patapon
- Enrica Fantis as Bianca, moglie di Patapon
- Augusto Bandini as Il primo amore
- Lucia Zanussi as La cocottina
- Armand Pouget as Il colonello Mombissac
- Ubaldo Cocchi as Jambart
- Oreste Bilancia as Il cassiere
- Alfredo Martinelli

== Bibliography ==
- Stewart, John. Italian Film: A Who's Who. McFarland, 1994.
