= Fernand Rivers =

French actor, screenwriter, film producer and director

Fernand Rivers (born François Large, 6 September 1879, Saint-Lager - 12 September 1960) was a French actor, screenwriter, film producer and director. He was the brother of the actor Rivers Cadet.

== Partial filmography ==
=== Director ===
- The Ironmaster (1933)
- The Lady of the Camellias (1934)
- Pasteur (1935)
- The Two Boys (1936) adaptation of the novel by Pierre Decourcelle
- Boissière (1937)
- Four in the Morning (1938)
- The President (1938)
- Berlingot and Company (1939)
- Cyrano de Bergerac (1946)
- The Ironmaster (1948)
- The Ladies in the Green Hats (1949)
- Dirty Hands (1951)

=== Producer ===
- Wedding Night (1920)
- Compliments of Mister Flow (1936)
- Last Adventure (1942)
- Shot in the Night (1943)
- Trial at the Vatican (1952)
- The Road to Damascus (1952)
- Adam Is Eve (1954)
- Blood to the Head (1956)
