= Compliments of Mister Flow =

1936 film by Robert Siodmak

- Directed by: Robert Siodmak
- Written by: Henri Jeanson; Károly Nóti
- Based on: Mister Flow by Gaston Leroux
- Produced by: Fernand Rivers
- Starring: Fernand Gravey; Edwige Feuillère; Louis Jouvet
- Cinematography: Jean Bachelet; René Gaveau; André Thomas
- Edited by: Jean Mamy
- Music by: Michel Michelet
- Production company: Vondas Films
- Distributed by: Compagnie Universelle Cinématographique
- Release date: 2 December 1936
- Running time: 100 minutes
- Country: France
- Language: French

Compliments of Mister Flow or Mister Flow is a 1936 French mystery film directed by Robert Siodmak and starring Fernand Gravey, Edwige Feuillère and Louis Jouvet. It was based on the 1927 novel Mister Flow by Gaston Leroux. It was shot at the Billancourt Studios in Paris. The film's sets were designed by the art directors Robert Gys and Léon Barsacq.

== Cast ==
- Fernand Gravey as Antonin Rose
- Edwige Feuillère as Lady Helena Scarlett
- Louis Jouvet as Durin / Mr. Flow
- Jean Périer as Lord Philippe Scarlett
- Vladimir Sokoloff as Merlow
- Jim Gérald as Le Cubain
- Jean Wall as Pierre
- Mila Parély as Marceline
- Victor Vina as Garber
- Philippe Richard as Le procureur
- Tsugundo Maki as Maki
- Yves Gladine as Un inspecteur
- Marguerite de Morlaye
- Myno Burney
- Léon Arvel
- Georges Cahuzac

== Bibliography ==
- Greco, Joseph. The File on Robert Siodmak in Hollywood, 1941-1951. Universal-Publishers, 1999.
