= Wedding Night (1920 film) =

1920 film

- Directed by: Marcel Simon
- Based on: Une nuit de noces by Albert Barré and Henri Kéroul
- Starring: Yvonne Chazel; Armand Lurville; Fernand Rivers
- Production company: Pathé Frères
- Distributed by: Pathé Frères
- Release date: 12 March 1920
- Country: France
- Languages: Silent; French intertitles

Wedding Night (French: Une nuit de noces) is a 1920 French silent comedy film directed by Marcel Simon and starring Yvonne Chazel, Armand Lurville and Fernand Rivers. It is based on the play of the same title by Albert Barré and Henri Kéroul later adapted into a 1935 film and 1950 film.

== Cast ==
- Yvonne Chazel as Sidonie de Valpurgis
- Armand Lurville as Laverdet
- Brunais as Duportal
- Fernand Rivers as Gaston Durocel
- Annette Grange as Simone Duportal
- Henriette Miller as Mme Duportal
- Jeanne Dyris as Mme Laverdet

== Bibliography ==
- Bousquet, Henri. De Pathé Frères à Pathé Cinéma: 1919, 1920, 1921, 1922. 1999.
- Goble, Alan. The Complete Index to Literary Sources in Film. Walter de Gruyter, 1999.
- Martinelli, Vittorio. Cuor d'oro e muscoli d'acciaio: il cinema francese degli anni Venti e la critica italiana. La cineteca del Friuli, 2000.
