= A Gentleman of the Ring (1926 film) =

1926 film

- Directed by: Gaston Ravel
- Written by: Jacques Bousquet (play); Alex Madis
- Produced by: Jean de Merly
- Starring: André Roanne; Olga Day; André Lefaur
- Cinematography: Lucien Bellavoine; Amédée Morrin
- Production company: Gaston Ravel
- Distributed by: Exclusivités Jean de Merly
- Release date: 1 March 1926
- Country: France
- Languages: Silent; French intertitles

A Gentleman of the Ring (French:Chouchou poids plume) is a 1926 French silent sports film directed by Gaston Ravel and starring André Roanne, Olga Day and André Lefaur. It was remade as a sound film in 1932.

It was released in Britain in 1927 by Stoll Pictures. The film's sets were designed by Tony Lekain.

== Cast ==
- André Roanne as Chouchou
- Olga Day as Diana Benson
- André Lefaur as Le comte Brodelet de Surville
- Chriss Lee as Jim
- Juanita de Frézia as La comtesse de Surville
- Simone Mareuil as Moineau
- Reine Derns as La femme du manager
- Pionnier as Battling Tatave
- Frank Hall as Le sparring-partner
- Raymond Lauzerte as Une compagne de fête
- Frédérique Soule as Une compagne de fête
- Pierrette Raff as Une compagne de fête
- Nicolas Redelsperger as Une compagne de fête
- Bernhard as Le manager

== Bibliography ==
- Powrie, Phil & Rebillard, Éric. Pierre Batcheff and stardom in 1920s French cinema. Edinburgh University Press, 2009
