= Simone Mareuil =

French actress (1903–1954)

- Mareuil in a still from Un Chien Andalou.
- Born: Marie Louise Simone Vacher; 25 August 1903; Périgueux, Dordogne, France
- Died: 24 October 1954 (aged 51); Périgueux, Dordogne, France
- Other name: Simonne
- Occupation: Actress
- Spouse: Philippe Hersent

Simone Mareuil (French pronunciation: [simɔn maʁøj]; 25 August 1903 – 24 October 1954) was a French actress best known for appearing in Luis Buñuel and Salvador Dali's surrealist film Un Chien Andalou (1929).

== Biography ==
Mareuil was born Marie Louise Simonne Vacher in Périgueux, France, on August 25, 1903. Her mother was Marie Marguerite Soulet (aged 25), and her father was François Vacher (aged 38), a captain in the 50th Infantry regiment and prominent figure in the First World War. She had a brother named Raymond.

In 1925, she and her parents moved to Paris. A friend introduced her to Paul Caroux, a collaborator of Louis Feuillade, the leading director at Gaumont Studios. This led Simone to her first uncredited roles as extras in various films, working behind stars including Blanche Montel, Suzanne Bianchetti, Pierre Blanchar, Armand Tallier, Laurence Myrga, Paul Ollivier, Sessue Hayakawa, and Roger Karl.

On June 15, 1940, she married actor Philippe Hersent.

After the Second World War, she settled with her mother in Coursac near Périgueux. She subsequently fell into a depression after losing her father and her brother Raymond, and dealing with her own divorce. She died by suicide on October 24, 1954, after dousing herself in gasoline and burning herself to death.

She is buried in the Cimetière du Nord in Périgueux.

== Filmography ==
Year	Title	Director
1924	L'Ombre du bonheur	Gaston Roudès
1924	La Galerie des monstres	Jaque Catelain
1925	Les Murailles du silence	Louis de Carbonnat
1926	A Gentleman of the Ring	Gaston Ravel
1926	Le Juif errant	Luitz Morat
1926	Le noël du mousse (short film)	Félix Léonnec
1927	La petite chocolatière	René Hervil
1927	Genêt d'Espagne	Rainer Gérard-Ortvin
1928	Poker d'as	Henri Desfontaines
1929	La Fée moderne, aka Prospérité (short film)	Jean Benoît-Lévy
1929	The Ladies in the Green Hats	André Berthomieu
1929	Un Chien Andalou	Luis Buñuel
1930	Quand Mandelon (short film)	Charles-Félix Tavano
1930	Our Masters, the Servants	Hewitt Claypoole Grantham-Hayes
1931	The Polish Jew	Jean Kemm
1931	Heart of Paris	Jean Benoít-Lévy & Marie Epstein
1932	Le Soir des rois	Jean Daumery
1933	Miss Helyett	Jean Kemm
1933	Mariage à responsabilité limitée	Jean de Limur
1933	The Heir of the Bal Tabarin	Jean Kemm
1933	Une drôle de maison (short film)	Jean-Louis Bouquet
1936	The Lover of Madame Vidal	André Berthomieu
1937	Le Doigt du destin (short film)	Christian Herman
1938	Neuf de trèfle	Lucien Mayrargue
1939	Sur le plancher des vaches	Pierre-Jean Ducis

== See also ==
- Surrealist Cinema
