= André Heuzé =

French screenwriter and film director (1880-1942)

- Born: 5 December 1880; Saint-Arnoult-en-Yvelines
- Died: 16 August 1942 (aged 61); Paris
- Other name: André Heuse
- Citizenship: France
- Occupations: movie director, screenwriter and playwright

André Heuzé, or sometimes André Heuse, (5 December 1880, in Saint-Arnoult-en-Yvelines – 16 August 1942 in Paris) was a French movie director, screenwriter and playwright.

== Filmography ==
=== Director ===
- 1906: La Course à la perruque
- 1908: Mon pantalon est décousu
- 1912: Le Sursis
- 1912: Ma concierge est trop jolie
- 1913: De film... en aiguilles
- 1914: Le Bossu
- 1916: Debout les morts !

=== Screenwriter ===
- 1905 : Dix femmes pour un mari by Georges Hatot, Lucien Nonguet and Ferdinand Zecca
- 1905 : Le Voleur de bicyclette
- 1906 : Boireau déménage
- 1906 : Chiens contrebandiers
- 1906 : Drame passionnel by Albert Capellani
- 1906 : La Course à la perruque
- 1906 : La Femme du lutteur by Albert Capellani
- 1906 : La Fille du sonneur by Albert Capellani
- 1906 : La Grève des bonnes
- 1906 : La Voix de la conscience by Albert Capellani
- 1906 : La Loi du pardon by Albert Capellani
- 1906 : L'Âge du cœur by Albert Capellani
- 1906 : Le Billet de faveur
- 1906 : Les Débuts d'un chauffeur
- 1906 : Les Dessous de Paris
- 1906 : Les Étudiants de Paris
- 1906 : Les Malheurs de Madame Durand
- 1906 : Les Meurt-de-faim
- 1906 : Mortelle Idylle by Albert Capellani
- 1907 : À Biribi, disciplinaires français
- 1907 : La Course des belles-mères
- 1907 : La Course des sergents de ville
- 1907 : La Grève des nourrices
- 1907 : La Lutte pour la vie
- 1907 : La Mort d'un toréador
- 1907 : La Vengeance du forgeron
- 1907 : Les Femmes cochers
- 1908 : Le Cheval emballé
- 1908 : Mon pantalon est décousu
- 1913 : De film... en aiguilles
- 1918 : Un duel à la dynamite
- 1931 : En bordée
- 1935 : Le Champion de ces dames
- 1936 : Le Roman d'un spahi
- 1937 : Madelon's Daughter
- 1937 : Les Chevaliers de la cloche
- 1938 : Ceux de demain
- 1946 : The Diary of a Chambermaid, coauthor of the stage adaptation

=== Actor ===
- 1923: La Rue du pavé d'amour by André Hugon
- 1928: Little Devil May Care as André Bucaille
- 1928: La grande épreuve as Roger Duchêne

== Playwright ==
- 1905: Ali-Gaga, ou du Quarante à l'heure, vaudeville in 1 act
- 1909: Tous papas, comédie-vaudeville in 1 act, with Louis Feuillade
- 1913: La Petite Manon, opéra-comique in 4 acts, with Maurice Ordonneau
- 1919 La Ceinture électrique, vaudeville in 1 act, with Etienne Arnaud
- 1923: Lulu, garde ton cœur !, vaudeville in 3 acts, with Etienne Arnaud
- 1929: En bordée, vaudeville in 3 acts, with Pierre Veber
- 1930: L'Avant de ces dames, vaudeville in trois acts, with Pierre Veber
- 1931: Le Roman d'une femme de chambre, 3-act play cowritten with André de Lorde after the novel by Octave Mirbeau
- 1932: Bonsoir Paris, operetta
- La Madone des sleepings, with André de Lorde, after Maurice Dekobra
- Ma tante la moukère, with Étienne Arnaud
