= Eric Tigerstedt =

Finnish inventor (1887–1925)

Eric M. C. Tigerstedt
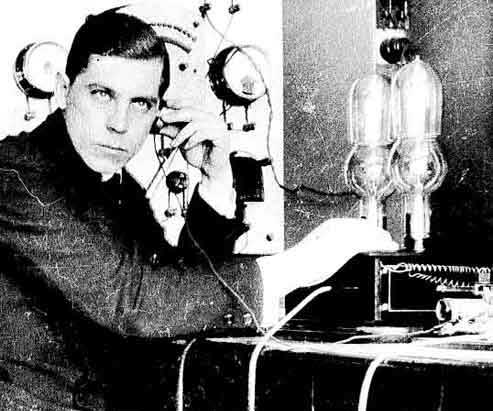
- Tigerstedt in 1915
- Born: Eric Magnus Campbell Tigerstedt; August 14, 1887; Helsinki, Grand Duchy of Finland, Russian Empire
- Died: April 20, 1925 (aged 37); New York City, U.S.
- Occupation: Inventor
- Spouse: Ingrid Lignell
- Children: 1

Eric Magnus Campbell Tigerstedt (August 14, 1887 – April 20, 1925) was a Finnish inventor best known as one of the most significant inventors in Finland at the beginning of the 20th century and has been called the "Thomas Edison of Finland". He was a pioneer of sound-on-film technology and made significant improvements to the amplification capacity of the vacuum valve. Having seen a showing of the Lumière brothers' new motion picture technology as a nine-year-old boy in Helsinki in 1896, he was inspired to bring sound to silent pictures.

Many years later, in 1914, his demonstration film Word and Picture was presented to a gathering of scientific dignitaries in Berlin, but his invention was never commercialized. In addition to improving the triode vacuum valve, he developed directional loudspeakers. Tigerstedt also predicted such future inventions as television and he invented the mobile phone, for which he in 1917 successfully filed a patent. The patent was granted to Tigerstedt for what he described as a "pocket-size folding telephone with a very thin carbon microphone". Tigerstedt was awarded a total of 71 patents in several countries between the years 1912 and 1924.

== Life ==
=== Early interest in technology ===
Tigerstedt was born in Helsinki and started to show a particular interest in all technical things at an early age. He studied his father's scientific books with great interest, and at age 11 he built a simple photographic device. At age 13, he began experimenting with other technical devices and machines, and he built his own version of an electric motor and electrical batteries. After a falling out with his father, he left home at the age of 15, supporting himself by working as a handyman and technician in mechanical workshops and shipyards in Helsinki. He later worked as a technician in the telephone industry, which was rapidly becoming a major business in Helsinki at that time.

=== Studies in Germany ===
In 1908, Tigerstedt moved to Germany to continue his studies. He completed his high school education and began studies in electrical engineering at the Friedrichs Polytechnikum in Köthen. After completing his studies there in 1911, he moved back to Finland with his fiancée Marjatta Nybom, whom he had met and fallen in love with while in Köthen. She had been studying the violin in Switzerland and met Tigerstedt through her brother Albert Nybom, who was also studying in Köthen and was a classmate of Tigerstedt. However, the engagement between Tigerstedt and Marjatta Nybom was broken off in 1912.

=== Sound-on-film prototype ===
After returning to Finland, he continued his experiments and succeeded in building a prototype of sound-on-film technology ("talking movies"). Tigerstedt then returned to Germany in 1913 and founded a company with the Swedish merchant Axel Wahlstedt and the Swedish engineer Hugo Swartling. This was the first in a series of unsuccessful business ventures. Although Tigerstedt was able to complete his work with the sound-on-film technology, the partners' laboratory was eventually confiscated due to unpaid rent. They managed to reclaim their laboratory, but it was then destroyed in a fire. The cooperation between Wahlstedt and Tigerstedt became strained and in January 1914 they dissolved their company. After breaking off their commercial partnership, Wahlstedt returned to Sweden, while Tigerstedt stayed behind in Berlin, more or less broke.

=== Demonstration of sound-on-film ===
Tigerstedt continued working on his sound-on-film technology and made progress in solving a major technical problem, that of how to amplify film audio sufficiently to fill a large theatre or hall. He did this by making major improvements to the vacuum tube design of Lee de Forest, increasing the amplification capacity substantially. In February–March 1914, Tigerstedt demonstrated his sound-on-film technology to a small group of scientists, using his own film Word and Picture.

=== 1914–1917 ===
After being expelled from Germany in July 1914, Tigerstedt returned to Finland, but he moved to Sweden a few months later and then to Denmark in 1915. After another unsuccessful business venture, Tigerstedt once more returned to Finland. In 1917, he moved back to Denmark and founded yet another company, which was then sold. After that, he participated in the founding of the Norwegian company A/S Anod, in which he held a 45% stake.

=== Finnish Civil War of 1918 ===
As a Finnish citizen, Tigerstedt was called back to take part in the Finnish Civil War of 1918, and on 14 February 1918 he was on his way back to Finland. After the cessation of hostilities, he participated in the victory parade on 16 May 1918, but then returned to Denmark, where he married Ingrid Lignell in 1919. Their son Carl Axel Waldemar was born in 1921. However, their marriage soon began to deteriorate, and they separated not long after the birth of their son.

=== Loss of German patents ===
During World War I, Germany invalidated all of Tigerstedt's patents. After the war, he received compensation from the German government, but the sum quickly became worthless due to the hyperinflation in Germany during 1921 to 1923. In 1922, Tigerstedt moved his laboratory to Finland and founded a new company called "Tigerstedts patenter", which however also failed.

=== Move to the United States ===
In 1923, Tigerstedt moved to the United States where he founded his last company, the Tiger Manufacturing Co., to produce small radio receivers and cryptographic devices. The Mexican government purchased two of the cryptographic devices, and the radio receivers also sold relatively well. Tigerstedt had the opportunity to meet with the great American inventor Thomas Alva Edison, who wrote a letter of recommendation for Tigerstedt to the director of the Department of Commerce.

=== Death ===
When it finally seemed that Tigerstedt was on the verge of commercial success, he was involved in a car accident on April 20, 1924, when another car unexpectedly turned in front of the car Tigerstedt was travelling in. There were persistent rumours that a competitor had arranged for the accident, but there was never any proof of this.

Exactly one year later, on April 20, 1925, he succumbed to tuberculosis at the New York Fifth Avenue Hospital, possibly due to side effects from his injuries in the car accident. He wrote his last letter to his brother Göran, in which he described the state of his company, explained the structure of a new membrane that he was developing, and stated that he was about to undergo a kidney operation due to the spreading tuberculosis. Unfortunately, medical science was not advanced enough to be able to save his life. After his death, his brother travelled to America and brought his ashes home for burial in Helsinki. As with many inventors, Tigerstedt's inventions were never fully appreciated during his own lifetime. He is buried at the Hietaniemi Cemetery owned by the Lutheran Church of Finland.

== Inventions ==
Tigerstedt experimented in many areas. He developed a new version of the shotgun that could be fired using the thumbs and that counted the number of shots fired. Unfortunately, he was perennially short of funds, and he did not have enough financial standing to file for a patent.

=== Sound-on-film technology ===
Tigerstedt's greatest interest was in the field of sound recording. He had developed a prototype for recording sound on a metal wire as early as 1912 and was convinced that he could find a way to record sound directly on motion picture film. He started his first experiments in Helsinki using very primitive equipment. The sentence he attempted to record was in German: "Grau ist alle Theorie. Grün ist nur des Lebens Baum". Finally, he succeeded and he called his invention the "photomagnetophone". Unfortunately, his achievements did not gain any recognition, nor did he reap any financial gains from his invention, so he had to maintain a day job in order to earn a modest living and could only continue his experiments in the evenings and into the nights, sometimes working all through the night without any sleep. After meeting his former schoolmate Alfred Nybom in Berlin, he succeeded in using Nybom's connections to gain access to a research laboratory and employment as an inventor. Film with audio was recognised as a commercially promising field of endeavour, but Tigerstedt's invention needed further development before it could be commercialised. There was as yet no technology available to electronically amplify the audio signal sufficiently to fill a large movie theatre. Tigerstedt also enlarged his vision of video transmission in the future. He wrote: "There will come a time when people can sit at home and follow events in the world through a device I now call the 'electronic eye'. When people get used to film with sound, they will soon adopt the electric eye, or electrophtalmoscope". When his father learned of his thinking, he tried to persuade him to not let his imagination carry him away, " ... otherwise you will surely end your days in the asylum in Lapinlahti."

Tigerstedt returned to Germany in 1913 and continued developing the photomagnetophone, but there was still no solution to the problem of amplification. He experimented with early versions of the vacuum tube and eventually was able to amplify the sound, but with disappointing results.

Tigerstedt also continued developing the electrophtalmoscope. The prototype consisted of vibrating mirrors in both the sending and receiving apparatus, using the photoelectric properties of a selenium element at the sender and a light source at the receiving end which was modulated using a Faraday device. The received picture was supposed to be displayed on a movie screen. Two electrophtalmoscopes were built and an experiment was conducted using an electrical cable running from London to Berlin. Tigerstedt arranged several demonstrations and gained a reputation as a knowledgeable scientist.

=== Improving on Lee de Forest's vacuum tube ===
Tigerstedt stubbornly continued to grapple with the problems of the early vacuum tubes, which were inefficient, expensive and prone to breaking. His German colleagues told him that the vacuum tubes could not be developed further and that there could be no solution to the problem with the weakness of amplification. Tigerstedt, however, continued to experiment and eventually succeeded in substantially improving on the design of Lee De Forest, achieving much greater amplification than that of the original valves. Tigerstedt also patented his improvement of the triode vacuum valve, which consisted of improving the amplification by rearranging the electrodes cylindrically in the tube, changing the glass mold to prevent vacuum loss and using steel mirrors inside the tubes to prevent electrostatic interference. He had finally solved the most difficult practical problems of talking movies. It is worth noting that his achievement was purely experimental, as there were no prior experiments or mathematical models that he could have followed.

=== Patent for sound-on-film technology and expulsion from Germany ===
This was a major step forward for Tigerstedt, and he was soon able to show a film with sound which was electronically amplified and reproduced through a speaker system. Beginning in 1919, de Forest created his own sound-on-film system, which he called Phonofilm and which used some of Tigerstedt's concepts, along with some of the Tri-Ergon group and of inventor Theodore Case. Tigerstedt was awarded a German patent (number 309,536) on July 28, 1914, for his sound-on-film process.

One month later, Tigerstedt was summoned by the German authorities, told that he had been declared an unwanted Russian citizen, and given three days to leave the country. World War I had started and Finland was at that time part of the Russian empire, having been ceded to Russia after the 1808–1809 war between Sweden and Russia. As another consequence of the declaration of war between Russia and Germany, the German government invalidated all German patents held by citizens of enemy nations.

=== Ultrasound experiments ===
Tigerstedt moved to Denmark, where he continued working on film sound recording devices at the Petersen & Poulsen company. He befriended the Danish inventor Valdemar Poulsen (1869–1942), who was the inventor of the telegraphone steel wire magnetic recorder. Tigerstedt, too, had experimented with recording sound on a steel wire. He attempted to transmit speech across the Jutland straits using 30 kHz ultrasound, but the results were not promising. He also experimented with transmitting sound underwater, which was more successful, and he was eventually granted a patent for this process.

=== Communication device ===
A pilot suggested to Tigerstedt that he should develop a device to facilitate communication between two pilots while seated one behind the other in an open biplane. Tigerstedt invented a device which had a very small earpiece that could be plugged into the ear. Tigerstedt spent considerable time on designing the earpiece. The device was also found to be helpful to people who were hard of hearing, offering a possible alternative to the large ear trumpets then in use as hearing aids.

== See also ==
- Tri-Ergon
- Phonofilm
- Vitaphone
- RCA Photophone
- Photokinema
- Fox Movietone
- Joseph Tykociński-Tykociner
- Sound film
- sound-on-disc
- List of film formats
