= List of film sound systems =

The following is a list of film sound systems.

== Explanation ==
- The year shown may represent a patent or other developmental milestone rather than the first use in public.
- Technologically identical systems may have been promoted under different trade names by different commercial entities.

== Sound systems ==
Year	Name	Type	Discrete channels	Output channels
2002	12-Track Digital Sound	Digital	12	
2015	2-Track Digital Sound (REMBS)	Digital	2	
1953	3 Channel Stereo		3	L, C, R
1953	4-Track Stereo	Magnetic	4	L, R, C, S (<12kHz)
1955	6-Track Stereo	Magnetic	6	L, Lc, C, Rc, R, S
1934	Afifa Ton-Kopie			
1950	AGA Sound System			
1909	Animatophone		1	C
2010	Auro 11.1		6	12
1928	Aurofone			
2015	AuroMax			
1943	B.A.F. Sound System			
1907	Biophone	Phonograph	1	C
1938	Blue Seal Noiseless Recording			
1929	Bristolphone			
2001	Broadway Surround			
1909	Cameraphone		1	C
1921	Case	Optical	1	C
1990	Cinema Digital Sound	Digital	5.1	L, C, R, Ls, Rs, LFE (<114 Hz)
1974	Chace Surround			
1905	Chronophone	Phonograph	1	C
1910	Chronomegaphone	Phonograph	1	C
1907	Cinematophone	Phonograph	1	C
1904	Cinephone Powers		1	C
1904	Cinephone Lubin		1	C
1952	Cinerama 7-Track	Magnetic	7	L, Lc, C, Rc, R, SBL, SBR; L, Lc, C, Rc, R, SL+SR, SBL+SBR
1911	Cinephonograph		1	C
1949	Cinesound			
1904	Cinophone			
2010	Datasat Digital Sound			
1923	De Forest Phonofilm	Optical	1	C
2002	Digitrac Digital Audio System			
1975	Dolby Stereo	Optical	2	L, C, R, S
2012	Dolby Atmos	Digital	128	
1992	Dolby Digital	Digital	5.1	L, C, R, Ls, Rs, LFE
1999	Dolby Digital EX	Digital	5.1	L, C, R, Ls, Rs, Sbl, Sbr, LFE
1987	Dolby Stereo SR	Optical	2	L, C, R, S
2009	Dolby Surround 7.1	Digital	7.1	L, C, R, Ls, Rs, Sbl, Sbr, LFE
1993	DTS	Digital	5.1	L, C, R, Ls, Rs, LFE
1996	DTS 70 mm	Digital	6	L, C, R, Ls, Rs, Sbl, Sbr, LFE
2001	DTS-8			
1999	DTS-ES	Digital	6	L, C, R, Ls, Rs, Sbl, Sbr, LFE
1994	DTS-Stereo			
2015	DTS:X	Digital	13	
1996	DX Stereo			
1940	Fantasound	Optical	3	L, C, R, Ls, Rs, Sbl, Sbr
1929	Filmtone			
1998	Full Range Recording System			
1920	Gaumontphone			
1898	Hollmann–Eaves			
1973	IMAX 6-Track	Digital	6	
2014	IMAX 12-Track	Digital	12	
1933	International Recording Engineers System			
1992	Iwerks Digital Audio			
1894	Kinetophone (Dickson)	Phonograph	1	C
1888	Kinetophone (Edison)	Phonograph	1	C
1958	Kinopanorama 9-Track			
1913	Kinoplasticon			
1956	Klangfilm Magnetocord			
1954	Klangfilm-Stereocord			
1990	LC-Concept Digital Sound	Digital	5.1	L, C, R, Ls, Rs, LFE
1969	Li-Westrex System			
1979	Kintek Stereo			
1938	Magnaphone Western Electric			
1962	Magnetocord			
1988	Matrix Surround			
1904	Mono	Optical	1	C
1925	Movietone	Optical	1	C (<8500Hz)
1938	Optiphone			
1964	Ortiphone			
1907	Oskar Messter			
1949	Perspecta Stereo	Optical	1	L, C, R
1933	Phillips Sound			
1900	Phono-Bio-Taleaux		1	C
1900	Phono-Cinema-Theatre		1	C
1921	Phono-Kinema		1	C
1922	Phonofilm	Optical	1	C
1921	Photokinema	Phonograph	1	C
1925	Photophone (RCA)	Optical	1	C
1914	Polyscope	Phonograph	1	C
1936	Pulvári System			
1970	Quadrophonic			
1975	Quintaphonic			
1993	Sony Dynamic Digital Sound (SDDS)	Digital	8	L, Lc, C, Rc, R, Ls, Rs, LFE
1974	Sensurround	Optical, Magnetic	1, 4, 6	C, LFE; L, R, C, S (<12kHz), LFE; L, Lc, C, Rc, R, Ls, Rs, LFE
1992	Servotron Stereo			
1985	Sonics			
1996	Sonics-DDP			
1994	Sonix			
1928	Sonora-Bristolphone			
1977	Sound 360°			
1992	Sound Trax Surround Stereo			
1995	Soundelux			
1965	Spectra-Stereo			
1949	Stereo variable-area	Optical	2	L, R
1978	Super Space Sound			
1929	Synchrotone			
1939	Synthetic			
1932	Systemi A. Shorin			
1940	Système Cottet			
1933	Tagephone			
1983	THX Ltd.			
2005	TMH Labs 10.2 Channel Sound	Digital	12	L, Lh, Lc, C, Rc, Rh, R, Ls, Bs, Rs, LLFE, RLFE
1928	Tobis (Tonbild Syndicat)			
1922	Tri-Ergon Sound System 68 mm	Optical	1	C
1984	Ultra Stereo	Optical	2	L, C, R, S
1938	Variray Blue Seal Recording			
1935	Visatone			
1980	Vistasonic			
1925	Vitagraph			
1926	Vitaphone	Phonograph	1	C (<4300Hz)
1911	Vivaphone			
1921	Western Electric	Optical	1	C
1925	Westrex (Fox & Western Electric)	Optical, Magnetic	1	C
1938	Wicmar and Blue Seal Noiseless Recording			
1980	Megasound	Magnetic	6	L, C, R, Ls (>450Hz), Rs (>450Hz), LFE (<250 Hz)

== See also ==
- Film score
- Soundtrack
- Sound film
- Sound-on-film
- Movie projector; sound
- List of motion picture film formats

== Resources ==
- Sound mix list on the Internet Movie Database
- Index of early sound films of the silent era, from The Progressive Silent Film List by Carl Bennett
- The origins of the Firm "Tobis-Klang" The first release that used this system was the partially silent German film Melodie der Welt.
