= Dr. Sylvester Willard Mansion =

Historic house in New York, United States

- U.S. National Register of Historic Places
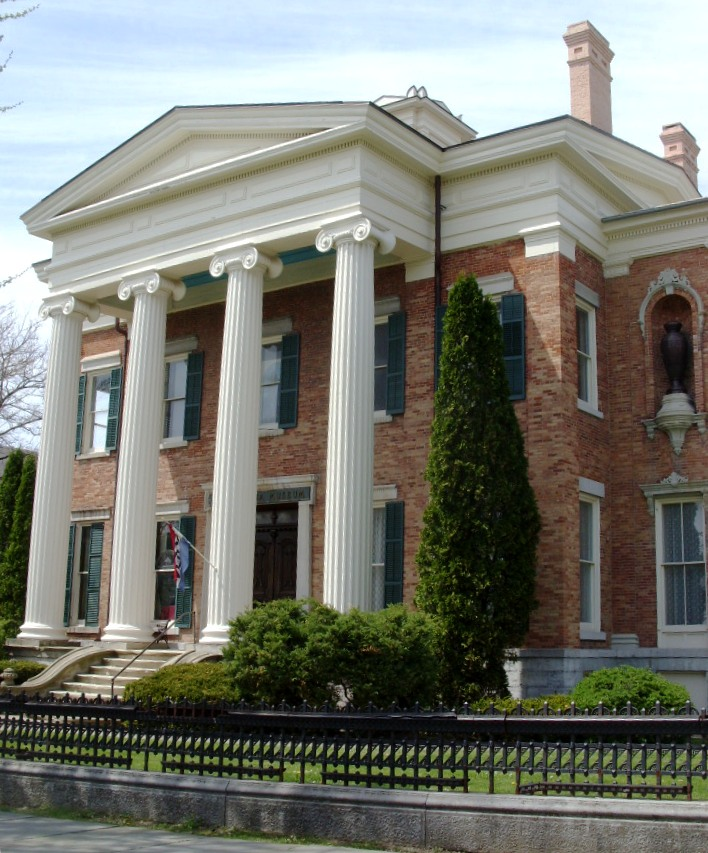
- Dr. Sylvester Willard Mansion

- Location within New York Location within the United States
- Location: 203 W. Genesee St., Auburn, New York
- Coordinates: 42°55′39″N 76°34′30″W
- Area: 1 acre (0.40 ha)
- Built: 1836
- Architectural style: Greek Revival, Neoclassical
- NRHP reference No.: 89001948
- Added to NRHP: November 13, 1989

Dr. Sylvester Willard Mansion, also known as the Willard-Case Mansion and the Cayuga Museum of History and Art, is a historic mansion and related outbuildings located in Auburn, Cayuga County, New York state.

== Architecture ==
The Willard-Case Mansion is a monumental Greek Revival style brick mansion, originally built in 1836-1843 by John Seymour. It had Classical Revival wings added in the late 19th century. It is a two-story, five-bay, center hall building, resting on a stone foundation.

The front facade features a monumental Greek Revival pedimented portico with massive fluted Ionic columns. A large dining wing and small palazzo-like wing was added to the main block in the 1870s-1880s. The interior features a rare example of a Tiffany Glass and Decorating Company domestic window added about 1894–1896.

The property also includes an ornate, late 19th century cast iron fence with stone pillars, and an elaborate wrought iron garden gate with cast iron embellishments.

== Cinema research ==
In 1916, the Willard Mansion was acquired by Theodore Case (1888–1944). He converted several outbuildings to pursue his cinema technology research projects: a former 19th century carriage house, converted into an experimental movie studio, and a former 19th century greenhouse, converted in 1916 to the Case Research Laboratory, to support his research into sound-on-film technology.

Ted Case was an American physicist and inventor known for the invention of the Movietone optical sound-on-film method for sound films ("talkies").

== Museum ==
The property now houses the Cayuga Museum of History and Art and Case Research Lab. It is a history museum with collections of fine art and local history, and a cinema museum presenting the work of the Case Research Laboratory.

The Dr. Sylvester Willard Mansion was listed on the National Register of Historic Places in 1989.

== Gallery ==
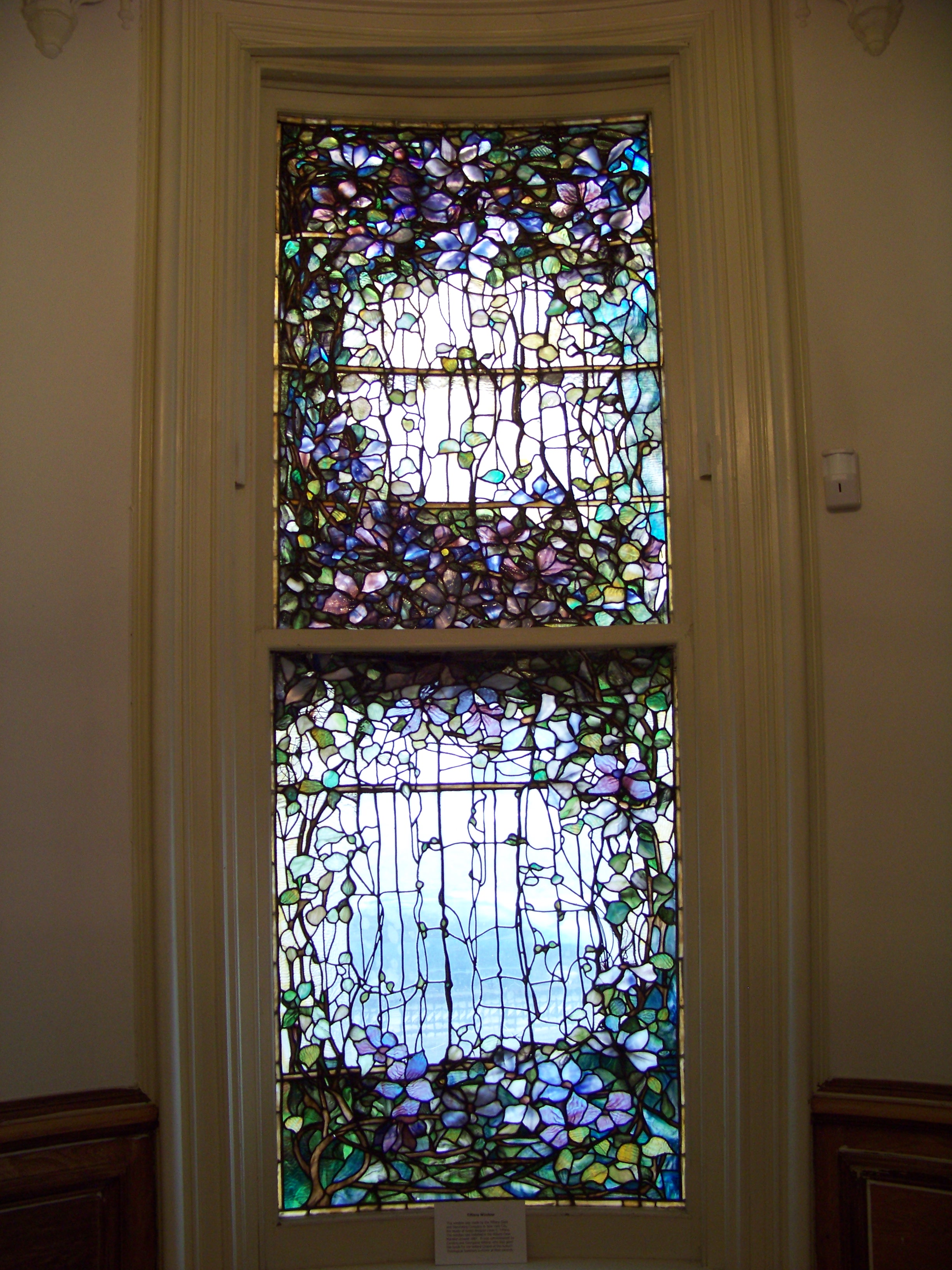
Tiffany window.

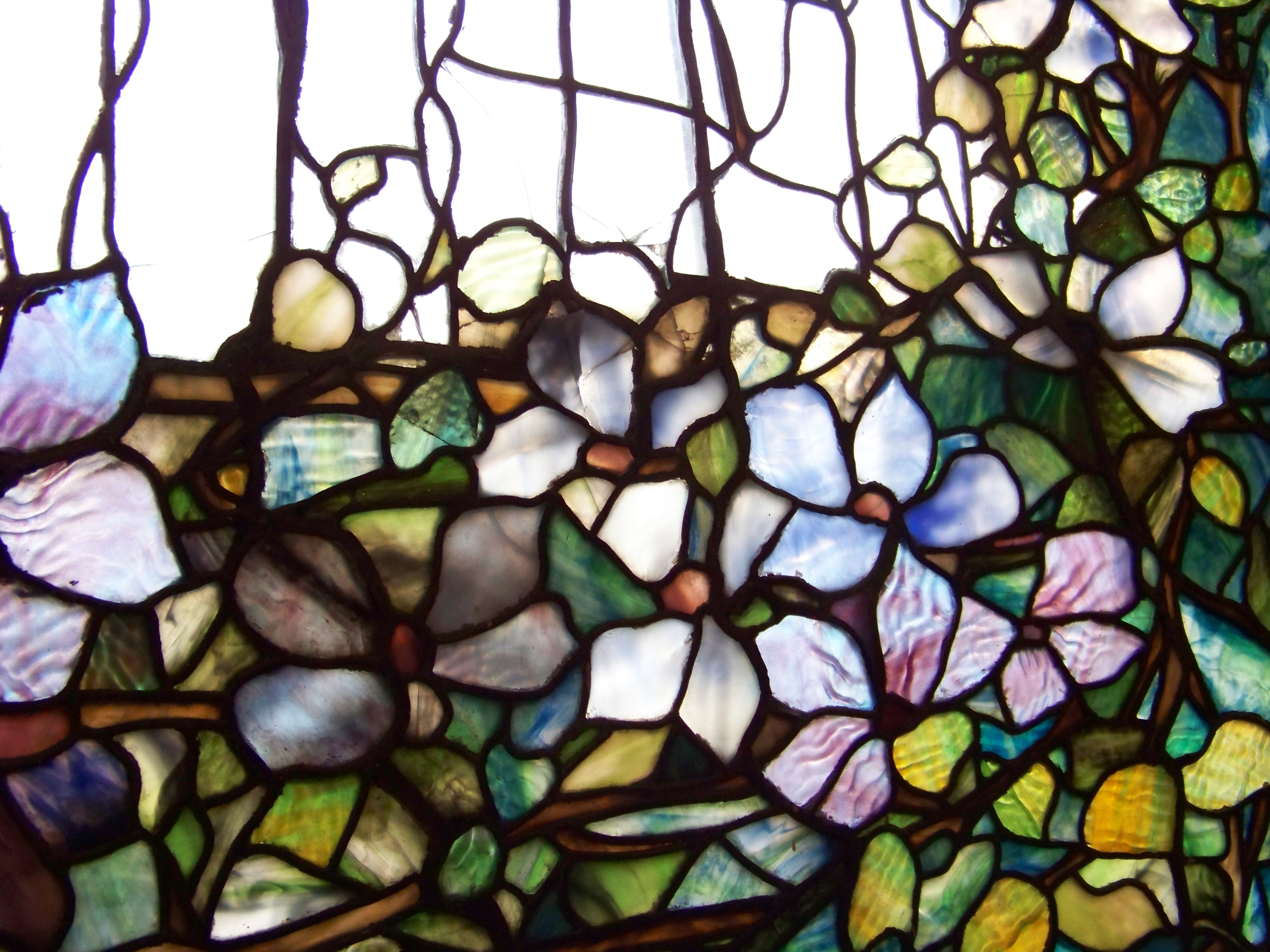
Tiffany window detail.

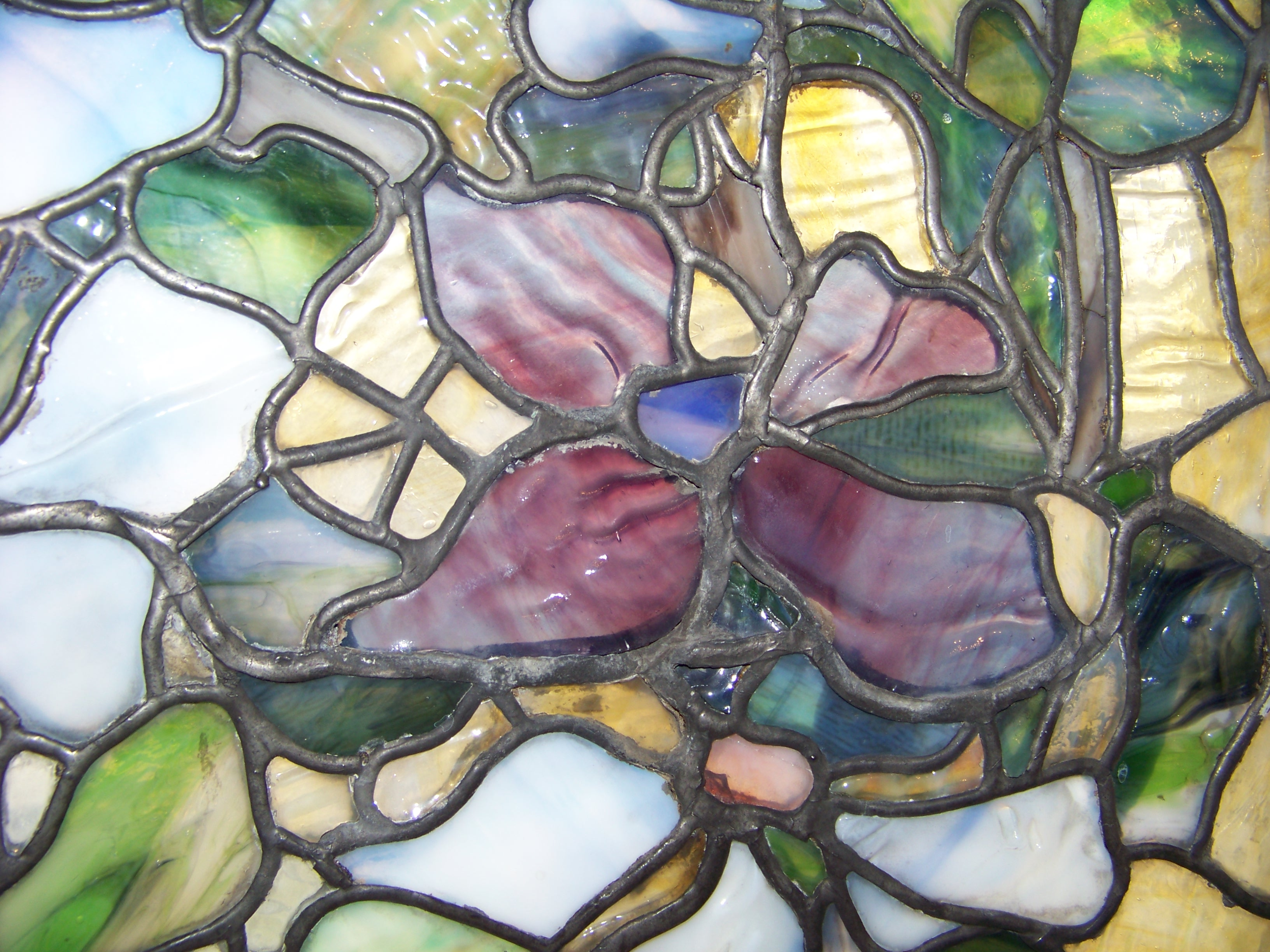
Tiffany window close-up detail.

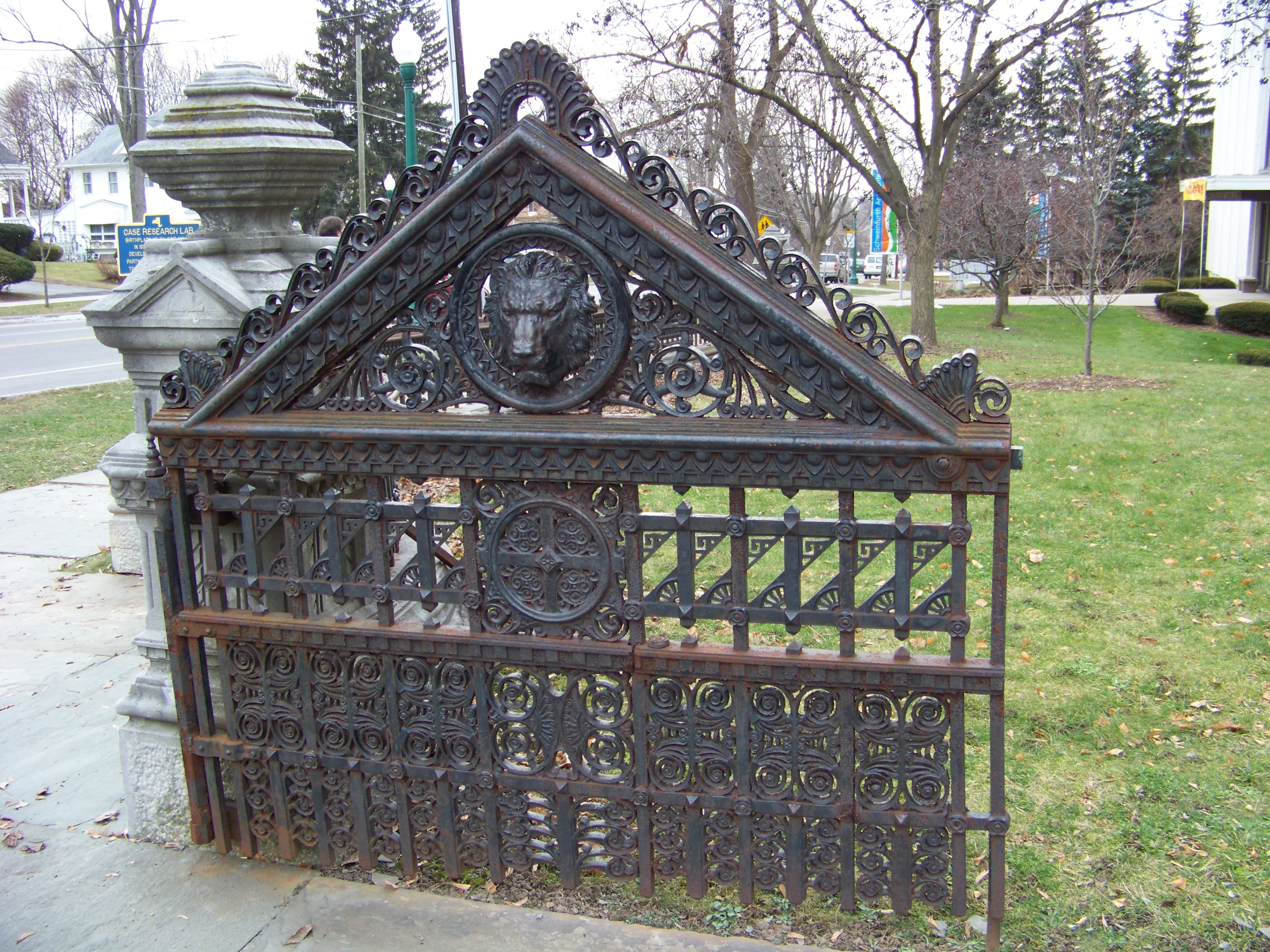
Elaborate cast and wrought iron garden gate.

== See also ==
- Willard Memorial Chapel-Welch Memorial Hall
- Theodore Case
- Theodore Case Sound Test: Gus Visser and His Singing Duck
- Movietone sound system
- National Register of Historic Places listings in Cayuga County, New York
