= Freeman Harrison Owens =

American filmmaker and aerial photographer

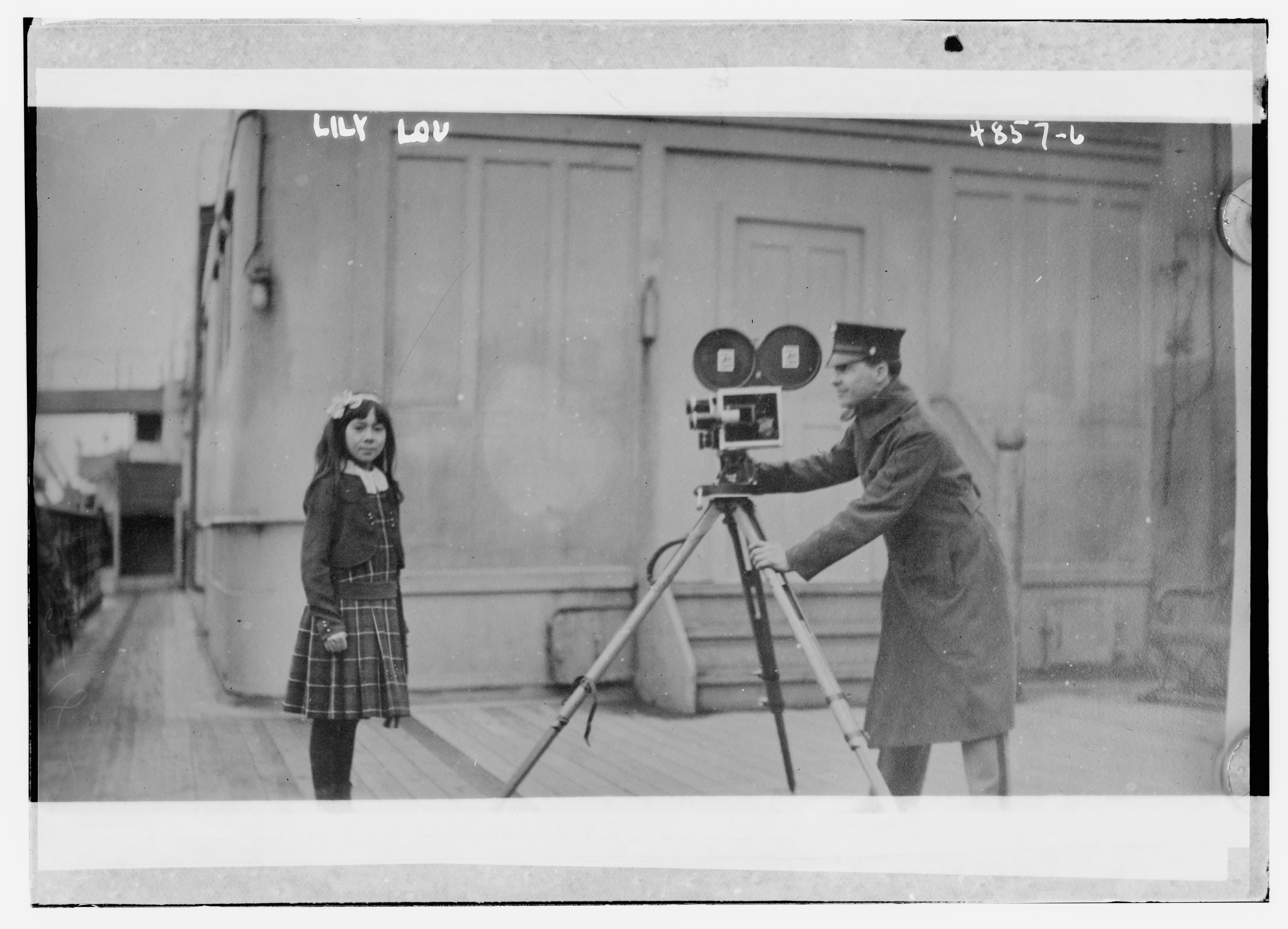
Freeman Harrison Owens in 1919

Freeman Harrison Owens (July 20, 1890 – December 9, 1979) was an early American filmmaker and aerial photographer.

== Biography ==
Owens was born in Pine Bluff, Arkansas, the only child of Charles H. Owens and Christabel Harrison. He attended Pine Bluff High School in Pine Bluff, but quit in his senior year to work at a local movie theatre as a projectionist.

Owens constructed his own 35mm movie camera at the age of 16. He filmed early newsreels, such as the Chicago Union Stock Yards Fire in December 1910 and the Charleston, South Carolina, hurricane and flood in August 1911. He served during World War I as a photographer, helping progress the art of aerial photography for combat purposes.

He filmed the famous Joe Stecher vs. Earl Caddock wrestling match at Madison Square Garden on January 30, 1920. His last credit as cinematographer was Love's Old Sweet Song (1923), filmed in the Lee DeForest Phonofilm process, and starring Donald Gallaher, Louis Wolheim, and Una Merkel.

In June 1923, DeForest began legal action against Owens alleging patent infringement. In 1924, Owens sold his patents for the Movietone sound-on-film process to Fox Film Corporation owner William Fox. In July 1926, Fox acquired the patents of Theodore Case (1888–1944) – and acquired the U.S. rights to the German Tri-Ergon patents – to create the Fox Movietone sound-on-film system.

Freeman Harrison Owens died on December 9, 1979, in Pine Bluff, at the age of 89, and is buried at Bellwood Cemetery in his hometown of Pine Bluff, Arkansas. He was inducted into the Arkansas Entertainers Hall of Fame in Pine Bluff on October 3, 2003, and was inducted into the Arkansas Walk of Fame in Hot Springs (Garland County) on December 6, 2003.
