= Theodore Case Sound Test: Gus Visser and His Singing Duck =

1925 film

Theodore Case Sound Test: Gus Visser and his Singing Duck
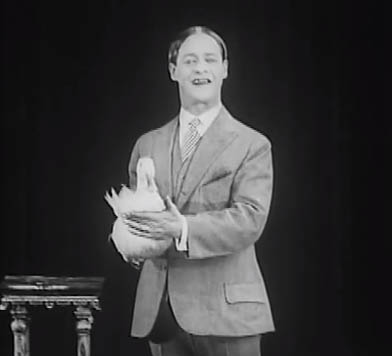
- Screenshot from the film
- Directed by: Theodore Case
- Starring: Gus Visser
- Release date: June 1925
- Running time: 2 minutes
- Country: United States
- Language: English

Theodore Case Sound Test: Gus Visser and his Singing Duck, also known as Gus Visser and His Singing Duck, is a 1925 American short musical comedy film starring vaudeville performer Gus Visser. The short is an early sound film, directed by Theodore Case while perfecting his variable density sound-on-film process. Case began working on his sound film process at the Case Research Lab in Auburn, New York, in 1921.

In 2002, the film was selected for preservation in the National Film Registry at the Library of Congress for being a historically important American film. An original print of the film is preserved at the George Eastman House.

== History ==
From 1921 to 1924, Case provided Lee De Forest with inventions of the Case Research Lab for use as improvements in De Forest's Phonofilm system, but had a falling-out with De Forest after failing to be credited for those inventions, such as the AEO Light, that made De Forest's system workable. From 1916 to 1927, Earl I. Sponable worked for Case. After Case sold his system in July 1926 to William Fox—who renamed the Case system Fox Movietone—Sponable went to work for Fox Movietone.

Other test films by Case in his process include Miss Manila Martin and Her Pet Squirrel (1921), Bird in a Cage (1923), Madame Fifi (1925), and Chinese Variety Performer with a Ukelele (1925) and Gallagher and Shean (1925), all recorded in a sparse studio located on the second floor of the Case estate carriage house in Auburn, New York, now a museum. Most of Case's test films were destroyed in a fire in a storage building in the 1950s, though a dozen or so have survived to this day. Some of those films are at the Library of Congress, George Eastman House, and the Case Research Lab Museum.

== Overview ==
The full film

The film depicts Visser singing the song "Ma, He's Making Eyes at Me" while holding a duck. The duck quacks each time the word "Ma" is said, sounding as if she is saying "Ma". The film was shot on May 12, 1925, in Case's sound studio at his home in Auburn, New York.

There are as many as three separate takes of Visser's act that exist. The film was shown in June 1925 at the Exposition of Progress in Auburn. Visser (b. January 21, 1894, Netherlands; d. September 1967, North Bergen, New Jersey) is listed as an entertainer in the Auburn City Directory in the early 1920s. However, his name disappears from the directory by the mid-1920s and there is as yet no further information known of Visser, nor of his duck.

== Equipment ==
The material and equipment used for shooting the video can be found at the Cayuga Museum of History and Art.

== See also ==
- List of films preserved in the United States National Film Registry
