= Movietone Records =

Movietone Records was a budget records subsidiary of 20th Century Fox's record division, which issued 29 albums starting in 1965 and ending in 1967. Most or all of these were reissues of albums that had appeared earlier on the 20th Century Fox label. Artists featured on these albums included Shirley Temple, Al Martino, Lena Horne, Art Tatum, Marilyn Monroe, and Sylvia Syms.

The name "Movietone" had been used by Fox Film Corporation since 1926, when it was coined by William Fox to name the process he had bought for putting sound on film for "talkies". By the time the 1965 incarnation of the record label came along, Fox had issued some 78s on the Fox Movietone label decades earlier, but these were not commercial issues, as far as is known. "Movietone" was also the name Fox gave to its TV and newsreel coverage.

== See also ==
- Fox Movietone News
