= Theodore Case =

American chemist and inventor (1888–1944)

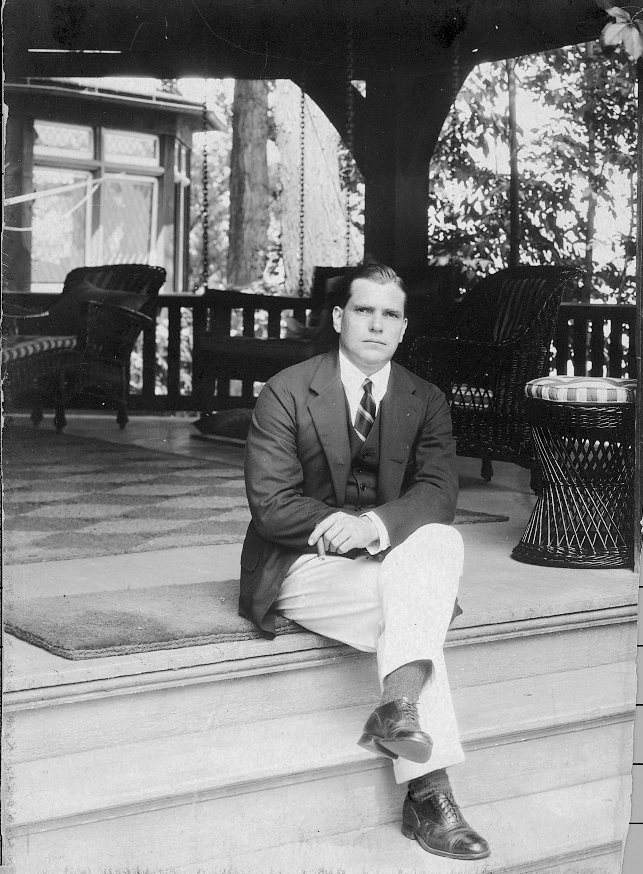
- Born: Theodore Willard Case; December 12, 1888; Auburn, New York, U.S.
- Died: May 13, 1944 (aged 55); Auburn, New York, U.S.
- Resting place: Fort Hill Cemetery
- Education: Yale University (BA); Harvard University
- Occupations: Chemist; inventor
- Years active: 1916–1941
- Spouse: Alice Gertrude Eldred (m. 1918)
- Children: 4

Theodore Willard Case (December 12, 1888 – May 13, 1944) was an American chemist who invented the Movietone sound-on-film system.

== Early life and education ==
Case was born on December 12, 1888 in Auburn, New York, to Willard Erastus Case (1857–1918) and Eva Fidelia Caldwell Case (1857–1952). He attended a few boarding schools as a youth including The Manlius School near Syracuse, New York and Cloyne House School in Newport, Rhode Island, He also attended the St. Paul School in Concord, New Hampshire, to finish his secondary education. Following his high school graduation he attended Yale University from 1908 to 1912, where he earned his BA in chemistry. He then attended Harvard University where he studied law. He did not find this as fulfilling as pursuing science so he left after about a year. During the years prior to opening the Case Research Lab he worked with his father in laboratories set up in the basements of their family homes, and their lake property on Owasco Lake. The mansion eventually became the home of Theodore W. Case was built by John Seymour in 1836. In 1843, Sylvester Willard and his father-in-law Erastus Case purchased the mansion. Willard Case inherited the property in 1916 when his cousin Caroline Willard passed away and left the property to him. Willard gave the property to Case. Willard Case, Theodore Case, and Earl I. Sponable worked together to open the Case Research Lab in the backyard of the mansion in 1916.

== Personal life and death ==
Theodore Case was of the well-known Case family in Auburn, New York. He enjoyed playing golf and won a number of tournaments in Auburn. On November 26, 1918, Case married Alice Gertrude Eldred. The couple would go on to have four children.

Case died on May 13, 1944, aged 55, of pneumonia. He is buried in Fort Hill Cemetery, in Auburn, New York.

== Career ==
=== Early years ===
While at Yale, Case became interested in telephonic currents that derived from modulating light. In 1916, he opened Case Research Lab in Auburn, where he studied materials that could be altered by light. His studies led to the development of the thalofide (thallium sulfide) cell, a light-sensitive vacuum tube from 1916 to 1918. The thalofide cell was originally used by the United States Navy in a top secret infrared signaling system developed at the Case Lab.

=== Work in sound-on-film ===
Case began working on his sound-on-film process in 1921. The inventions of the Case Research Lab from 1916 to 1926 were the creation of Case and Earl I. Sponable, who worked with Case at the lab until he went with Case to Fox Film Corporation in 1926. The ship-to-ship signaling system was first tested in 1917 off the shores of New Jersey. Attending the test was Thomas Edison, contracted by the Navy to evaluate new technologies. A complete success, the signaling system was used by the Navy for a number of years. He worked with other people, including Lee De Forest, to create a sound-on-film process similar to modern analog sound film systems.

Titles filmed by Case in his process, all made at the Case Studios in Auburn, New York, include Miss Manila Martin and Her Pet Squirrel (1921), Gus Visser and His Singing Duck (1925), Bird in a Cage (1923), Gallagher and Shean (1925), Madame Fifi (1925), and Chinese Variety Performer with a Ukulele (1925). Gus Visser and His Singing Duck was nominated to the National Film Registry in 2002.

There were hundreds more test films made at the Case Lab that were lost in a fire in the 1950s. The Case Research Lab has become a public museum. Adjacent to the lab is the estate's carriage house where sound-film tests were made on its second floor. That sound studio is also open to the public and its collections include a seven-foot square balsawood box, known as a "blimp," that housed the camera and operator during filming. The original amplifiers and many more items used in the development of sound film at the Case Research Lab are also on display, as well as an early Wall camera used by Movietone News.

=== Case and DeForest ===
From 1921 to 1924, Case provided Lee De Forest, inventor of the audion tube, many inventions from his lab that made DeForest's Phonofilm sound-on-film process workable, though DeForest had been granted general patents in 1919. To develop a light for exposing a soundtrack to film, the Case Lab converted an old silent-film projector into a recording device. With it, the AEO light was created, which was mass-produced for use in all Movietone News cameras from 1928 to 1939, and in recording sound in all Fox feature films from 1928-1931. Movietone News used a single-system to record the sound and image simultaneously in a camera, while feature film production moved to a system that recorded sound on a separate machine that was essentially a sound camera with the lenses and picture shutter missing. It was an optical tape recorder that used film rather than tape and was mechanically interlocked with the picture camera.

On April 15, 1923, DeForest presented eighteen short films made in the Phonofilm process at the Rivoli Theater in New York City. The printed program for this presentation gives credit to the "DeForest-Case Patents". However, shortly after DeForest filed a lawsuit in June 1923 against Freeman Harrison Owens, another inventor who had worked with DeForest on sound-on-film systems, Case and DeForest had a falling out.

The dispute between Case and DeForest was due to Case not being properly credited for his lab's contributions to Phonofilms. Case attended the April 1923 presentation of Phonofilm and was never mentioned during that presentation. By this time, DeForest had already been repeatedly warned by Case to present the truth of the inventions, to no avail. The films shown at the Phonofilm presentation used the Case Research Lab AEO Light for recording sound, were filmed with a camera designed by the Case Lab, and used the Case Lab's Thallofide Cell for reproducing the sound. In September 1925, Case stopped providing DeForest with his lab's inventions, effectively putting DeForest out of the sound film business, but not out of the "claiming to have invented sound film" business.

The Case Research Lab then set about to perfect the system of sound film they had provided DeForest, now that DeForest was no longer able to inhibit their development of this new technology. One of the first things Case did was to change the location of the sound head on a sound-film projector from being above the picture head (as had been the Phonofilm standard) to below the picture head. According to Sponable, there were three reasons for this change: to accommodate a large flywheel in the soundhead, to simplify the design of the printer (which printed the picture and soundtrack in two separate passes) and to prevent films made to the Phonofilm standard being played on Case equipment. Case chose a separation of 20 frames between the sound and the picture frame to which it relates, this standard was adopted by all subsequent sound-on-film systems.

=== Case, Elwell and John Logie Baird ===
In June 1924, renowned Scottish inventor and television pioneer John Logie Baird bought from Cyril Frank Elwell a thalofide cell, developed by Case. The thalofide cell was part of the important new technology of 'talking pictures', i.e. Phonofilm.

=== Movietone and William Fox ===
On July 23, 1926, William Fox of Fox Film Corporation bought Case's patents relating to the sound-on-film process and formed the Fox-Case Corporation. From 1926 to 1927, Case worked with Fox's technicians to develop the Fox Movietone process. Fox had also previously purchased the rights to the sound film patents of Freeman Owens, who had developed a sound movie camera as early as 1921 and coined the term "Movietone", and the U.S. rights to the German Tri-Ergon sound-on-film process.

== Legacy ==
After Case's death, his summer home, Casowasco, was sold to The Methodist Church by Case's widow, Gertrude, for $20,000. Gertrude added two stipulations to the sale: that the church keep the name 'Casowasco' as a tribute to the Case family history, and that the property be used to serve the high purposes of God. This closed the history in Cayuga County of one of its founding families. The property functions as a year-round retreat and conference center, as well as a Christian summer camp.

With the profits earned from his sale of the Case Research Lab's invention of sound film to William Fox, Case built a 60-room home in Auburn which was, and remains, the largest house in the city. The Case mansion on South Street had been used as a mental health facility. At the end of 2011, the Unity House residence program left the mansion, and in 2016, the First Presbyterian Church (owners of the property) restructured the facility into a retreat center.

The local library, the Case Memorial-Seymour Library, carries the family name and is housed in a building funded by Case. It was listed on the National Register of Historic Places in 1980. In 1936, Case donated the Genesee Street property to a local group, forming an art and history museum for Cayuga County; the Cayuga Museum of History and Art. When operations of the Case Research Lab ceased in 1941, the lab building and contents were donated to the Cayuga Museum. In the 1990s, the Case Research Lab was restored to its original condition, with an exhibit highlighting the work of Case and the Case Research Lab. The Cayuga Museum, also known as the Dr. Sylvester Willard Mansion, was listed on the National Register of Historic Places in 1989.

== See also ==
- Joseph Tykociński-Tykociner
- RCA Photophone
- Movietone sound system
- Phono-Kinema
- List of film formats
