= Joseph Tykociński-Tykociner =

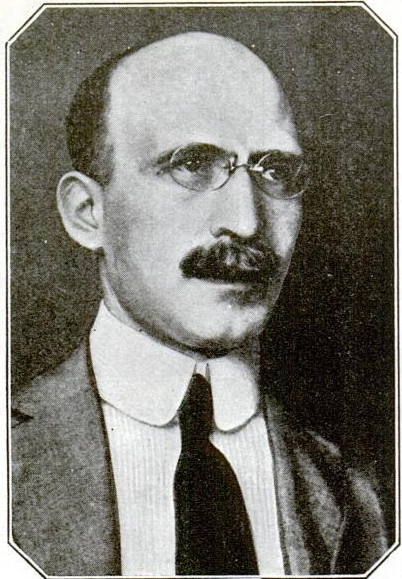
Photo published in 1922

Joseph Tykociński-Tykociner (also known as Joseph T. Tykociner; 5 October 1877, in Włocławek, Congress Poland – 11 June 1969, in Urbana, Illinois, United States) was a Polish engineer and a pioneer of sound-on-film technology.

In 1921 he became the first research professor of engineering at the University of Illinois at Urbana-Champaign. Within a year of his arrival at the university, he conducted the first sound-on-film motion picture recordings at a physics demonstration that showed how pictures and sound could be synchronized to produce a "talkie", a motion picture with sound.

== Life ==
Tykociner was born into a Jewish family in Włocławek, a town in Polish territory then under Russian control. He worked for the Marconi Company in 1901 in London at the time the first radio signal was transmitted across the Atlantic. At the age of eighteen he came to the United States. In New York City he met Nikola Tesla and became an expert in shortwave radio. He received a jeweled gold watch from Czar Nicholas II for setting up a radio communication system for the Russian fleet. He was at St. Petersburg's Helsinki Station when Lenin returned from exile in 1917. After the Russian Revolution of 1917 he worked on radio for the Polish government.

=== Sound film ===
He worked from 1918 to develop a system of recording and reproducing synchronized sound on motion picture film. He became the University of Illinois's first research professor of engineering in 1921. On June 9, 1922, Tykociner publicly demonstrated for the first time a motion picture with a soundtrack optically recorded directly onto the film. When Tykociner demonstrated the first sound-on-film motion picture recordings the projector had a photoelectric cell made by his Illinois colleague Jakob Kunz at its heart. In the first sounds ever publicly heard from a composite image-and-audio film, Helena Tykociner, the inventor's wife, spoke the words, "I will ring," and then rang a bell. Next, Ellery Paine, head of the university's Department of Electrical Engineering, recited the Gettysburg Address. The demonstration was written up in the New York World on July 30, 1922. A dispute between Tykociner and university president David Kinley over patent rights to the process thwarted its commercial application.

Tykociner applied for a patent shortly before the public demonstration. The patent was awarded in 1926. Many people consider Theodore Case as the inventor of the sound film even though Tykociński made sound film 3 years before him. In 1919, Lee De Forest filed patents for his sound-on-film process Phonofilm, unaware of Tykociner's work. DeForest, working with Theodore Case, produced several short films in 1921 and 1922, and introduced Phonofilm at a presentation at the Rivoli Theater in New York City on April 15, 1923. Case and DeForest had a falling out, and Case took his patents to William Fox, who used Case's patents to develop Fox Movietone.

=== Radar ===
In the 1920s, Tykociner did antenna design research that was a precursor to radar.

=== Zetetics ===
After his official retirement in 1946, he did research in a new field he termed "zetetics," (not to be confused with zeteticism, Marcello Truzzi's term for scientific skepticism), which Tykociński-Tykociner described as the collection and systematization of "all information about research activities, including creative processes, with the view of extending that knowledge which leads to discoveries, inventions, and the solution of human problems." This included the study of the science of research and the relationship between science and art. When he died in 1969 in Urbana, Illinois, his estate and papers were left to the university.

The Tykociner Memorial Lectures began in 1972 with a lecture by Dennis Gabor. Through 1998, other distinguished scientists and artists spoke on the relationship between science and the arts, including Leon Cooper, Leon Lederman, and Freeman Dyson. In 2002 the lectures were changed to weekly lectures in the Department of Electrical and Computer Engineering.

== See also ==
- List of multiple discoveries
- List of Poles
- Eric Tigerstedt
- Heinz von Foerster
- Charles A. Hoxie
- List of film sound systems
