= Thallium(I) sulfide =

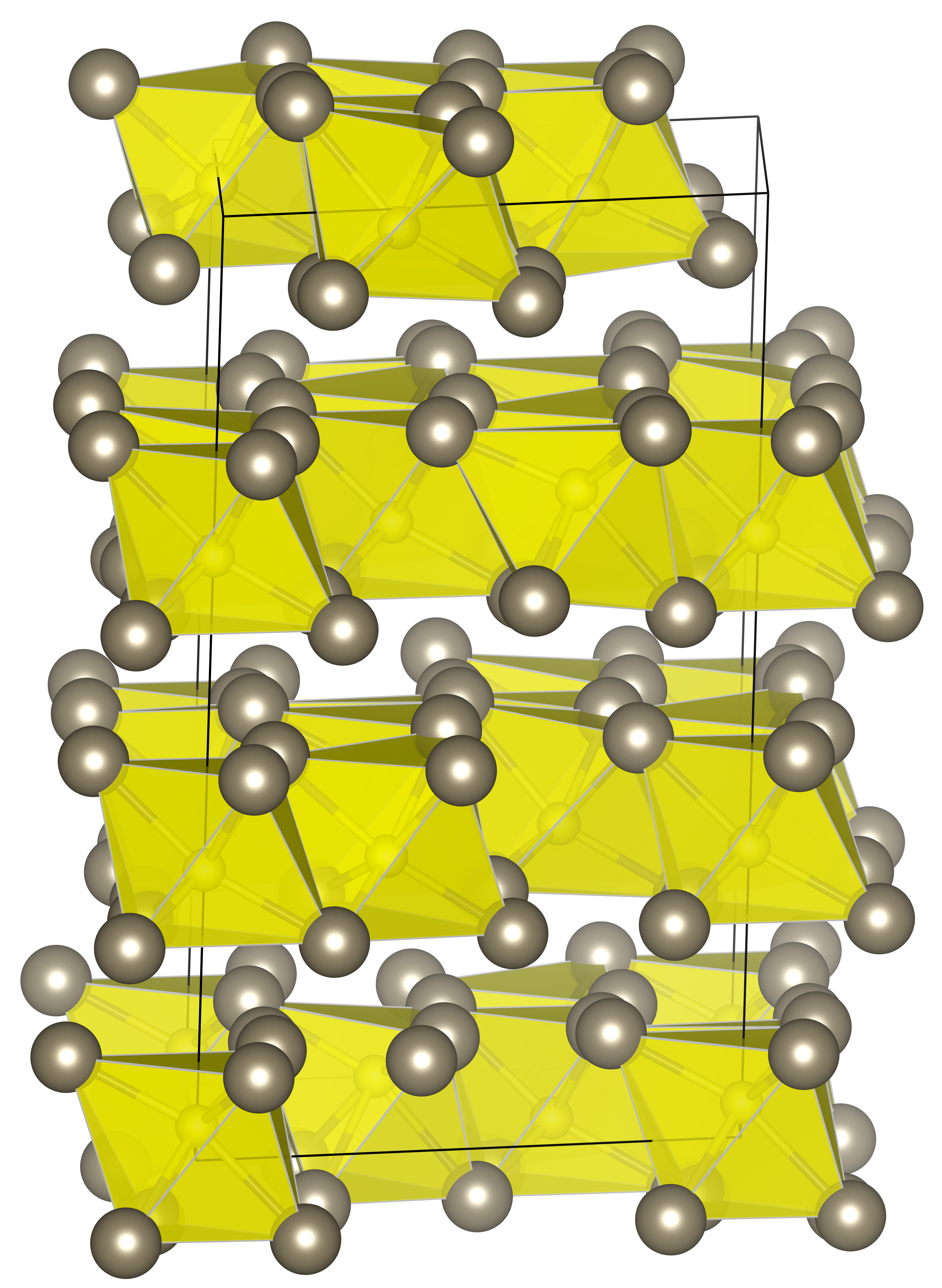
- Unit cell of thallium sulfide.

Names
- IUPAC name Thallium(I) sulfide
- Other names thallous sulfide, thallous sulphide

Identifiers
CAS Number	1314-97-2
3D model (JSmol)	Interactive image
ChemSpider	140161
ECHA InfoCard	100.013.865
EC Number	215-250-8
PubChem CID	16683485
UNII	W63QXT8PYG
CompTox Dashboard (EPA)	DTXSID801027166
- InChI: InChI=1S/S.2Tl/q-2;2*+1 Key: BXJGLLKRUQQYTC-UHFFFAOYSA-N
- SMILES: S([Tl])[Tl]

Properties
Chemical formula	Tl_{2}S
Molar mass	440.833 g/mol
Appearance	black crystalline solid
Density	8.390 g/cm^{3}
Melting point	448 °C (838 °F; 721 K)
Boiling point	1,367 °C (2,493 °F; 1,640 K)
Magnetic susceptibility (χ)	−88.8·10^{−6} cm^{3}/mol

Structure
Crystal structure	Trigonal, hR81
Space group	R3, No. 146
Lattice constant	a = 12.150(2) Å, c = 18.190(4) Å
Lattice volume (V)	2325.57 Å^{3}
Formula units (Z)	27
- Except where otherwise noted, data are given for materials in their standard state (at 25 °C [77 °F], 100 kPa). verify (what is ?) Infobox references

Thallium(I) sulfide, Tl_{2}S, is a chemical compound of thallium and sulfur.

== Occurrence ==
Tl_{2}S is found in nature as the mineral carlinite which has the distinction of being the only sulfide mineral of thallium that does not contain at least two metals. Tl_{2}S has a distorted anti-CdI_{2} structure.

== Synthesis ==
Tl_{2}S can be prepared from the elements or by precipitating the sulfide from a solution of thallium(I), e.g. the sulfate or nitrate. Thin films have been deposited, produced from a mixture of citratothallium complex and thiourea. Heating the film in nitrogen at 300°C converts all the product into Tl_{2}S

== History and applications ==
This salt was used in some of the earliest photo-electric detectors by Theodore Case who developed the so-called thalofide (sometimes spelt thallofide) cell, used in early film projectors. Case described the detector material as consisting of thallium, oxygen and sulfur, and this was incorrectly described by others as being thallium oxysulfide, which incidentally is a compound that is not known. Case's work was then built on by R.J. Cashman who recognised that the controlled oxidation of the Tl_{2}S film was key to the operation of the cell. Cashman's work culminated in the development of long wave infrared detectors used during the Second World War. Reliable Tl_{2}S detectors were also developed in Germany at the same time.
