= Movietone News =

Newsreel producer

Movietone News was a newsreel that ran from December 1927 to 1963 in the United States. Under the name British Movietone News, it also ran in the United Kingdom from 1929 to 1979, in France also produced by Fox-Europa, in Spain in the early 1930s as Noticiario Fox Movietone before being replaced by No-Do, in Australia and New Zealand until 1970, and Germany as Fox Tönende Wochenschau from 1930 to 1940 and from 1950 to 1978. An Indian version called Indian Movietone News ran in 1942 and 1943 before getting replaced by Indian News Parade.

== History ==
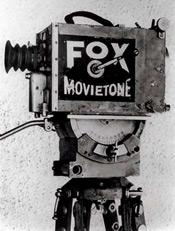
A vintage Fox movietone motion picture camera

Movietone News evolved from an earlier newsreel established by Fox Films called Fox News which was founded in 1919. It produced silent newsreels. When Fox entered talkies in 1928 with Mother Knows Best, the name Fox Movietone was applied to Fox's sound productions.

In the U.S. as Fox Movietone News it produced cinema sound newsreels from December 1927 to 1963, and from 1929 to 1986 in the UK (for much of that time as British Movietone News), as well as 1929 to 1975 in Australia. One of the earliest in the series featured George Bernard Shaw Talks to Movietone News, released on June 25, 1928.

One of the known early producers of these newsreels was Abraham Harrison also known as Harry, father of notable black and white photographer Dody Weston Thompson who also found a brief career in film making.

An early conductor of the Movietone News orchestra was Harry Lauder II, nephew of entertainer Sir Harry Lauder, who was contracted by the company for eighteen months before William Fox took him to his Hollywood studio. Sir Harry Lauder also appeared in test sound films made at the Fox Studios in New York City during the winter-spring of 1927.

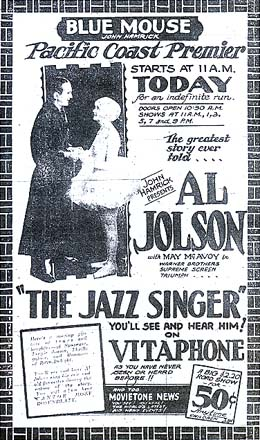
Newspaper ad from a fully equipped theater in Tacoma, Washington, showing The Jazz Singer, on Vitaphone, and a Fox newsreel, on Movietone, together on the same bill.

One installment, Fox Grandeur News, was released on May 26, 1929, in Fox's short-lived widescreen process Grandeur and shown before the feature film Fox Movietone Follies of 1929.

Hearst Metrotone News initially leased the Case Research Lab patents from William Fox for its sound newsreels. Each of these studios used this system of recording sound film for news items because it was an easily transported single-system of sound-on-film recording.

Fox's first use of recording a news event was on May 20, 1927: Charles Lindbergh's take-off from Roosevelt Field for his historic solo flight across the Atlantic Ocean was filmed with sound and shown in a New York theater that same night, inspiring Fox to create Movietone News. A regular narrator of the newsreels was broadcaster/journalist Lowell Thomas.

After Fox Films merged with 20th Century Pictures in 1935 to form 20th Century-Fox, the name of Fox Movietone News was shortened to Movietone News.

The company's last regular broadcast occurred in 1963, although it existed as a legal entity set to preserve important filmreels until Rupert Murdoch's acquisition of the parent company 20th Century Fox and the subsequent liquidation of Movietone in 1984 and 1986 respectively.

In Australia, Movietone and Cinesound were competitors for newsreel coverage, but later combined under the Australian Movie Magazine name.

== Status and licensing ==
The University of South Carolina Moving Image Research Collections has a portion of the Fox Movietone newsreel collection. The vast majority of the Fox Movietone Newsreel, is managed by Fox Film Corporation's corporate successor (and namesake), Fox News Channel. During its early years, Fox News Channel had a weekend show which played the newsreels. Licensing Fox Movietone is handled by Fox Archives

Licensing for Fox Movietone newsreels owned by the University of South Carolina is handled by the Moving Image Research Collections while licensing for Fox Movietone News is still owned by Fox Corporation and handled by Fox News Channel. British Movietone is owned separately by the films' successor-in-interest, operating under the name British Movietonews Ltd. The licensing of British Movietone newsreels is handled by AP Archive.

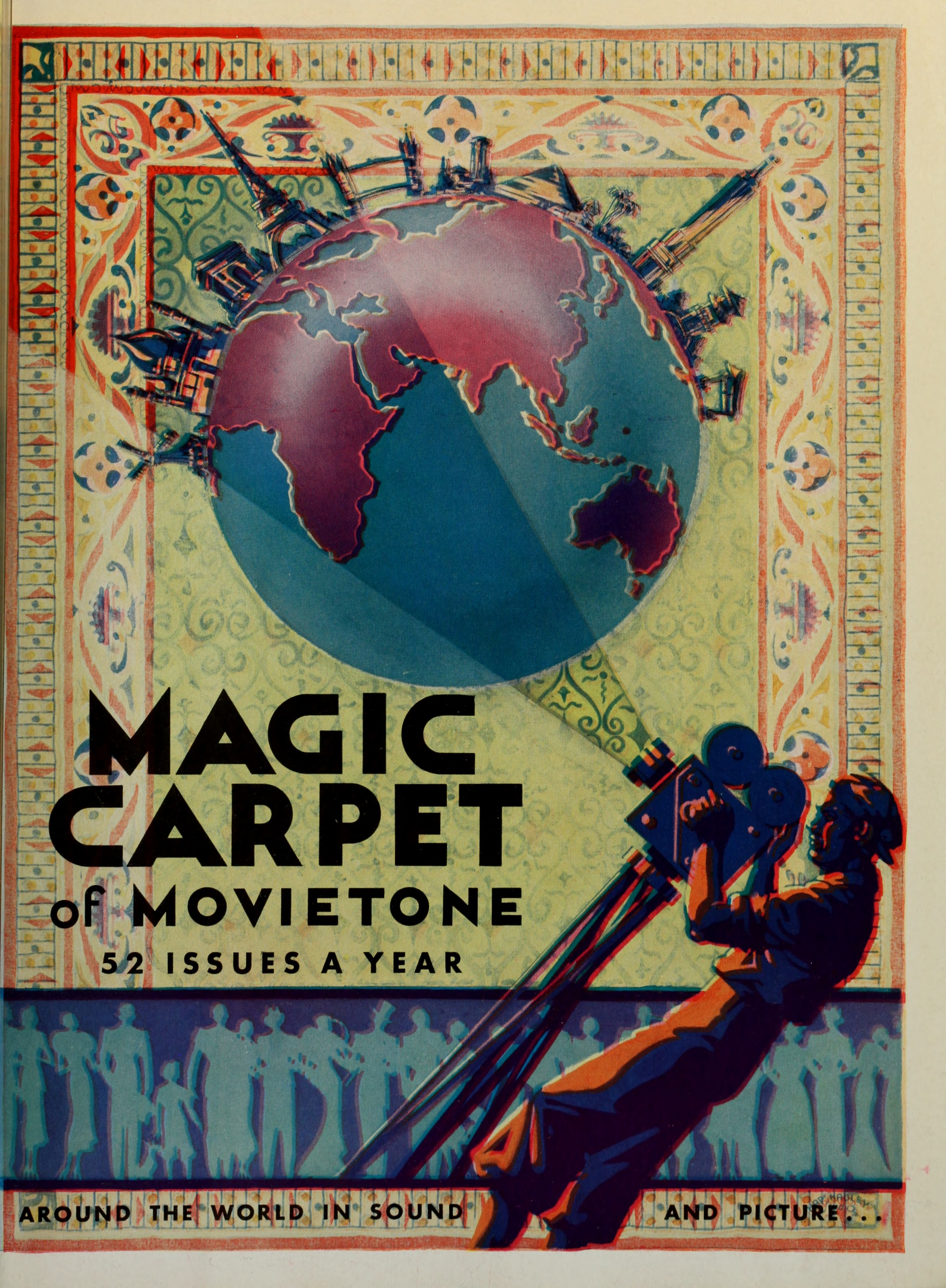
Magic Carpet of Movietone 52 issues a year, 1932 ad

In September 2016, it was announced that the British Movietone archive had been acquired by Associated Press.

The Movietone News Australia archive was donated to the National Film and Sound Archive in 1988.

== Archive ==
The Academy Film Archive houses the 20th Century Fox Movietone Shorts and Documentaries Series Collection.

In 2015, British Movietone and Associated Press's archival footage were released on YouTube.

== See also ==
- Newsreels
- List of online video archives
- Movietone sound system sound-on-film system introduced by Fox Film Corporation in 1927
- Movietone Records, the budget subsidiary of 20th Century Fox's record division
