= Photokinema =

Sound recording process for motion pictures

Photo-Kinema (some sources say Phono-Kinema) was a sound-on-disc system for motion pictures invented by Orlando Kellum.

== 1921 introduction ==
The system was first used for a small number of short films, mostly made in 1921. These films presented subjects such as actor Frederick Warde reading an original poem "A Sunset Reverie", labor leader Samuel Gompers speaking on labor issues, Judge Ben Lindsey on the need for a separate juvenile court system, Irvin S. Cobb reading from his works, and a lecture by James J. Davis, Secretary of Labor in the Harding administration.

Kellum also filmed musical numbers, including a performance of the song "De Ducks" by African American musicians F. E. Miller and Aubrey Lyles who wrote the book for the musical Shuffle Along (1921), and The Famous Van Eps Trio in a Bit of Jazz (1921), featuring Fred Van Eps, father of musician George Van Eps.

A filmed performance by Sir Harry Lauder made in Phono-Kinema is preserved at the UCLA Film and Television Archive but the disc with the sound is lost.

== D. W. Griffith and Dream Street ==
The process was most famously used by D. W. Griffith to record singing and sound effects sequences for his movie Dream Street (1921). Employing the Phonokinema system, Griffith turned what was originally a silent film into a sound film. Earlier crude sound-on-disc and sound-on-cylinder systems had been invented 1894–1914 by Thomas Edison (Kinetophone, Kinetophonograph), Cameraphone in the US, Gaumont (Chronomegaphone) and Pathé in France, and others, but they were only used for short films. Dream Street was the first feature-length film in which a frame-synchronous human voice was heard from a sound recording of any kind.

Some prints of Dream Street show Griffith speaking in a brief introduction to the film. However, the sound quality was poor, and Dream Street was only shown with sound at two theaters in New York City.

The silent version premiered on April 12, 1921 at the Central Theatre in New York City. On April 27, Griffith and Ralph Graves filmed and recorded their respective sound segments at Orlando Kellum's Photokinema office at 203 West 40th Street.

The premiere of the sound version of Dream Street took place on May 2, 1921 at Town Hall in New York City with Griffith's introduction. On May 15, the film also featured two other short sound sequences — Ralph Graves singing, and background noise in a scene showing a craps game. Unfortunately, no other theaters could show the sound version of the film, since no other theaters had the Photokinema sound system installed.

On Sunday, May 29, Dream Street moved to the Schubert-Crescent Theater in Brooklyn in a program with Phonokinema short films. However, business was poor and the program soon closed.

== Phonokinema overshadowed by other systems ==
Phonokinema was soon overshadowed by the Lee De Forest Phonofilm sound-on-film system which premiered in New York City on 15 April 1923. Phonofilm was itself overtaken by the Vitaphone sound-on-disc system, premiered in New York with Don Juan on 5 August 1926, and by other sound-on-film systems such as Fox Movietone in 1927 and RCA Photophone in 1928.

According to Internet Movie Database, two low-budget Westerns released in 1930, Sagebrush Politics and The Apache Kid's Escape, the latter film with Western star Jack Perrin, were the last two films released in the Phonokinema system.

In 1982, Kellum's widow donated the surviving films made with the Phonokinema process to the UCLA Film and Television Archive.

== See also ==
- Vitaphone
- Phonofilm
- Movietone
- RCA Photophone
- Kinetophone
- Kinetophonograph
- Sound film
- sound-on-film
- List of film formats
