= Sound-on-disc =

Early type of sound film installation

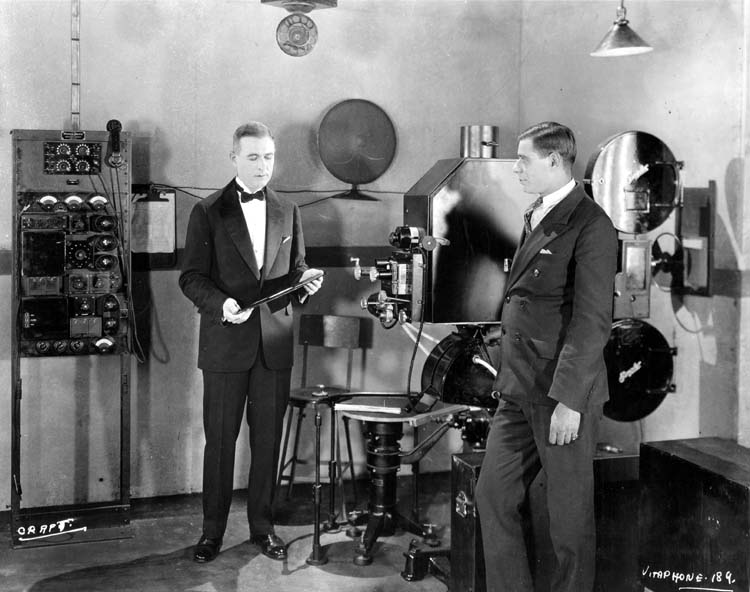
Western Electric engineer E. B. Craft (on the left) demonstrating Vitaphone sound-on-disc film system

Sound-on-disc is a class of sound film processes using a phonograph or other disc to record or play back sound in sync with a motion picture. Early sound-on-disc systems used a mechanical interlock with the movie projector, while more recent systems use timecodes.

== Examples of sound-on-disc processes ==
=== France ===
- The Chronophone (Léon Gaumont) "Filmparlants" and phonoscènes 1902–1910 (experimental), 1910–1917 (industrial)

=== United States ===
The Voice from the Screen (1926), a film demonstrating the Vitaphone sound-on-disc process

- Vitaphone introduced by Warner Bros. in 1926
- Photokinema, short-lived system, invented by Orlando Kellum in 1921 (used by D. W. Griffith for Dream Street)
- Digital Theater Systems

=== United Kingdom ===
- British Phototone, short-lived British system using 12-inch discs, introduced in 1928–29 (Clue of the New Pin)

=== Other ===
- Systems with the film projector linked to a phonograph or cylinder phonograph, developed by Thomas Edison (Kinetophone, Kinetophonograph), Selig Polyscope, French companies such as Gaumont (Chronomégaphone, Chronophone), and Pathé, and British systems.

== Film censorship ==
During the 1920s and early 1930s, films in the United States were subject to censorship by state and city censor boards, which often required cuts of scenes before a film would be licensed for exhibition. While films using the sound-on-film process could accommodate a patch for a requested cut with ease, a film using sound-on-disc would require an expensive retake. If the cost of compliance with a censor board was too high, the film would not be shown in that state or city.

== See also ==
- Sound film (includes history of sound film)
- Sound-on-film
- List of motion picture film formats
- List of early sound feature films (1926–1929)
