= Compressed air gramophone =

Amplified sound device

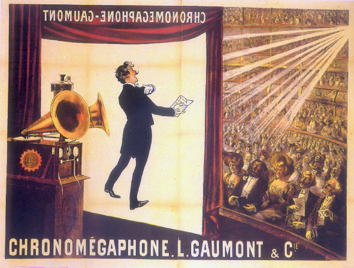
1908 poster advertising Gaumont's sound films, showing a Chronomégaphone

Compressed air gramophones were gramophones which employed compressed air and a pneumatic amplifier to amplify the recorded sound.

One of the earliest versions was the Auxetophone, designed by the Anglo-Irish engineer Sir Charles Parsons. It was capable of producing sufficient volume to broadcast public music performances from the top of the Blackpool Tower, and was said to be loud enough to cause people to vacate the front rows of seats in an auditorium. The Auxetophone was sold in the United States as the Victor Auxetophone.

== Pneumatic amplifier ==
A pneumatic amplifier was realised by using a sensitive valve, which required little force to operate, to modulate the flow of a stream of compressed air. The basic principle of the valves used in these devices was to pass the stream of compressed air through two partially overlapping combs. The sound vibrations to be amplified were applied to one of the combs, causing it to move laterally in relation to the other comb, varying the degree of overlap and so altering the flow of compressed air in sympathy with the sound vibrations.

The Chronomégaphone, designed for large halls, was a compressed air gramophone which employed compressed air to amplify the recorded sound. It was used by Gaumont for the presentation of some of their early sound films.

Other compressed-air gramophones included the Elgéphone.
