= Donald Gallaher =

American actor (1895–1961)

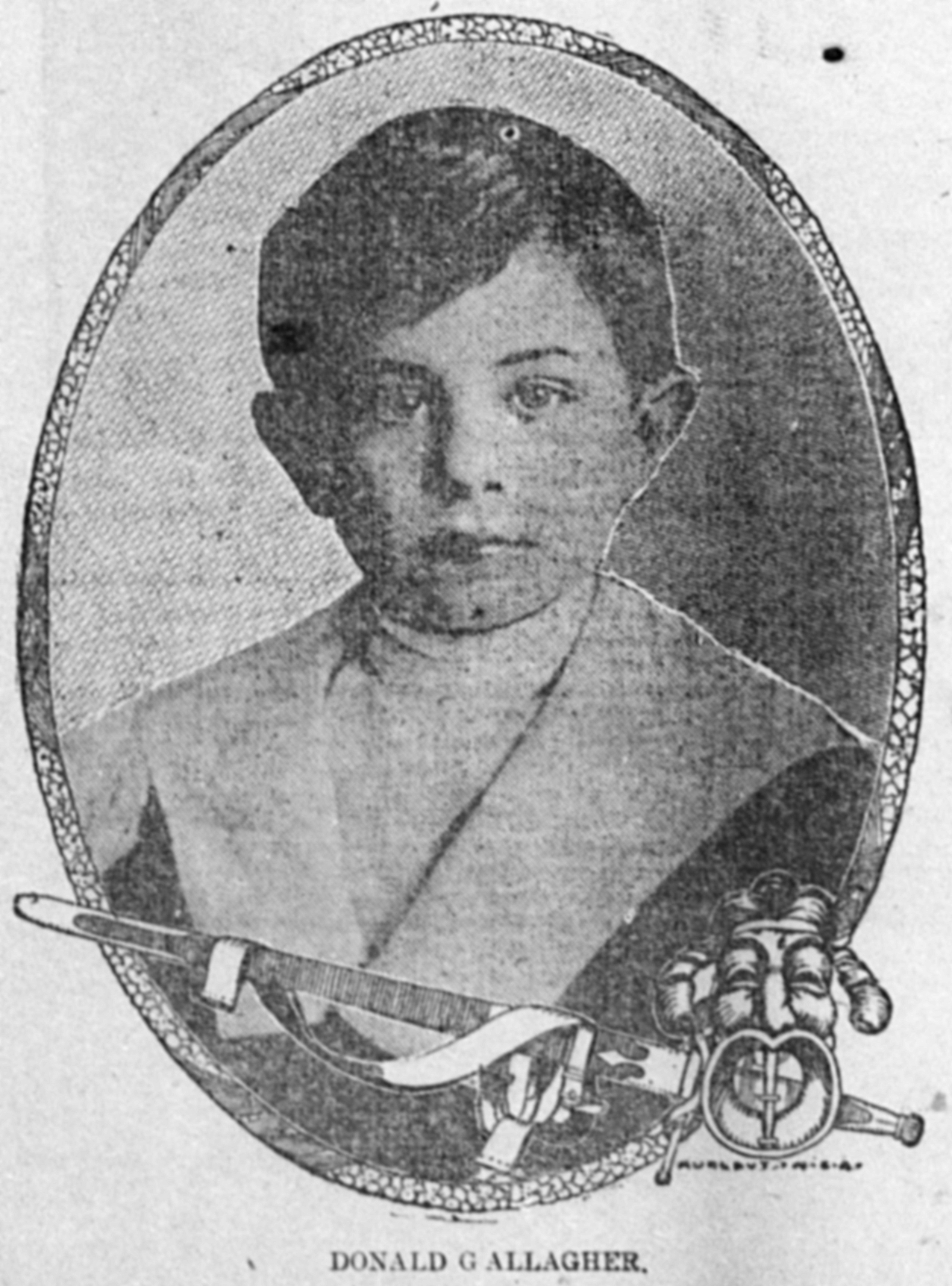
- Gallaher in 1904, when he was earning $100/week.
- Born: June 25, 1895; Quincy, Illinois, U.S.
- Died: August 14, 1961 (aged 66); Los Angeles, California, U.S.
- Occupation: Actor
- Years active: 1903–1939
- Spouses: Beatrice Noyes; Grace Martin Hannon (div. 1923) Adele Wormser (m. 1923)
- Children: 1

Donald Gallaher (June 25, 1895 – August 14, 1961) was an American actor who appeared in 25 films between 1903 and 1949. He also directed five films, including Temple Tower (1930). His name is sometimes misspelled "Gallagher".

== Early years ==
Gallaher was born in Quincy, Illinois. After moving to New York City as a child with his mother, he began acting in productions such as A Royal Family. He had 10 roles in plays before he reached age 12.

== Career ==
When he was four years old, Gallaher debuted as an actor portraying Rip in Sol Smith Russell's production of Poor Relations. When he was 15, he ceased acting for two years and pitched in semi-professional baseball on Long Island. He returned to the stage at age 17.

He appeared in the silent film The Great Train Robbery (1903), and a bit part in the 23-chapter serial The Million Dollar Mystery (1914). He co-starred with Louis Wolheim and Una Merkel in the two-reeler Love's Old Sweet Song (1923) filmed in Lee De Forest's Phonofilm sound-on-film process.

Later in life, he produced Broadway plays and directed films, including Temple Tower (1930), June First (1931), and The Hot Spot (1931).

In 1949, using the name Don Gallagher, he served as narrator of the ABC Television Players, a short-lived dramatic anthology series broadcast from Chicago.

== Personal life ==
On April 13, 1917, Gallaher married actress Beatrice Noyes. They had a son, Donald Gallaher Jr., and divorced on April 1, 1921. On December 1, 1923, Gallaher married Adele Wormser in Boston. The wedding came shortly after his divorce from Grace Martin Hannon became final.

== Selected filmography ==
- The Great Train Robbery (1903)
- Eye for Eye (1918)
- Love's Old Sweet Song (1923)
- Married in Hollywood (1929)
- Nix on Dames (1929) (director)
- Pleasure Crazed (1929)
- Temple Tower (1930) (director)
- Six-Gun Trail (1938)
- Outlaws' Paradise (1939)
- The Magnificent Fraud (1939)
- Code of the Fearless (1939)
