= Phonofilm =

Optical sound-on-film system

Left: variable density soundtrack. Right: variable area track soundtrack.

Phonofilm is an optical variable density sound-on-film system developed by inventors Lee de Forest and Theodore Case in the early 1920s.

In 1919 and 1920, de Forest, inventor of the audion tube, filed his first patents on a sound-on-film process, DeForest Phonofilm, which recorded sound directly onto film as parallel lines. These parallel lines photographically recorded electrical waveforms from a microphone, which were translated back into sound waves when the movie was projected.

The Phonofilm system, which recorded synchronized sound directly onto film, was used to record vaudeville acts, musical numbers, political speeches, and opera singers. The quality of Phonofilm was poor at first and while it improved somewhat in later years, it was never able to match the fidelity of sound-on-disc systems such as Vitaphone, or later sound-on-film systems such as RCA Photophone or Fox Movietone.

The films of de Forest were short films made primarily as demonstrations to try to interest major studios in Phonofilm. These films are particularly valuable to entertainment historians, as they include recordings of a wide variety of both well-known and less famous American vaudeville and British music hall acts which would otherwise have been forgotten.

== Development ==
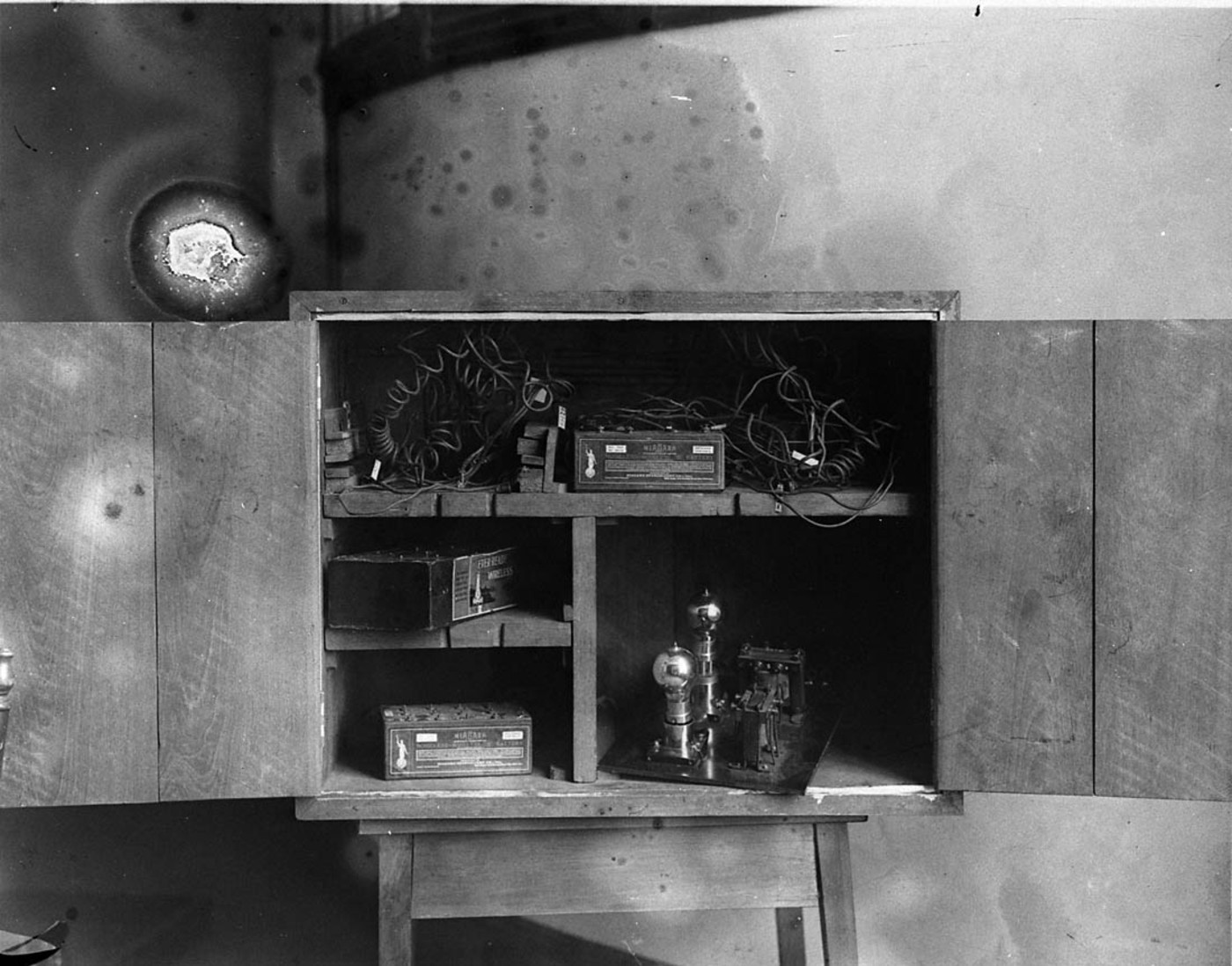
A piece of early sound equipment of the De Forest Phonofilms Corporation

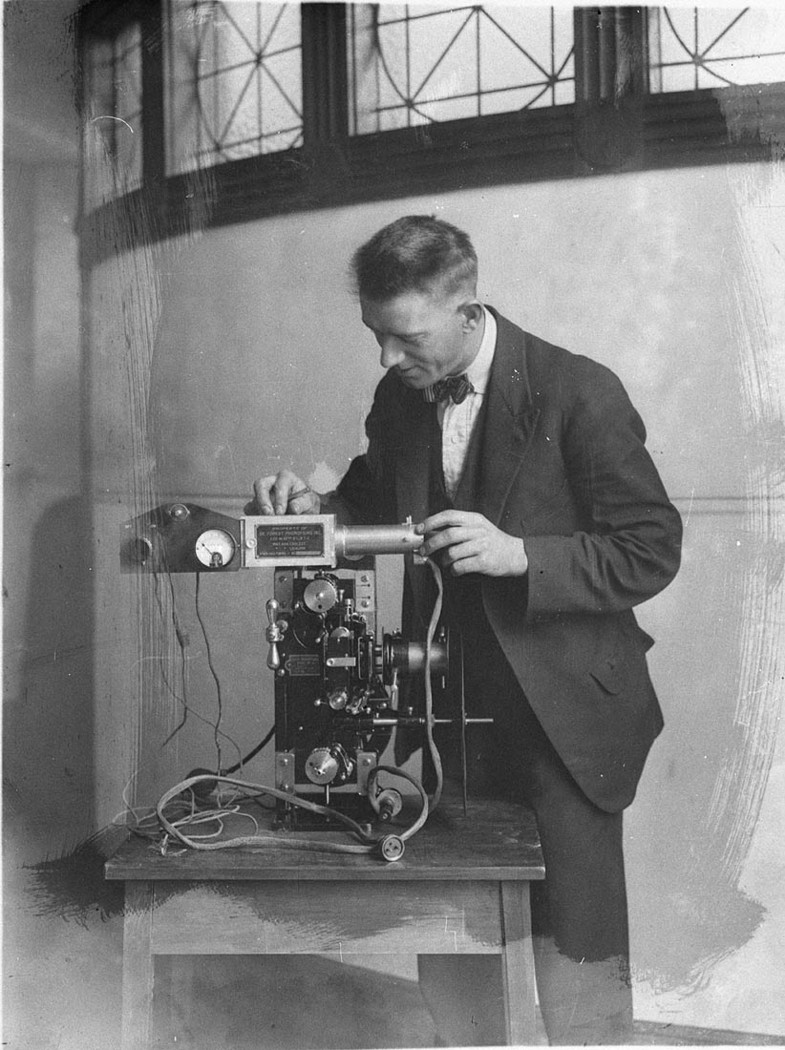
Charles Ward, sound engineer, fitting the sound-head to the projector of the De Forest Phonofilms' sound film system

In November 1922, de Forest founded the De Forest Phonofilm Corporation with studios at 314 East 48th Street in New York City, and offices at 220 West 42nd Street in the Candler Building. However, de Forest was unable to interest any of the major Hollywood movie studios in his invention.

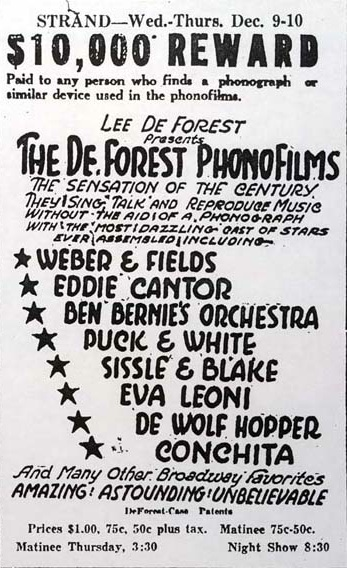
Newspaper ad for Phonofilm shorts shown at the Strand Theatre in Biloxi, Mississippi (Biloxi Daily Herald, December 5, 1925)

To record on film, de Forest tried using a standard incandescent bulb to expose amplified sound onto film. The bulbs quickly burned out, and, even while functioning, never produced a clear recording. To reproduce his nearly inaudible soundtracks, de Forest used a photocell that could not react quickly enough to the varying light coming to it as the soundtrack passed through the sound gate, resulting in an incomplete reproduction of sound from an inadequate recording – a dual failure.

Having failed to create a workable sound-on-film system by 1921, de Forest contacted Theodore Case to inquire about using a Case Research Lab invention, the Thallofide (thallium oxysulfide) Cell, for reproducing the recorded sound. Case provided de Forest with that major upgrade and later provided him with another Case Research Lab creation, the AEO Light, to use for recording the soundtrack.

== Debut ==
On March 12, 1923, de Forest presented a demonstration of Phonofilm to the press. On April 12, 1923, de Forest gave a private demonstration of the process to electrical engineers at the Engineering Society Building's Auditorium at 33 West 39th Street in New York City.

Phonofilm would at this point in time be distributed through Paramount Pictures, led by Adolph Zukor, and be billed as "Adolph Zukor presents Phonofilm."

On April 15, 1923, de Forest premiered 18 short films made in Phonofilm — including vaudeville acts, musical performers, opera, and ballet — at the Rivoli Theater at 1620 Broadway in New York City. The Rivoli's music director Hugo Riesenfeld co-hosted the presentation. The printed program gave credit to the "DeForest-Case Patents", but according to a letter Theodore Case wrote to de Forest immediately after the event, no credit was given to Case during the presentation itself.

De Forest later took his show on the road, pitching Phonofilm directly to the general public at a series of special engagements across the country. The shorts shown at one such demonstration in 1925, were as follows:

- (Overture)
- What the Phonofilm Means (Bart Doyle [?])
- A Study in Contrasts (comparing sound and silent film segments)
- From Far Seville (Concha Piquer)
- Old Melodies (Charles Ross Taggart)
- The Harlequin's Serenade [no other identification, adaptation of Harlequinade by Riccardo Drigo (d. 1930)]
- Stringed Harmony (Roy Smeck)
- Parade of the Wooden Soldiers [Franco-Russian ballet troupe Le Chauve Souris]
- A Few Moments With Eddie Cantor, Star of "Kid Boots"
- A Musical Monologue (with Phil Baker)
- President Calvin Coolidge Taken on the White House Lawn (August 11, 1924)
- (Intermission—Five Minutes)
- Ben Bernie's Orchestra ("Ben Bernie and All the Lads")
- Rigoletto, Act Two (Eva Leoni [1895-1972] and Company)
- The Bubble Dance (Lillian Powell)
- Weber and Fields (their famous poolhall skit)
- A Boston Star (Borrah Minevitch)
- DeWolfe [sic] Hopper (reciting "Casey at the Bat")
- Negro Folk Songs (Noble Sissle and Eubie Blake)
- Opera Versus Jazz (Eva Puck and Sammy White)
- (Exit March)

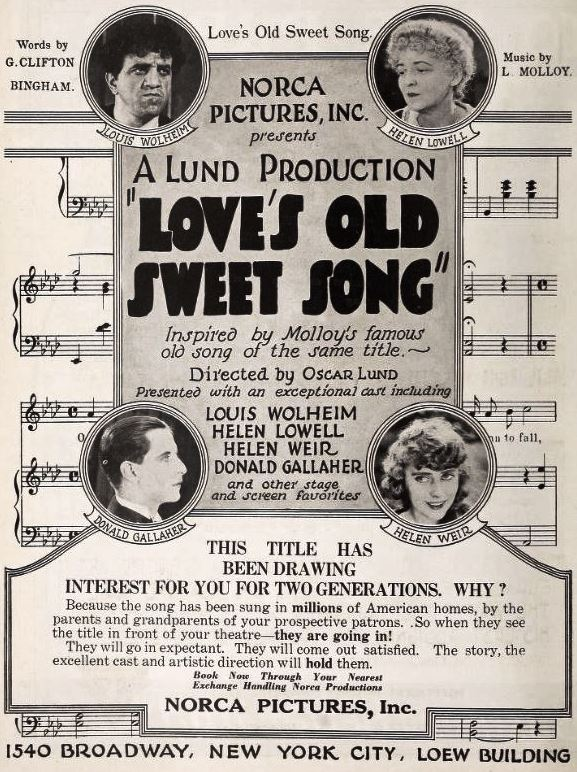
Advertisement for the American film Love's Old Sweet Song (1923) with Louis Wolheim, Helen Lowell, Donald Gallaher, and Helen Weir

De Forest was forced to show these films in independent theaters such as the Rivoli since Hollywood movie studios controlled all major U.S. movie theater chains at the time. De Forest's decision to film primarily short films (one reel), not feature films limited the appeal of his process. De Forest kept to one-reel films because he was unable to solve the problem of reel changes, and the disruption in sound which would occur, when a projectionist in a movie theater changed reels. One of the few two-reel films made in the Phonofilm process was Love's Old Sweet Song (1923), starring Louis Wolheim, Donald Gallaher, and the 20-year-old Una Merkel.

All or part of the Paramount Pictures features Bella Donna (premiered April 1, 1923) and The Covered Wagon (premiered March 16, 1923) were filmed with Phonofilm as an experiment. In the case of The Covered Wagon, Hugo Riesenfeld composed the music for the film. However, the Phonofilm versions were only shown at the premiere engagements, also at the Rivoli. "Siegfried", the first part of the Fritz Lang film Die Nibelungen (1924) had a Phonofilm soundtrack, but only at the New York City premiere at the Century Theatre on August 23, 1925.

Max Fleischer and Dave Fleischer used the Phonofilm process for their Song Car-Tunes series of cartoons which introduced the "Follow the Bouncing Ball" gimmick starting in May 1924. Of the 36 titles in the Song Car-Tunes series, 19 used Phonofilm. Also in 1924, the Fleischer brothers partnered with de Forest, Edwin Miles Fadiman, and Hugo Riesenfeld to form Red Seal Pictures Corporation, which owned 36 theaters on the East Coast, extending as far west as Cleveland, Ohio.

== Hollywood chooses other sound systems ==
Hollywood studios largely rejected Phonofilm, and instead introduced different systems for sound film.

In 1924, Western Electric was developing both a sound-on-disc system, where the film is synchronized with a phonograph containing the sound, and their own optical sound systems. They had settled on 24 frames per second (90 feet per minute) as the standard film speed for sound, as they found slower film speeds could not consistently reproduce sound well.

Warner Bros. was the first to use a sound-on-disc system, Vitaphone. Warner Bros. released the feature film Don Juan starring John Barrymore on August 5, 1926, in Vitaphone, with music and sound effects only. On October 6, 1927, Warner Bros. released The Jazz Singer with Al Jolson in Vitaphone. The Jazz Singer was the first feature film to use synchronized sound for talking sequences rather than just for music and sound effects, and thus launched the talkie era.

The Fox Movietone system was first demonstrated to the public at the Sam H. Harris Theatre in New York City on January 21, 1927, with a short film of Raquel Meller preceding the feature film What Price Glory?, originally released in November 1926. Later in 1927, Fox released the first sound-on-film feature Sunrise by F. W. Murnau. In 1928, the sound-on-film process RCA Photophone was adopted by newly created studio RKO Radio Pictures and by Paramount Pictures.

Since Western Electric's ERPI division dominated the theater hardware market when the sound revolution finally got underway, its standard 24-frames-per-second speed was universally adopted by Fox and all the other studios as each began making sound films. As a consequence, Case's tests and de Forest's early Phonofilms, shot at about 21 frames per second, gave speakers and singers high-pitched "helium voices" if they are run on a standard sound projector. The Library of Congress and other film archives have printed new copies of some early Phonofilms, modifying them by periodically duplicating frames and correspondingly "stretching" the soundtracks to make them compatible with standard projectors and telecine equipment.

== Downfall ==
Case and de Forest had a falling out due to de Forest taking full credit for the work of Case and Earl I. Sponable at the Case Research Lab. The Case Research Lab proceeded to build its own camera. That camera was used by Case and Sponable to film President Coolidge on August 11, 1924, creating one of the films shown by de Forest and claimed by him to be the product of "his" inventions. Case also expressed his displeasure that the program credited only the "DeForest-Case Patents", as Phonofilm's success rested upon the work of Case and his Case Research Lab.

Seeing that de Forest was more concerned with his own fame and recognition than he was with actually creating a workable system of sound film, and because of de Forest's continuing attempts to downplay the contributions of the Case Research Lab in the creation of Phonofilm, Case severed his ties with de Forest in the fall of 1925. On July 23, 1926, William Fox of Fox Film Corporation bought Case's patents, cutting off de Forest's access to them.

Without access to Case's inventions, de Forest was left with an incomplete system of sound film. He gave up on trying to exploit the process — at least in the U.S. (see UK section below). de Forest was in financial difficulty due to his lawsuits against Case, and had resorted to selling cut-rate sound equipment to second-run movie theaters wanting to convert to sound on the cheap. His company declared bankruptcy in September 1926. The Fleischers stopped releasing the Song Car-Tune films in Phonofilm shortly thereafter.

Even so, in June 1927, producer Pat Powers made an unsuccessful takeover bid for de Forest's company. In the aftermath, Powers hired former DeForest technician William Garity to produce a cloned version of the Phonofilm system which became Powers Cinephone.

== Phonofilm in the UK ==
In July 1925, The Gentleman, a comedy short film excerpt of The 9 to 11 Revue directed by William J. Elliott, was made using Phonofilm, the first sound-on-film production in England. In 1926, the owner of a UK cinema chain, M. B. Schlesinger, acquired the UK rights to Phonofilm. Schlesinger filmed short films of British music hall performers such as Marie Lloyd Jr. and Billy Merson, along with famous stage actors such as Sybil Thorndike and Bransby Williams performing excerpts of works by Shakespeare, Shaw, and Dickens, from September 1926 to May 1929.

On October 4, 1926, Phonofilm made its UK premiere with a program of short films presented at the Empire Cinema in London, including a short film with Sidney Bernstein welcoming Phonofilm to the UK. According to the British Film Institute website, the UK division of De Forest Phonofilm was taken over in August 1928 by British Talking Pictures and its subsidiary, British Sound Film Productions, which was formed in September 1928; it is believed British Talking Pictures acquired De Forest's primary assets, including patents and designs for theatre audio equipment.

In March 1929, a feature film The Clue of the New Pin, a part-talkie based on an Edgar Wallace novel, was trade-shown with The Crimson Circle, a German-UK coproduction which was also based on a Wallace novel. Crimson was filmed in Phonofilm, and Pin was made in British Phototone, a sound-on-disc process using 12-inch phonograph records synchronized with the film. However, the UK divisions of both Phonofilm and British Phototone soon closed.

The last films made in the UK in Phonofilm were released in early 1929, due to competition from Vitaphone, and sound-on-film systems such as Fox Movietone and RCA Photophone. The release in June 1929 of the sound version of Alfred Hitchcock's feature film Blackmail, made in RCA Photophone as adopted by its production company British International Pictures, sealed the fate of Phonofilm in the UK.

== Phonofilm in Australia ==
In June 1925, Phonofilm opened its first Australian office at 129 Bathurst Street, Sydney. On July 6, 1925, the first program of Phonofilms in Australia was shown at the Piccadilly Theatre in Sydney. A program was also shown at the Prince Edward Theatre in November and December 1925.

On April 6, 1927, Minister for Trade Herbert Pratten appeared in a DeForest film to celebrate the opening of a Phonofilm studio in Rushcutters Bay in Sydney. On May 12, 1927, a Phonofilm of the Duke and Dutchess of York arriving at Farm Cove was shown at the Lyceum Theatre in Sydney.

Phonofilm had closed all of its operations in Australia by October 1927, and sold its remaining studio facilities to an Australian company in October 1928.

== Phonofilm in Spain ==
In 1928, Spanish producer Feliciano Manuel Vitores bought the Spanish rights to Phonofilm from DeForest and dubbed it "Fonofilm". He produced four films in the process, Cuando fui león (1928), En confesionario (1928), Va usted en punto con el banco (1928), and El misterio de la Puerta del Sol (1929). The first three were short films directed by Manuel Marín starring Spanish comedian Ramper, and the last was the first sound feature film made in Spain. The feature film was released in Spain by Divina Home Video in 2005, after years of being thought a lost film.

== Phonofilm in Latin America ==
The Maurice Zouary collection at the Library of Congress holds approximately 45 films made in Phonofilm. A DVD produced by Zouary about the history of Phonofilm says that a short film of opera singers performing the Sextet from Lucia di Lammermoor was made by the "Latin American division" of Phonofilm. No further information is known about this division of Phonofilm. In 1926, DeForest released a short film referred to as Cuban Sound Documentary which included the Cuban national anthem and excerpts from The Merry Widow. However, little else is known of this film or whether other Phonofilms were made in Cuba.

== Legacy of Phonofilm ==
More than 200 short films were made in the Phonofilm process, with many preserved in the collections of the Library of Congress (45 titles) and the British Film Institute (98 titles). In 1976, five Phonofilm titles were discovered in a trunk in Australia, and these films have been restored by Australia's National Film and Sound Archive.

== List of films produced in Phonofilm ==
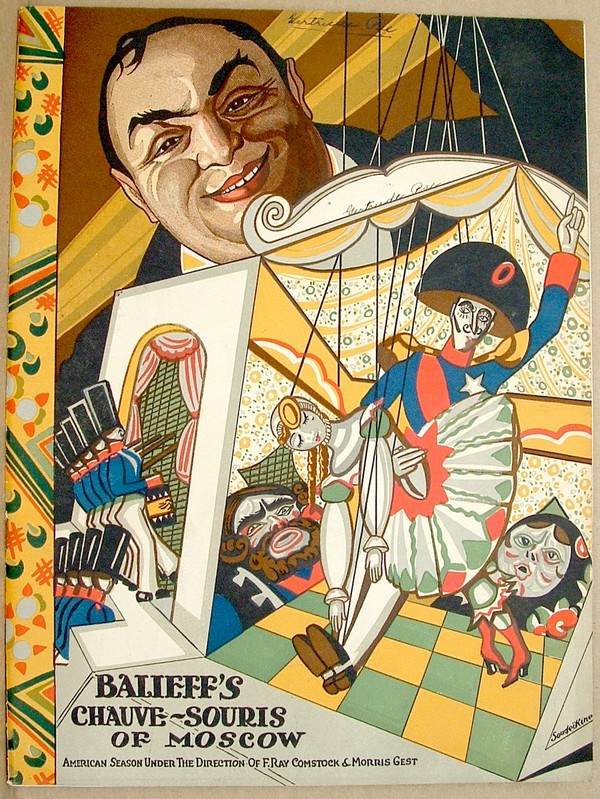
1922 U.S. La Chauve-Souris program cover, with the famous "Wooden Soldiers" marching (left)

1922 U.S. sheet music

1. A. C. Astor with Sentimental Mac (1928) ventriloquist Astor (d. April 7, 1966) with his dummy Sentimental Mac
2. Acci-Dental Treatment (1929) directed by Thomas Bentley with Ernie Lotinga as Jimmy Josser
3. The Actors' Squad (1927) short with Lawrence Anderson
4. Abraham Lincoln (1924) portrayal of Lincoln by actor Frank McGlynn Sr. in excerpt of 1918 play by John Drinkwater
5. Adolph Zukor Introduces Phonofilm (1923) for release of The Covered Wagon and Bella Donna, two Paramount Pictures feature films with soundtracks filmed in Phonofilm
6. Ag and Bert (1929) with Mabel Constanduros and Michael Hogan, directed by Bertram Phillips
7. Ain't She Sweet (1928) with Chili Bouchier and Dick Henderson; see also Mark Griver and Pilbeam and His Band entries (below)
8. Al Herman (1926) comedian Herman (1887–1967) performing a comedy sketch
9. Alexander's Ragtime Band (1926) Fleischer cartoon**
10. Alma Barnes the Internationally Famous Mimic (1926)
11. Almost a Gentleman (1928) comedy short with Billy Bennett
12. Alvin and Kelvin Keech (1926) brothers who are credited with the invention of the banjolele (banjo and ukulele)
13. America's Flyers (1927) filmed at Roosevelt Field (June 29, 1927) with Richard E. Byrd, George Noville, and Bert Acosta, with speech given by Grover Whalen (listed in BFI database)
14. Anna Pavlova Swan Dance (1925)
15. Annie Laurie (1926)**
16. The Antidote (1927) dramatic short directed by Thomas Bentley, with Primrose Morgan, Walter Sondes, and Jameson Thomas***
17. Armistice Day of 1928 (1928) produced by Phonofilms (Singapore) and released by British Sound Film Corporation
18. Arthur Roberts Sings "Topsey-Turvey" (April 1927) musical short with Arthur Roberts singing "Topsey-Turvey", directed by Bertram Phillips
19. As We Lie (1927) comedy short with Lillian Hall-Davis and Miles Mander, directed by Mander; also known as Lost One Wife
20. Ashton and Rawson (May 1928) Doris Ashton and Billy Rawson; Ashton sings and Rawson plays piano (BFI Database)
21. At the Photographer's (1929) comedy short released by Ellbee Pictures
22. An Attempted Duet (1928) comedy short with Beryl Beresford and Leslie Hinton
23. Barber and Jackson in The Long and the Short of It (1922) with Barber and Jackson, male and female duo (first names unknown)
24. Bard and Pearl (1923) Wilkie Bard and Jack Pearl in early tests for Phonofilm (in UCLA Film and Television Archive database)
25. Barking Dog (1921) experimental film with barking dog
26. The Barrister (June 1928) with George Robey, directed by Hugh Croise
27. Being All Alone (1927)
28. Bella Donna (1923) Paramount Pictures feature film directed by George Fitzmaurice and starring Pola Negri and Conway Tearle
29. Ben Bernie and All the Lads (1925) with Oscar Levant on piano
30. Bernice DePasquale (1922) Metropolitan Opera soprano
31. Betty Chester the Well-Known Star of The Co-Optimists (1926) Chester sings "Pig-Tail Alley"
32. Billy Merson Singing Desdemona (1926)
33. Billy Merson in Scotland's Whiskey (1927) parody of Sir Harry Lauder
34. Billy Merson in Russian Opera (1927)
35. Bleak House (1926) aka Grandfather Smallweed, the Miser (UK title) with Bransby Williams***
36. Boat Race (1929) The Oxford and Cambridge University Boat Race of March 23, 1929 ("centenary year") listed in BFI Database
37. Boheme Blue (1927) musical short
38. A Boston Star: Borrah Minnevitch (1923) harmonicist*
39. The Bride (1929) comedy short with George Robey
40. Bring on the Bride (August 1929) comedy short, directed by Harry Delf, with Betty Lancaster, Cecil Holm, and Edward O'Connor
41. Brooke Johns and Goodee Montgomery (1925) Johns plays ukulele and Montgomery sings "I'm in Love Again" and dances***
42. The Burglar and the Girl (1928) comedy short with Moore Marriott and Dorothy Boyd
43. By the Light of the Silvery Moon (1926) the last of the Fleischer "Song Car-Tunes" with Phonofilm, released August 1926**
44. Call Me Up Some Rainy Afternoon (1926)**
45. Calm as the Night (1927) sung by soprano Mary Cavanova (Marie Cavan)
46. Canoodling (1928) Hal Jones sings song "Canoodling" from stage review Splinters
47. Carrie From Lancasheer (October 1928)
48. Carson and Shean (1926) ?Carson and Al Shean (SilentEra and BFI Database)
49. Casey at the Bat (1922) famous poem read by actor DeWolf Hopper
50. Cellist and Pianist (1928) two women play Saint-Saëns' "The Swan" from Carnival of the Animals; ?same as Jerome and France (see below)
51. Charles Lindbergh (1927) filmed at Clapham Studios in London on Lindbergh's departure from the UK
52. Charles Lindbergh Reception (1927) Lindbergh receives Medal of Valor from NYC mayor Jimmy Walker on June 13, 1927
53. Charles Ross Taggart (1923) "The Old Country Fiddler at the Singing School"*
54. Charles William Eliot (1924) former president of Harvard University gives speech (?at 1924 Democratic Convention)
55. Charles "Chic" Sale (1922) "famed monologist"
56. Charmaine (1928) musical short with Eric Marshall singing
57. Chorus Gentlemen (1926) or Chorus, Gentlemen!
58. Christmas Party (UK, December 1928) with Fred Elizalde and his Orchestra
59. Clapham and Dwyer No. 1 (1929) Charles Clapham and Bill Dwyer
60. Clapham and Dwyer No. 2 (1929) Charles Clapham and Bill Dwyer
61. The Cleaner (1928) comedy short with Wilkie Bard
62. Clonk! (1928) musical short with Arty Ash and Leslie Sarony, directed by Widgey R. Newman
63. Clyde Doerr and His Sax-o-Phone Sextet (1923)
64. The Coffee Stall (1927) Mark Lupino (c. 1894-4 April 1930) and Company, directed by George A. Cooper
65. Cohen on the Telephone (1923) also known as Monroe Silver, Famed Monologist with monologist Monroe Silver*
66. Come Take a Trip in My Airship (1924) one of the first in the Fleischer "Song Car-Tune" series**
67. Comin' Thro' the Rye (1926)**
68. Conchita Piquer (1923) in dance sketch "From Far Seville"*
69. The Covered Wagon (1923) Paramount Pictures feature directed by James Cruze
70. Cuando fui león (1928) Spanish producer purchased rights from DeForest for "Fonofilm"
71. Cuban Sound Documentary (1926) with the Cuban national anthem and excerpts of The Merry Widow
72. Daisy Bell (1925)**
73. Dandy George and Rosie (1927) Dandy George (Albert George Spink) and his dog Rosie
74. Darling Nelly Gray (1926)**
75. David Gusikoff (1924) vibraphonist
76. Der rote Kreis (1929) aka The Crimson Circle, UK-German feature based on Edgar Wallace novel, trade-shown in March 1929 in the UK
77. Dick Henderson Sings "I Love Her All the More" (1926)
78. Dick Henderson Sings "Tripe" (1926)
79. Dick Henderson Sings "There Are More Heavens Than One" (1927)
80. Die Nibelungen (1924), part I, "Siegfried" (only at the U.S. premiere in NYC on August 23, 1925)
81. Dixie (1925)**
82. Doing His Duty (1929) comedy short of Ernie Lotinga playing "Jimmy Josser", directed by Hugh Croise
83. Dolly Gray (1926)**
84. Domen (1924) Swedish language version of Retribution (1924), directed by Arthur Donaldson, Swedish actor and director
85. Donald Brian (1925) in Peggy O'Hooligan
86. Downey and Owens (1925) Morton Downey (Sr.) and ?Owens ("Two Boys and a Piano") sing "Show Me the Way to Go Home" and "There Is No One Like Myself"
87. The Duke and Duchess of York Arrive at Farm Cove (1927) film first shown May 12, 1927, at the Lyceum in Sydney, Australia
88. Dunio and Gegna (1927) instrumental comedians, play "Yes Sir, That's My Baby" on violin and cello (BFI Database)
89. Drink to Me Only (1926) Gwen Farrar (1899–1944) sings title song
90. East Side, West Side (1925) also known as "The Sidewalks of New York"**
91. Edith Sitwell (1927) reads from her work
92. El misterio de la Puerta del Sol (1929) first sound feature film made in Spain
93. Elga Collins the Versatile Entertainer (1927) Collins sings "Ain't It Nice" and "Tonight You Belong to Me"
94. Emmie Joyce Sings "I Need Love" (1927)
95. Emmie Joyce Sings "Patience" (1927)
96. En confesionario (1928)
97. Ethel Hook (1926) song by contralto Ethel Hook, sister of classical singer Clara Butt
98. Eubie Blake Plays His "Fantasy on Swanee River" (1923)
99. Eva Puck and Sammy White (1923) doing their sketch "Opera vs. Jazz"*
100. Everybody's Doing It (1926)**
101. The Fair Maid of Perth (1926) live-action UK film with Louise Maurel, directed by Miles Mander
102. False Colours (1927) dramatic short with Ursula Jeans and A. B. Imeson, directed by Miles Mander
103. Fannie Ward (1924) Fannie Ward sings "Father Time"
104. Fannie Ward (1924) performs comedy sketch as the "Perennial Flapper"
105. Farewell Message of Mr. Levine and Captain Hinchcliffe, Just Before Their Departure on Their Return Flight to America (1927) with Charles A. Levine and Capt. Walter G. R. Hinchliffe
106. Femina Quartette Nr. 1 (1928) with Elizabeth Hyde (soprano), Brenda Hales (cellist), Yvonne Black (pianist) performing (BFI Database)
107. A Few Moments With Eddie Cantor, Star of "Kid Boots" (late 1923, early 1924)
108. The Fire Brigade (October 1928) with Robb Wilton
109. Five Minutes with Al Smith (1924) Franklin D. Roosevelt introduces Smith at 1924 Democratic Convention
110. The Flat Charleston (1926) with Santos Casani and Josie Lennard
111. The 'Flu That Flew (May 1928)
112. Flying Jenny Airplane (1921) experimental film with Curtiss JN-4 ("Jenny") airplane
113. The Four Bachelors (1924) singing quartet
114. Franklin D. Roosevelt Speech (1924) filmed at 1924 Democratic National Convention in NYC
115. Frivolous Fragments (1927) comedy sketch with Alec Daimler and Dora Eadie
116. Futuritzy (June 24, 1928) Felix the Cat short, directed by Otto Messmer, produced by Pat Sullivan, released by Educational Pictures; re-released in 1929 by Copley Pictures
117. The Gentleman (1925) first sound-on-film UK film, directed by William J. Elliott, excerpt of The 9 to 11 Revue by Harold Simpson and Morris Harvey
118. George Bernard Shaw (1927) one year before similar film Greeting by George Bernard Shaw released by Fox Movietone News in June 1928
119. George Jackley (1885–1950), the Indignant Comedian in "A Doggy Ditty" (1927)
120. George Jessel (1924) comedy sketch by Jessel
121. Gilland Singer (1927) M. Gilland from France sings, dressed as wounded World War I soldier
122. Gimme the Hat (1927)
123. Gloria Swanson Dialogue (1925), Gloria Swanson, Henri de la Falaise, and Thomas Meighan directed by Allan Dwan, in film for The Lambs annual "Spring Gambol" presented at the Metropolitan Opera House, showing Swanson trying to crash the all-male club; Meighan also hosted the live Gambol event (April 26, 1925)
124. Goodbye My Lady Love (1924)**
125. Gordon Freeman (1924) and his "crazy inventions"
126. Gorno's Italian Marionettes (1928) aka Die singenden Marionetten
127. Gwen Farrar (1899–1944) cellist Farrar performs "Drink to Me Only With Thine Eyes" (1926)
128. Gwen Farrar and songwriter Billy Mayerl perform "I've Got a Sweetie on the Radio" (1926)
129. Hal Brown Lancashire Comedian (1928)
130. The Harlequin's Serenade (no further identification of performer; in original April 15, 1923, program)*
131. Harrigan and Altworth (1922) early DeForest test film
132. Harry and Max Nesbitt (1927) film sometimes listed as "Yid Nesbitt" (Max's nickname), brothers from South Africa in "vocal, verbal, and terpsichorean tidbits"
133. Harry Shalson the Popular Entertainer (1927) Shalson sings "You Go Too Far"
134. Has Anybody Here Seen Kelly? (1926) Fleischer cartoon originally with green and orange tinting**
135. The Hawaiian Revellers (1928) with Kahola Marsh and His Hawaiian Orchestra
136. Hedicashun (1929) monologue by A. W. Goodwin
137. Helen Lewis and Her All-Girl Jazz Syncopators (1925) Lewis leads her all-female band
138. Helen Menken (1925) Broadway star Helen Menken
139. Henry Cass Demonstration Film (1923)* also at the Engineers Society Auditorium in NYC on April 12, 1923
140. Her Unborn Child (1930) last feature film made in Phonofilm, directed by Albert Ray (screen debut of Elisha Cook)
141. His Night Out (1924) comedy short with Fred Ardath, Bob Albright, and The McCarthy Sisters
142. His Rest Day (1927) comedy short directed by George A. Cooper with Matthew Boulton as Bill Gosling
143. Hot Tips (1929) comedy short released by Ellbee Pictures
144. Hot Water and Vegetabuel (1928) Leslie Sarony sings "When You're Up to Your Neck in Hot Water (Think of the Kettle and Sing)"
145. The Houston Sisters (1926) musical short with Billie and Renee Houston
146. The Hyde Sisters (1928) musical short with The Hyde Sisters
147. I Can't Take You Out of My Dreams (1926) Winnie Collins and Walter Williams sing title song
148. I Don't Believe You're in Love With Me (1926) Winnie Collins and Walter Williams sing title song
149. I Don't Care What You Used to Be (1927) Dick Henderson sings title song
150. I Don't Know (1928) Emmie Joyce sings title song
151. I Love a Lassie (1925)**
152. I Want a Pie with a Plum In (1926) Dick Henderson sings title song by Wal Clifford
153. In the Good Old Summer Time (1926)**
154. An Intimate Interlude (1928) comedy short with Albert Whelan
155. I've Never Seen a Straight Banana (1926) sung by Dick Henderson, song by Ted Waite
156. J. H. Squires' Celesta Octet (1928) aka "Memories of Tschaikovsky" w/The Squires Octet
157. Jack Pearl and Ben Bard (1926) with Bard, Pearl, and Sascha Beaumont
158. Jerome and France (1928) cellist with pianist; ?same as "Cellist and Pianist" (see above)
159. Joe Termini the Somnolent Melodist (1926) specialty musician performs on violin and banjo
160. Joe Theiss Saxotette (1929)
161. John Citizen's Lament (1927) Charles Paton performs song "If Your Face Wants to Smile, We'll Let It In" from revue John Citizen's Lament
162. John W. Davis Campaign Speech (1924), Democratic candidate who lost to Coolidge
163. Josephine Earle (UK, February 1929) musical short; re-released as part of compilation film Musical Medley No. 4 (1932)
164. Josser, KC (1929) comedy short with Ernie Lotinga playing "Jimmy Josser" (possible duplicate of Doing His Duty)
165. The Jubilee Four (1924) gospel quartet
166. Julius Caesar (1926) excerpt from the Shakespeare play, with Basil Gill as Brutus and Malcolm Keen as Cassius
167. Key and Heyworth (1927) duo sing a song (BFI Database)
168. Knee Deep in Daisies (1926) song "I'm Knee-Deep in Daisies (and Head Over Heels in Love)" sung by Paul England and Dorothy Boyd
169. Kollege Kapers (1929) comedy short written and directed by Bobby Harmon
170. La Chauve-Souris (1923) Nikita Balieff's group La Chauve-Souris performing their sketch "Parade of the Wooden Soldiers" (? with Technicolor sequence)*
171. Lee DeForest (1922) De Forest sitting in a chair and explaining Phonofilm
172. Léon Rothier (1923), operatic bass from the Metropolitan Opera
173. Lillian Powell Bubble Dance (1923)* Denishawn dancer Powell dances to a theme by Brahms; film also shown at the Engineers Society Auditorium in NYC April 12, 1923***
174. Lincoln, Man of the People (1923) Edwin Markham reads his poem "Lincoln, Man of the People"
175. The London Four (1927) male voice quartet
176. Love's Old Sweet Song (1923) two-reeler with Louis Wolheim, Donald Gallaher, and Una Merkel, cinematography by Freeman Harrison Owens
177. Luella Paikin (1922) early DeForest test film of singer
178. Lulu (1928) musical short
179. Luna-cy! (1925) 1922 experimental 3-D film by Frederick Ives and Jacob Leventhal re-released with Phonofilm soundtrack May 18, 1925
180. Madelon (1927) Camille Gillard in "Madelon", directed by Widgey Newman
181. Major Issues of the Campaign (1924) compilation of Al Smith, Franklin D. Roosevelt, and John W. Davis short Phonofilms taken at the 1924 Democratic National Convention in NYC (see individual entries)
182. The Man in the Street (1926) short based on Louis N. Parker play, directed by Thomas Bentley, with Wilbur Lenton, John MacAndrews, and Bunty O'Nolan (UK title: Man of Mystery)
183. Margie (1926)**
184. Marie Lloyd (1926) starring Marie Lloyd Jr., daughter of music hall star Marie Lloyd
185. Marie Rappold (1922) Metropolitan Opera star
186. Mark Griver and His Scottish Revellers (1927) perform "She Was Just a Sailor's Sweetheart" and "Ain't She Sweet"—see also Chili Bouchier entry (above) and Pilbeam and His Band entry (below)
187. Max Herzberg (1924) pianist
188. Medevedeff's Balalaika Orchestra (1929)
189. Meet the Family (1929) comedy short with Harry Delf, released by Ellbee Pictures
190. Memories of Lincoln (1925) 91-year-old former legislator Chauncey Depew recalls meeting Abraham Lincoln
191. The Merchant of Venice (1927) the trial scene, with Joyce Lyons and Lewis Casson, perhaps the first sound-on-film reproduction of a scene from a Shakespeare play
192. Mickey (1927)**
193. Mira la Blanca Luna (UK/Czech, 1936) Rossini aria sung by tenor Otakar Mařák and soprano Marie Cavan (Mary Cavanova)
194. Mirth and Magic (1928) unidentified magician performs his magic act
195. Miss Edith Kelly-Lange (1927) violin solo
196. Miss Lalla Dodd, the Modern Soubrette (1927)
197. Molly Picon (1924) famed Yiddish actress
198. Mother, Mother, Mother Pin a Rose on Me (1924)**
199. Mr. George Mozart the Famous Comedian (1928) comedy short
200. Mr. Smith Wakes Up (1929) comedy short with Elsa Lanchester
201. Mrs. Mephistopheles (1929) comedy short with George Robey as title character, directed by Hugh Croise
202. A Musical Monologue (1923) with Phil Baker and his accordion*
203. My Bonnie (1925) aka My Bonnie Lies Over the Ocean**
204. My Old Kentucky Home (1926) first to use "Follow the Bouncing Ball"**
205. My Wife's Gone to the Country (1926)**
206. Nan Wild (November 1927) directed by George A. Cooper
207. Nap (1928) with Ernie Lotinga as Josser, directed by Hugh Croise
208. Nervo and Knox (1926) perform their song "The Love of Phtohtenese" (pronounced "Hot Knees")
209. The New Paris Lido Club Band (1928) directed by Bertram Phillips
210. A Night in Dixie (1925) musical short in Maurice Zouary collection (Library of Congress
211. The Nightingale's Courtship (1927) French clowns, the Plattier Brothers
212. The Nightwatchman (1928) with Wilkie Bard singing his song "The Night Watchman"
213. Noble Sissle and Eubie Blake (1923) perform their song "Affectionate Dan" and "All God's Chillen Got Shoes"
214. Noble Sissle and Eubie Blake Sing Snappy Songs (1923) sing "Sons of Old Black Joe" and "My Swanee Home"
215. Norah Blaney (1927) Blaney plays piano and sings "He's Funny That Way" and "How About Me"
216. Nutcracker Suite (1925)**
217. Oh! How I Hate to Get Up in the Morning (1926)**
218. Oh I Wish I Was in Michigan (1927)**
219. Oh Mabel (1924) early entry in the Fleischer "Sound Car-Tune" series**
220. Oh What a Pal Was Mary (1926)**
221. Oh Suzanna (1925)**
222. Oh, You Beautiful Doll (1926)**
223. Old Black Joe (1926)**
224. Old Folks at Home (1925) ?dupe of "Swanee" entry below**
225. Old Pal Why Don't You Answer Me (1926) also sometimes listed as "My Old Pal" of "Dear Old Pal"**
226. Olly Oakley (November 1927) directed by George A. Cooper; banjoist Oakley was born Joseph Sharpe (b. Birmingham November 26, 1877; d. London January 4, 1943)
227. The Orderly Room (July 1928) comedy short with Ernie Lotinga as Jimmy Josser, directed by Hugh Croise
228. Oscar Earlweiss (1924) "chorus and novelty concert"
229. Pack Up Your Troubles in Your Old Kit-Bag (1926) Fleischer cartoon**
230. Packing Up (1927) dramatic short with Mary Clare and Malcolm Keen, directed by Miles Mander
231. Paul Specht Musical Number (1925)
232. Peace and Quiet (1929) with Ralph Lynn and Winifred Shotter, directed by Sinclair Hill, play by Ronald Jeans
233. Percival and Hill (1927)
234. The Percival Mackey Trio (1929) directed by Bertram Phillips
235. Percy Pryde and His Phonofiddle on the Phonofilm (1928)
236. Philip Ritte and His Revellers (1927)
237. Phonofilm (1923) with Binnie Barnes
238. Pilbeam and His Band With Specialty Dance by the Misses Tosch (1927) jazzy version of "Ain't She Sweet?" (?Arnold Pilbeam, father of Nova Pilbeam). See Chili Bouchier entry and Mark Griver entry (above) which feature same song.
239. Pipe Down (1929) comedy short released by Ellbee Pictures
240. Plastigrams (1924) 1922 experimental 3-D film by Frederick Ives and Jacob Leventhal, re-released with Phonofilm soundtrack on September 22, 1924
241. President Calvin Coolidge, Taken on the White House Grounds (1924) filmed August 11, 1924
242. Punch and Judy (1928)
243. The Radio Bug (September 1926) comedy short, produced by Jack White, directed by Stephen Roberts, and co-starring Phil Dunham, Toy Gallagher and Clem Beauchamp, about delivery of a new radio, released in sound and silent versions by Educational Pictures
244. The Radio Franks (May 1926) NYC radio stars Frank Bessinger and Frank Wright sing "Remember" and "Hooray for Radio"***
245. The Raw Recruit (July 1928) comedy short with Ernie Lotinga as Jimmy Josser, directed by Hugh Croise
246. Raymond Hitchcock Sketch (1924)
247. Retribution (1924) directed by Arthur Donaldson, Swedish actor and director, see also Domen (1924)
248. Rigoletto, Act Two (1923) with opera singer Eva Leoni (1895–1972) shown in NYC on April 12 and 15, 1923; released in the UK in September 1926*
249. Robert M. La Follette Sr. (1924) speech given during 1924 presidential campaign
250. Rocky Road to Dublin (1927)**
251. Roger Wolfe Kahn Musical Number (1925)
252. Romeo et Juliette (1927) tenor Otakar Mařák and soprano Mary Cavanova (Marie Cavan)
253. Safety First (1928) George Robey singing his song "Safety First", directed by Hugh Croise
254. Sailing, Sailing Over the Bounding Main (1925)**
255. Saint Joan (1927) cathedral scene from Shaw's play, with Sybil Thorndike
256. The Samehtini Trio (1927) two ballads and Hungarian dance (possibly Csárdás (Monti)) performed by male trio (pianist, cellist, and vocalist)
257. Sammy Fain and Artie Dunn (1923) before Fain quit to become full-time songwriter
258. Santa Claus (1926) with Basil Gill as Santa Claus
259. Scovell and Wheldon (1927) UK radio stars (male duo) sing "Ukulele Lullaby" and "Fresh Milk Comes From Cows"
260. Scrooge (1928), a monologue from Dickens's A Christmas Carol, with Bransby Williams as Scrooge
261. Sensations of 1927 (1927) Thorpe Bates in excerpt of Lawrence Wright's Sensations of 1927; full title A Few Melodious Moments From Lawrence Wright's "Sensations of 1927" at Onchan Head Pavilion Douglas, I.O.M. (BFI Database)
262. The Sentence of Death (1927) dramatic short directed by Miles Mander and starring Dorothy Boyd (US title: His Great Moment)
263. Sextet from Lucia di Lammermoor (1923) DVD by Zouary shows it to be produced by the ?"Latin American division" of Phonofilm
264. The Sheik of Araby (US, September 1926) Fleischer cartoon**
265. The Sheik of Araby (UK, December 1926) live-action short directed in the UK by Miles Mander
266. Sidney Bernstein Welcomes Phonofilm (1926) shown October 4, 1926, at the Empire Cinema in London
267. So Blue (1927) with ?Delys and Clark
268. Songs of Yesterday (1922) spirituals sung by Abbie (Abbey) Mitchell
269. Sonia Serova Dancers (1924) modern dance group performs to Edvard Grieg's "Song of Spring"
270. Spirits (1929) comedy short with Ernie Lotinga as Jimmy Josser
271. The Stage Hands (1928) comedy short
272. Stringed Harmony (1923) with ukulele and banjo player Roy Smeck*
273. The Sugar Step (1928)
274. The Superior Sex (1928) comedy short with John Henry
275. Swanee River (1925)**
276. Sweet Adeline (1926)**
277. Syncopation and Song (1927) with The Coney Island Six
278. The Tale-Teller Phone (1928) comedy short with Nita Alvarez, Athalie Davis, and Philip Desborough
279. Ta-Ra-Ra-Boom-Dee-Aye (1926)**
280. Teddy Brown (1927)
281. Teddy Brown, Xylophonist (1929)
282. That Brute Simmons (1928) comedy short with Frank Stanmore, Forrester Harvey, and Barbara Gott
283. The Third Gun (1929) three-reel short directed by Geoffrey Barkas
284. Thorpe Bates (1926)
285. The Three Rascals and a Piano (1927)
286. Till the Bells Ring (1926), 45-minute synchronized sound film
287. To See If My Dreams Come True (1927) Jack Hodges sings title song
288. Tommy Lorne and "Dumplings" (1927)
289. Tommy Lorne (1927) sings "The Lard Song"
290. Toot Toot (1926) Fleischer cartoon ("Toot Toot Tootsie"?)**
291. Topsey-Turvey (1927) comedian Arthur Roberts sings "Topsey-Turvey", directed by Bertram Phillips
292. The Toy Shop (1928)
293. The Trail of the Lonesome Pine (1927)**
294. Tramp, Tramp, Tramp the Boys Are Marching (1926)**
295. The Trial Turn (1928) comedy short with Horace Kenney
296. Troy Fassett (1924) comedy short
297. Tulipsky (1924) pianist (famed "peonyist")
298. Tumbledown Shack in Athlone (1927)**
299. Two Sisters (1929) with Rex Lease and Viola Dana
300. Unmasked (1929) mystery feature film directed by Edgar Lewis (released by Weiss Brothers-Artclass Films)
301. The Unwritten Law (UK, 1929) two-reel short directed by Sinclair Hill at Wembley Studios
302. Va usted en punto con el banco (1928)
303. Ventriloquist (1927) with William Frawley as peddler hawking "Hoak" patent medicine and girl (real-life wife Edna Frawley) who becomes the dummy (BFI database)
304. Vicarage Trio—Kerbstone Entertainment (1928)
305. The Victoria Girls (1928) perform "The Doll Dance", their "famous dancing medley"
306. Violet Heming (1925) appeared in "playlet" filmed in Phonofilm (Variety, September 1925)
307. Waiting for the Robert E. Lee (1927)**
308. Weber and Fields (1923) doing their pool hall sketch*
309. Westminster Glee Singers (1927) group directed by Edward Branscombe
310. What the Phonofilm Means (introduced by ?Bart Doyle; in original April 15, 1923, program)*
311. When I Leave This World Behind (1926)**
312. When I Lost You (1926)**
313. When That Yiddisher Band Played an Irish Tune (1926) with Teddy Elben and His Irish Jewzaleers
314. When the Midnight Choo-Choo Leaves for Alabam' (1926)**
315. The Whistler (1926) dramatic short with Louise Maurel, John F. Hamilton, and Reginald Fox, directed by Miles Mander
316. Why Bananas? (1926) with Teddy Elben
317. Wyn Gladwyn, One Person Two Personalities (1928)
318. Yak-A-Hula-Hick-A-Doola (1926)**
319. Yorke and Adams (1927) Augustus Yorke (1860–1939) and Nicholas Adams perform Potash and Perlmutter
320. You and I and My Gondola (1927)
321. Yvette Darnac (1929) radio star Darnac sings Gershwin tune "The Man I Love"

(*) Included in program of Phonofilms at the Rivoli Theater in NYC on April 15, 1923
(**) Fleischer "Song Car-Tunes" series (some titles later re-released by the Fleischers in their "Screen Songs" series, through Paramount Pictures, with new soundtracks recorded in RCA Photophone)
(***) Found in a trunk in Windsor, New South Wales, Australia in early 1976, and restored by the National Film and Sound Archive of Australia

== See also ==
- Photokinema
- Eric Tigerstedt
- Tri-Ergon
- Joseph Tykociński-Tykociner
- List of film formats
- List of film sound systems
