= Hollywood Party (1934 film) =

1934 musical film collaboration

- Theatrical release poster
- Directed by: Richard Boleslawski (Note: uncredited); Allan Dwan (Note: additional sequences; uncredited); Edmund Goulding; Russell Mack; Charles Reisner; Roy Rowland; George Stevens (Note: Laurel and Hardy segments; uncredited); Sam Wood; Walt Disney (Note: animated sequences; uncredited)
- Written by: Howard Dietz; Arthur Kober
- Produced by: Louis Lewyn; Harry Rapf
- Starring: Stan Laurel; Oliver Hardy; Jimmy Durante; Lupe Vélez; Mickey Mouse (Note: voiced by Walt Disney; uncredited)
- Cinematography: James Wong Howe
- Edited by: George Boemler
- Music by: Rodgers and Hart
- Production company: Metro-Goldwyn-Mayer
- Distributed by: Loew's Inc.
- Release date: June 1, 1934 (US)
- Running time: 75 minutes (original); 68 minutes (existing)
- Country: United States
- Language: English

Hollywood Party is a 1934 American pre-Code musical film produced and distributed by Metro-Goldwyn-Mayer (MGM). It stars Laurel and Hardy, Jimmy Durante, Lupe Vélez, Jack Pearl, Charles Butterworth, Polly Moran, and The Three Stooges (in their final appearance for MGM, written by Arthur Kober). Walt Disney Productions produced a Technicolor animated segment titled The Hot Choc-late Soldiers, with music by Nacio Herb Brown and lyrics by Arthur Freed; it includes an appearance by Mickey Mouse, who is voiced by an uncredited Walt Disney and credited alongside the main cast.

== Plot ==
Jungle movie star "Schnarzan" (satirizing Tarzan), is advised by his manager that he needs new lions for his pictures, as his old ones are "worn out". Schnarzan's rival Liondora, who also makes jungle pictures, is determined to buy the new lions himself. An international explorer, Baron Munchausen, intervenes and buys the lions for his friend Schnarzan. Schnarzan celebrates his victory by throwing a huge Hollywood party.

Laurel and Hardy arrive about three quarters into the picture, as the owners of the lions. The baron has given them a bad check for the lions they provided, and they show up at Schnarzan's party to collect their fee in person. Instead, they get into an egg-breaking battle with the fiery Lupe Velez. When Laurel and Hardy never do get paid, they loose the lions on the party. A nightmarish riot ensues, and Schnarzan awakens to find he is just plain Jimmy Durante, who had a crazy dream.

=== The Hot Choc-late Soldiers ===
A group of confectionery soldiers go to war against a neighboring cookie castle. As the army parade through the city streets, Chocolate Ladies and Soldiers' wives blow kisses to bid them goodbye. After multiple thwarted attempts to enter, the soldiers successfully conquer the fort defended by a troop of Gingerbread Soldiers by using a cunning Trojan Horse shaped like a large, candy-colored pigeon. The soldiers then take their Gingerbread prisoners to their city, but the sun beats down on the soldiers and melts them into a river of chocolate.

== Cast ==
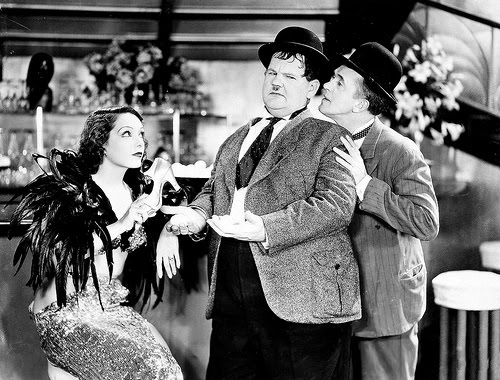
Laurel and Hardy with Lupe Vélez in a scene from the movie

- Stan Laurel as Stan
- Oliver Hardy as Ollie
- Jimmy Durante as Himself/Schnarzan
- Jack Pearl as Baron Munchausen
- Polly Moran as Henrietta Clemp
- Charles Butterworth as Harvey Clemp
- Eddie Quillan as Bob Benson
- June Clyde as Linda Clemp
- Lupe Vélez as Jungle Woman/Jane in Schnarzan Sequence
- George Givot as Liondora, aka Grand Royal Duke Nicholas
- Richard Carle as Producer Knapp
- Edwin Maxwell as Producer Buddy Goldfarb
- Ted Healy as Reporter
- The Three Stooges (Moe Howard, Larry Fine, and Curly Howard) as Themselves
- Clarence Wilson as Scientist
- Richard Cramer as Scientist
- Nora Cecil as Offended Matron
- Robert Young as Radio Announcer
- Jeanne Olsen as herself (Mrs. Jimmy Durante)
- Tom London as Paul Revere
- Arthur Treacher as Durante's English Butler
- Tom Kennedy as Durante's American Butler
- Beatrice Hagen as Show Girl/Party Guest
- Bess Flowers as Party Guest

=== Voice cast ===
- Walt Disney as Mickey Mouse (uncredited)

== Production ==
Hollywood Party was originally intended as an all-star attraction, like the studio's successful The Hollywood Revue of 1929 produced by Harry Rapf. During production, the movie was known as The Hollywood Revue of 1933 and Star Spangled Banquet. Rapf's 1933 revue would star Jean Harlow, Joan Crawford, Marie Dressler, and Lee Tracy, supported by studio comedians Jimmy Durante, Lupe Vélez, Charles Butterworth, and Jack Pearl. After a series of expensive rewrites and revisions, with numerous directors taking a hand in the filming, only the comedians remained, with Polly Moran, George Givot, and Ted Healy and his (Three) Stooges augmenting the cast. Laurel and Hardy were borrowed from producer Hal Roach to appear in the final section of the film. The revue format was abandoned, and the film became a farcical comedy with music.

Production proceeded on a haphazard course, with many hands taking turns at the helm. It has been asserted that Richard Boleslavski directed much of the film, with various scenes directed by Allan Dwan, Edmund Goulding, Russell Mack, Roy Rowland, Sam Wood, and finally Charles Reisner. George Stevens directed the Laurel and Hardy sequence and Dave Gould directed the "Feelin' High" dance number with choreography by Georgie Hale. Seymour Felix and Eddie Prinz directed final musical retakes. Around the Metro-Goldwyn-Mayer backlot, the choreographers of the dance sequences were competing with those staging the MGM movie Dancing Lady, vying to see who could create the most elaborate dance number.

The movie had many sequences cut or reshot after several references proved too esoteric for international audiences. A sequence that had featured Thelma Todd (impersonating Mae West), Lupe Vélez, Jimmy Durante, and ZaSu Pitts playing bridge was deleted after it was lost on British viewers not yet familiar with the game. Additional episodes that featured actors Herman Bing, Johnny Weissmuller, Jackie Cooper, and Max Baer were cut from the movie. Famed songwriters Rodgers and Hart contributed most of the music. Gus Kahn wrote "Moonlight Serenade" for the 1933 Busby Berkeley movie Footlight Parade. However, when that song was cut from the Warner Bros. picture, it was placed a year later in Hollywood Party and sung by Eddie Quillan.

=== The Hot Choc-late Soldiers ===
In 1933, Metro-Goldwyn-Mayer contracted Walt Disney Productions to create a "'Silly Symphony' type" sequence for the film (then called Hollywood Revue). In the contract, MGM stipulated that they wanted a sequence that was 400 feet in length and that they would pay Disney $64,000 ($80,000 if it was in Technicolor) in four installments, a substantial improvement from Disney's then distributor United Artists' payments. The contract also stated that the short would not appear in 16 mm and television showings of the film and that Disney would create the musical score for the short, with MGM providing the musicians, sound effects, and recording equipment.

One of the segment's original concepts was to focus on movie-star caricatures, which was dropped in favor of the song "Hot Choc-late Soldiers", which was written by MGM songwriters Nacio Herb Brown and Arthur Freed for the short. Despite the earlier contract, the soundtrack was recorded at Disney's studio. Animation for the film was overseen by Ben Sharpsteen, who guided a group of young artists that included Cy Young and Ugo D'Orsi. Production on the short occurred in the summer and fall of 1933 and a completed version of The Hot Choc-late Soldiers was sent to MGM in the beginning of November, only for the studio to return the short with a request to re-work the final scenes featuring the melted chocolate soldiers. The final version of the short was delivered to MGM on January 22, 1934.

The segment is prefaced by a brief cameo by Mickey Mouse (who was voiced by Walt Disney himself) spontaneously appearing and humiliating actor Jimmy Durante. It was not initially intended to be included in the film but came about after a pitch for the character to appear in the 1933 film Meet the Baron was dropped. It represented Mickey's first actual appearance in a feature film. Mickey's appearance was intended to be used as a way to segue to the short, but the scene was subject to a series of re-writes as at this point in time Mickey Mouse shorts were built around "visual, rather than verbal, humor". The script went through so many re-writes that the scene's production took far less time to animate than it did to write. Scriptwriting for the scene began in May 1933 and was completed around late September 1933. The completed scene was delivered to MGM in November 1933.

== Promotion ==
Bob Lynch of MGM's Philadelphia branch was well aware of the film's flimsy structure, and advertised it to local showmen as "a musical travesty". Motion Picture Herald's review withheld critical comment in favor of ways to sell the film: "Names, laughs, and a novel and nutty idea will be the basis of a wide open opportunity for the showman to do some lively selling of this conglomeration of amusing material. And that is the tack to take in the selling, billing it as a comedy riot. The word riot is used in its specific and dictionary [emphasis theirs] sense: a good deal excitedly happening at the same time." Motion Picture Daily summed it up as "just a lot of hilarious nonsense – but what nonsense – on a background that looks like it cost plenty of money."

== Reception ==
"Laurel and Hardy Steal MGM's Hollywood Party", headlined The Hollywood Reporter: their sequence "had last night's audience rolling in the aisles and actually sobbing with laughter. That sequence is worth the price of admission and is the highlight in an otherwise dull musical. It is pretty much of a patchwork; the picture hardly rates the time and money that MGM has expended." Film Daily raved, "Hilarious entertainment of novel design packed with laughs, flash, good music, and marquee names. Very different from anything seen before in the way of musical fare... all in all it is a bargain for anybody's money." Other reviews were more guarded. Wanda Hale of the New York Daily News shrugged, "Look over the cast and take it or leave it. It is only fair to report that many of the customers laughed long and loud at several of the sequences in this cinematic patch-quilt. But there was no rolling in the aisles." Mordaunt Hall of The New York Times wrote that it "may have been very funny while it was being made, but as it comes to the screen it is not a little disappointing." Motion Picture Reviews, published by a panel of all-women reviewers advising what films were fit for adolescents and children, hated Hollywood Party: "With such a collection of so-called comedians, it is strange that anything as completely vacuous as Hollywood Party could have been produced. It is an indiscriminate hodgepodge of comic sequences and songs framed by the slightest suggestion of a story."

Theater managers who played the film submitted their audiences' reactions to Motion Picture Herald. A few reports were positive: "This is certainly a novelty and our patrons liked it. Most all of the funny guys are in it and they were all working. All I can say is, it satisfied all we got in to see it." "This is a very good picture that failed to do business in our town. [Played] one day to only fair business." But most exhibitors were extremely downbeat: "Just a lot of nothing, half thrown together. One of the poorest excuses for a picture we have ever played. Not even funny except about five minutes with Laurel & Hardy, and my patrons want more than a five-minute show for their money." "An A No. 1 flop. Nothing to it. Don't book this one if you wish to please patrons. Business terrible." "Never have I seen a worse, mixed-up mess than this picture was. Picture not liked and the panning was almost unanimous. More squawks on this one than I have had for a long time. For once I agreed with them." "I stood in the lobby all night and apologized to the customers as they came out." Critics like the City University of New York professor David Bakish and Velvet Light Trap's Allen Larson would later comment on how the appearance of Mickey and the introduction of the short felt abrupt and unintegrated with the rest of the film.

== Aftermath ==
The studio regarded Hollywood Party as such an embarrassment that producer Harry Rapf took his name off the film, none of the directors claimed screen credit, and the creative and technical personnel were actually hidden from the public. These credits were traditionally listed at the beginning of every MGM film, on successive title cards, but not in this case: the names of the production personnel were crowded onto a single panel, and only disclosed after the end title.

The film was a box office disaster, posting a loss of $500,000 in Depression dollars, the equivalent of almost $12,000,000 today. It was producer Harry Rapf's last attempt to stage an expensive revue – or any expensive project at all. The failure of Hollywood Party resulted in Rapf being demoted to MGM's short-subjects department. After one of his shorts won a "Best Short Subject" Academy Award (How to Sleep starring Robert Benchley), Rapf returned to low-budget feature productions, which he produced until his death in 1949.

Hollywood Party did recoup some of its losses later. Hal Roach had discontinued his releasing arrangement with MGM in 1938, so MGM would have no further Laurel and Hardy comedies to offer exhibitors. The studio filled the void with a reissue of Hollywood Party in 1939. With its crazy-quilt approach, the film could now pass for a screwball comedy, and its cast of Jimmy Durante, Lupe Vélez, and The Three Stooges now had more name value.

Turner Entertainment Co., through their ownership of pre-May 1986 Metro-Goldwyn-Mayer films, currently owns the film. The Hot Choc-late Soldiers was edited out of the film when it was screened on TNT due to legal concerns with Disney's trademarks. However, Turner was able to negotiate the licenses so that the footage was included in a 1992 VHS release of Hollywood Party and for subsequent releases.

== See also ==
- Laurel and Hardy filmography
- Three Stooges Filmography
- List of early color feature films
