= Lillian Powell =

American actress

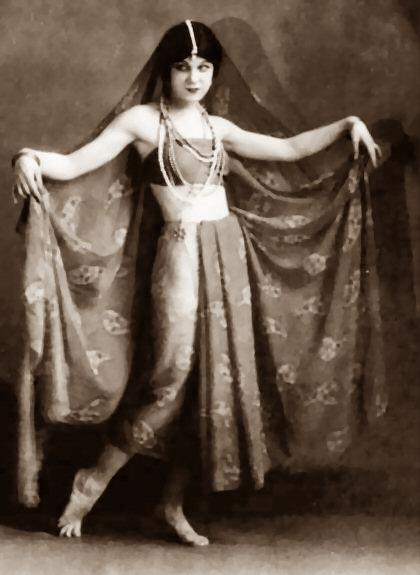
- NYPL Digital Gallery
- Born: Lillian Ruth Powell; May 29, 1896; Victoria, British Columbia
- Died: May 31, 1992 (aged 96); Los Angeles, California
- Occupations: Dancer, teacher and television actress

Lillian Ruth Powell (May 29, 1896 – May 31, 1992) was a Canadian-born American Denishawn-trained dancer who performed in early experimental silent film musicals. She would later teach dance and physical education before embarking on a nearly two-decade career in television.

== Life and career ==
She was born in Victoria, British Columbia, where some six months after her birth she was adopted by Charles and Eliza Powell and brought south to live in Ventura, California. Powell's adoptive parents later divorced and by 1910 she was living in San Diego where Eliza Powell worked as a milliner at a local department store. Powell later studied piano and attended Technical High School in Oakland, California.

By 1918, Powell was a dancer with Ruth St. Denis and Ted Shawn at their Denishawn studio in Hollywood, California. That September she appeared in a Denishawn concert staged at Oakland's Pantages Theatre in a dance called The Driad. The following year she began touring with the Denishawn Dancers playing the title rôle in Julnar of the Sea a spectacular ballet Shawn based on the Arabian Nights character Julnar, the sea queen.

In 1922, Powell performed Shawn's Bubble Dance and one of his Egyptian dances (with Martha Graham) in short silent films by Hugo Riesenfeld in his attempt to synchronize a dance routine on film with a live orchestra and on-screen conductor. On April 15, 1923, Powell appeared in a short film Lillian Powell Bubble Dance, presented in a program of 18 short films made in the Lee DeForest Phonofilm sound-on-film process at the Rivoli Theater in New York City. The films were co-presented by Riesenfeld who was musical director of the Rivoli. A copy of this film was found in 1976 in Australia, and was restored by the National Film and Sound Archive.

In the late 1920s Powell was a dancer with Jack Klein (or Kline) and the Californians, a West Coast vaudeville act.

Miss Lillian Powell, formerly of the big-time Eastern circuits, proved not only one of the most exquisite girls in physical charms, but also the most salient example of dancing grace ever seen in a West Coast theater here. Her numbers include an Oriental nautch dance, and later a famous Grecian balloon number, which the gifted young woman danced for Prince George of England recently at the home of Mr. and Mrs. Douglas Fairbanks at Beverly Hills, when the son of King George visited Pickfair. Miss Powell is modest, clever and graceful beyond compare and deserves her high reputation as a danseuse. She wears lovely gowns, and in one number appeared especially radiant in a white wig.

— Bakersfield Californian, November 24, 1928

By her mid-thirties, Powell was teaching at a Los Angeles area dance studio while continuing to performing on stage at concerts and community events. In 1933, she was a premier dancer with the Michio Itō Dance Company touring Canada and the United States. By her early forties, she had become a physical education teacher with a Los Angeles school district.

In 1954 Powell began acting in television productions. Over a near twenty-year span she played frequent guest or reoccurring roles on such series as Dragnet, The Man Behind the Badge, Noah's Ark and made guest appearances in the shows My Three Sons, Father Knows Best, The Thin Man, Whirlybirds, Cimarron City, Alcoa Presents: One Step Beyond, The Millionaire, The DuPont Show With June Allyson, Ben Casey and Adam-12.

Throughout her career, Powell was frequently used by Jack Webb, creator of Dragnet, appearing in fourteen episodes of Dragnet, six episodes of Noah's Ark, an episode of Adam-12 and a minor rôle in his film The Last Time I Saw Archie.

Powell retired in 1970 and died in 1992 in Los Angeles at the age of 96.

== See also ==
- Phonofilm
