= Love's Old Sweet Song (1923 film) =

1923 film

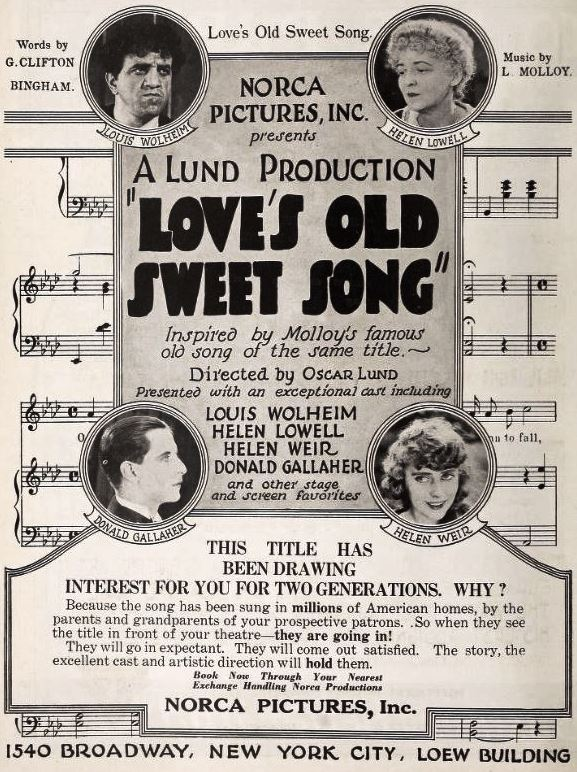
- Trade advertisement
- Directed by: J. Searle Dawley
- Written by: Augustus Bertilla; Jacques Byrne
- Produced by: Lee de Forest
- Starring: Louis Wolheim; Donald Gallaher; Una Merkel
- Cinematography: Freeman Harrison Owens
- Music by: J.L. Molloy (song "Love's Old Sweet Song")
- Production company: Norca Pictures
- Distributed by: De Forest Phonofilm
- Release date: February 1, 1923
- Running time: 20 minutes
- Country: United States
- Language: Silent (English intertitles)

Love's Old Sweet Song is a 1923 American two-reel short film made in the De Forest Phonofilm sound-on-film process. The film was directed by J. Searle Dawley and stars Louis Wolheim, Donald Gallaher, Ernest Hilliard, and Una Merkel in her film debut.

== Cast ==
- Louis Wolheim as The Wanderer
- Helen Weir as Eunice
- Donald Gallaher as Charlie
- Ernest Hilliard as Mother
- Baby Margaret Brown as Babs
- Ernest Hilliard as Power
- Una Merkel

== Production ==
This was one of the few two-reel films produced by Lee de Forest in Phonofilm due to problems with changeovers when the film was projected in theaters. In June 1923, de Forest and the film's cinematographer Freeman Harrison Owens became embroiled in a legal battle over the Phonofilm process and patents.
