= Olga Paršová =

Czech opera singer and teacher (1853–1941)]

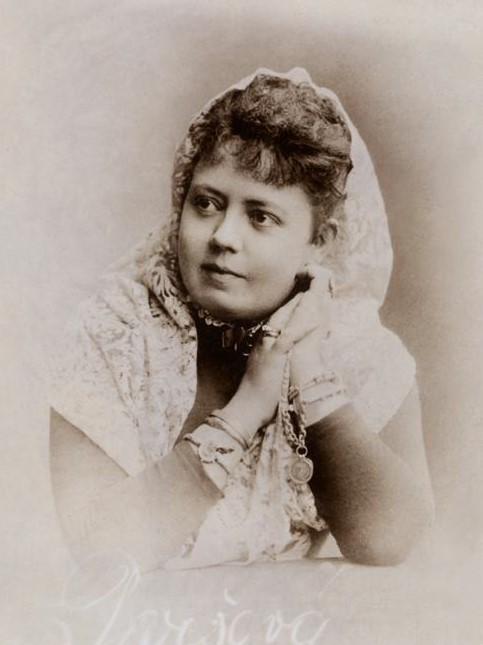
- Paršová c. 1890
- Born: 2 October 1853; Prague, Bohemia, Austria-Hungary
- Died: 7 June 1941 (aged 87); Prague, Protectorate of Bohemia and Moravia
- Other names: Olga Paršová-Zikešová; Olga Žikešová; Olga Zikešová
- Education: Pivodova pěvecká škola, 1872
- Occupations: Opera singer; soprano; voice teacher
- Spouse: Ferdinand Zikeš
- Children: 1

Olga Paršová (married name Paršová-Zikešová; 2 October 1853 – 7 June 1941) was a Czech opera singer, soprano and voice teacher.

== Biography ==
In 1872 Paršová graduated from Pivodova pěvecká škola, a singing school run by František Pivoda. The same year Paršová began working at a theatre in Ulm, German Empire (now Germany). Returning to Austria-Hungary a year later, Paršová worked first in Plzeň before working at the Provisional Theatre during the 1883 to 1884 season. Between 1885 and 1887 Paršová worked across the German Empire.

At the request of František Adolf Šubert Paršová began working at the National Theatre in Prague in 1887. Paršová left the National Theatre in July 1894 and opened a singing school in Prague. Paršová was teacher of Otakar Mařák and Zdeňka Mollendová.

== Personal life ==
Paršová was married to Ferdinand Zikeš, a baritone at the New German Theatre. Paršová and Zikeš had one child.

Paršová died in Prague on 7 June 1941, aged 87.
