= The Man Behind the Badge =

American television police drama series

- Genre: Police drama
- Developed by: Prockter Television Enterprises
- Directed by: John Peyser, Paul Landres
- Starring: Norman Rose (1953-1954)/ Charles Bickford (1955) (Host)
- Theme music composer: Melvyn Lenard
- Country of origin: United States
- Original language: English
- No. of seasons: 2
- No. of episodes: 52 episodes (live, 1953-1954); 38 episodes (filmed, 1955)

Production
- Executive producers: Bernard J. Prockter, Jerome C. Robinson
- Editor: Fred W. Berger
- Running time: 30 mins.
- Production companies: Prockter Television Enterprises; Revue Studios; MCA TV

Original release
- Network: CBS; Syndicated
- Release: October 11, 1953 – September 24, 1955

The Man Behind the Badge is a half-hour American television police drama series which aired on CBS from October 11, 1953, to October 3, 1954, originally hosted by Norman Rose. In its second syndicated season, the host became character actor Charles Bickford. Jerry Robinson was the producer.

The CBS version was broadcast from 9:30 to 10 p.m. Eastern Time on Sundays. It replaced Arthur Murray Party and was replaced by Honestly, Celeste!. The sponsor was Bristol Myers. Everett Rosenthal was the executive producer, with Arthur Singer as director.

Beginning in January 1955, a filmed version of the program was syndicated to local stations by MCA TV.

In an interview with Kliph Nesteroff, assistant director Arthur Marks stated the filmed episodes were shot at the same time and on the same sets as Treasury Men in Action. Bernard J. Prockter produced the series in Hollywood.

== Synopsis ==
The series is based on files from agencies of law enforcement. In addition to police, the subjects of episodes included judges, park rangers, parole officers, and public defenders. Topics of episodes included divorce, life in a boys' home, and rehabilitation.

=== Recurring roles and notable guest stars ===
Actor	Role	Appearances
Norman Rose	Himself	52 episodes
Charles Bickford	Himself	38 episodes
Charles Bronson	Ralph	"The Case of the Invisible Mark" (1955)
Paul Brinegar		3 episodes
Sam Flint		3 episodes
Vivi Janiss		2 episodes
Carolyn Jones	Louise	"The Case of the Desperate Moment" (1955)
Ann McCrea	Laura	"The Case of the One-Armed Bandits" (1955)
Paul Newman		"The St. Paul Story" (1953)
Leslie Nielsen		2 episodes
Anthony Perkins	Pedro	2 episodes
Lillian Powell		3 episodes
Denver Pyle	Detective Lashley	"The Case of the Crying Lady" (1955)
Jason Robards		"The Case of the Last Escape" (1954)
Lee Van Cleef	Floyd	"The Case of the Desperate Moment" (1955)
Jack Warden		"The Portland, Oregon Story" (1953)

== Critical response ==
Dwight Newton, writing in the San Francisco Examiner, said that the first episode "had possibilities but fell apart at the themes." He mentioned transparent acting and too much use of narration in particular and referred to actors who "gesture like they did in the old silent movie days."
