= Charles Ross Taggart =

American comedian and folklorist

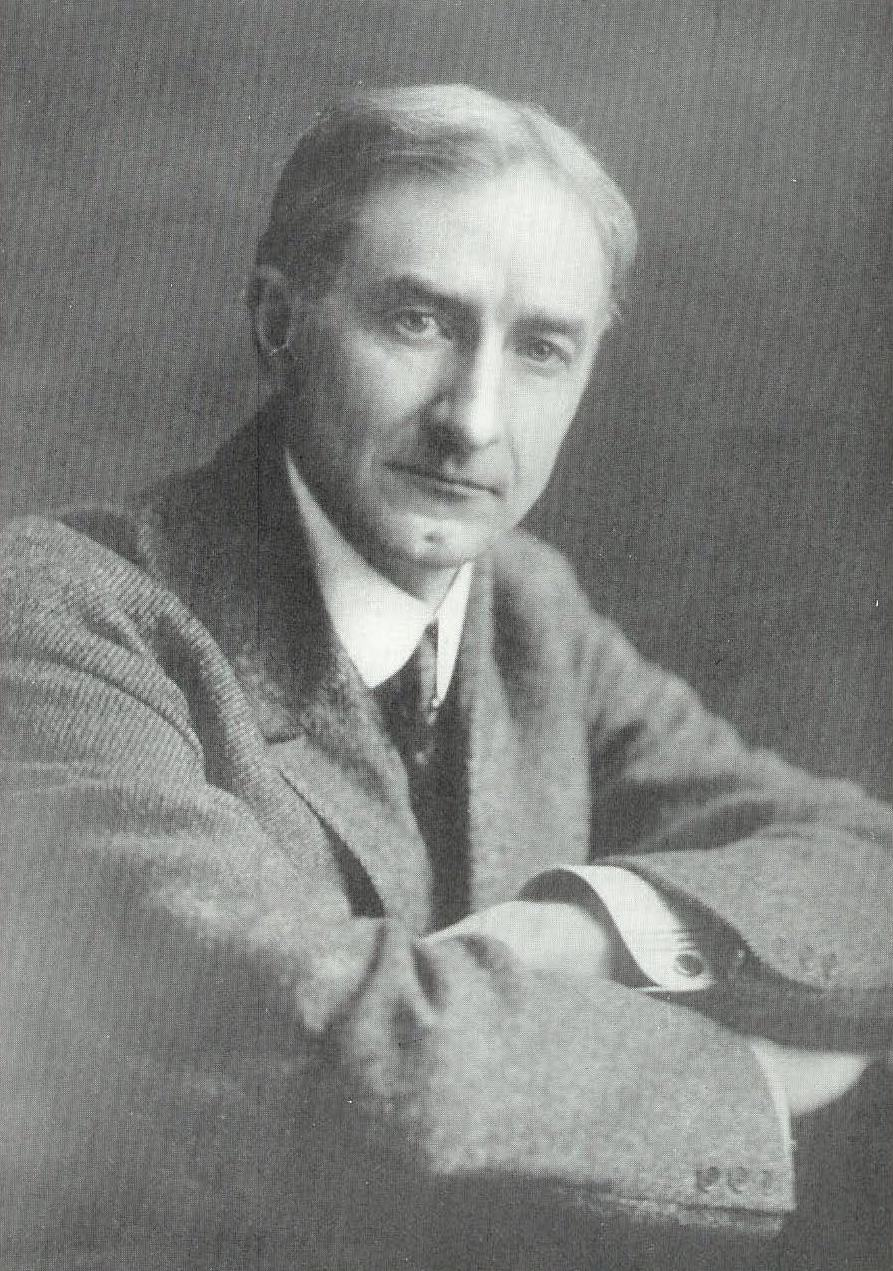
Charles Ross Taggart

Charles Ross Taggart (19 March 1871, Washington, D.C. – 4 July 1953, Kents Hill, Maine) was an American comedian and folklorist who appeared all over North America as "The Man From Vermont" and "The Old Country Fiddler" from 1895 to 1938.

== Career ==
On the Chautauqua circuit, Taggart would perform folk music on his violin, sing, play the piano, do ventriloquism, and tell outlandish stories that supposedly took place in rural New England. Taggart retired from performing less than a year after suffering a stroke in 1937.

Taggart grew up in Topsham, Vermont, later living in Newbury for many years, in a house he called "Elmbank," which overlooked the railroad depot.

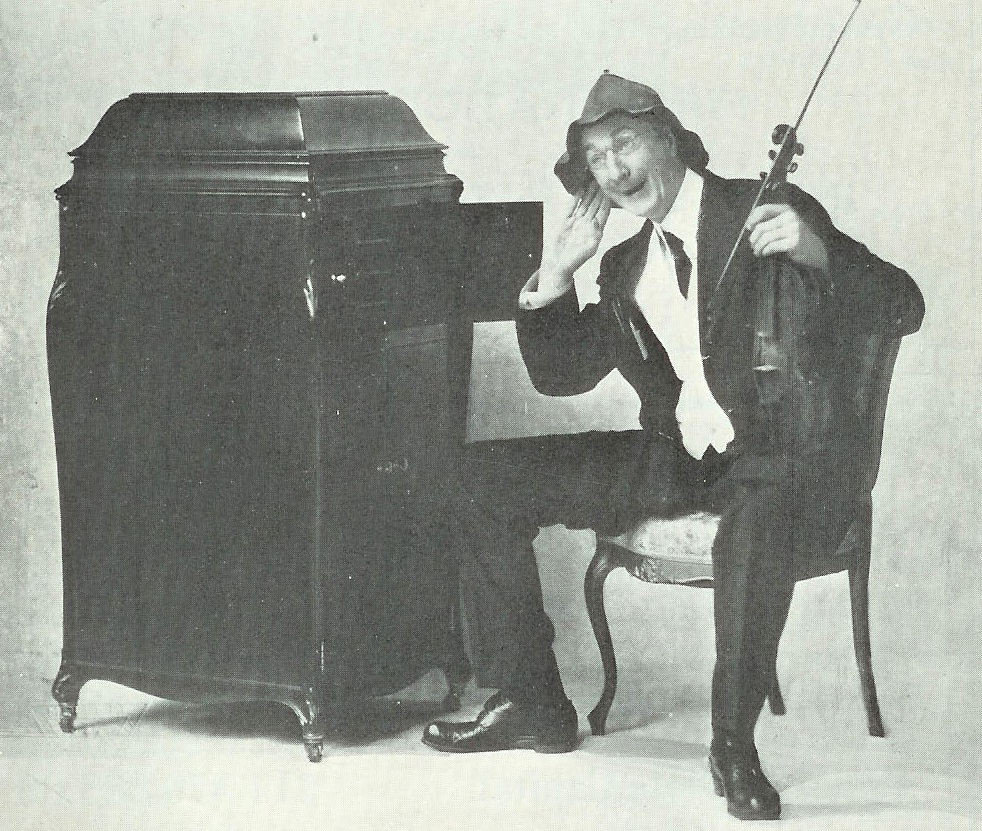
Charles Ross Taggart as the "Old Country Fiddler" in The Vermonter magazine (November 1927)

He would make over 40 recordings of his "Old Country Fiddler" and "Pineville Folks" monologues with various labels, starting in the 1910s, including Edison, Victor, Columbia, and Brunswick.

Lee DeForest filmed Taggart for a short film "The Old Country Fiddler at the Singing School" made in the DeForest Phonofilm sound-on-film process. The film was shown to an invited audience on 12 April 1923 at the Engineering Society Auditorium, and premiered 15 April 1923 at the Rialto Theater in New York City with 17 other films made in the Phonofilm process. This film is now in the Maurice Zouary collection at the Library of Congress.

== See also ==
- Phonofilm
