= Una Merkel =

American actress (1903–1986)

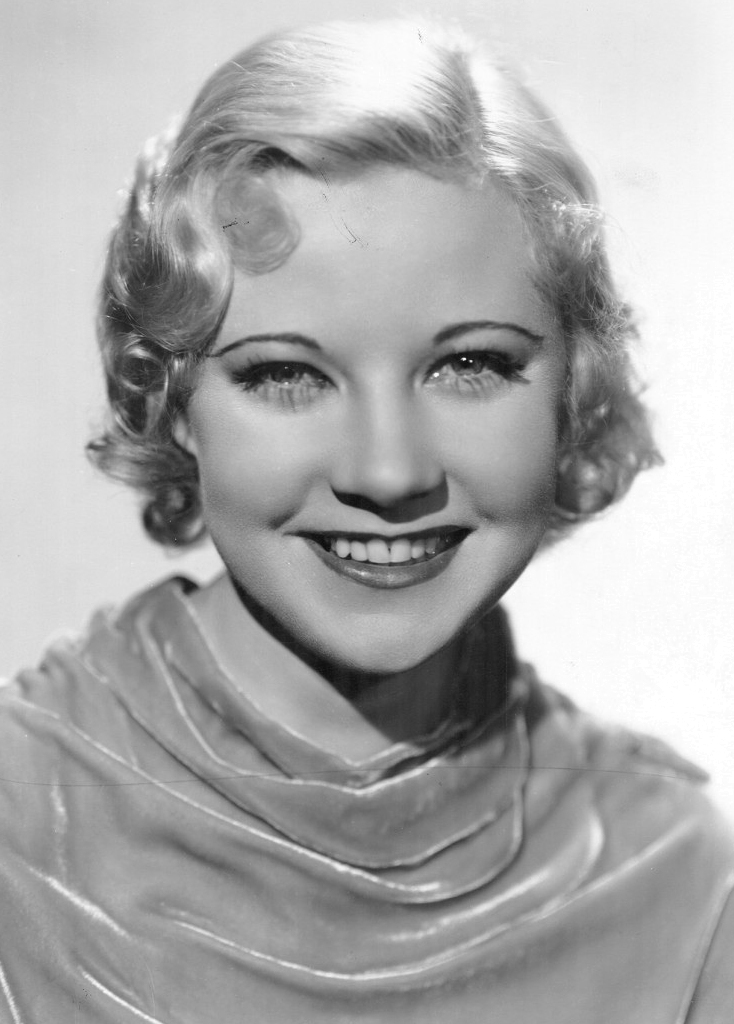
- Merkel in 1934
- Born: December 10, 1903; Covington, Kentucky, U.S.
- Died: January 2, 1986 (aged 82); Los Angeles, California, U.S.
- Resting place: Highland Cemetery, Fort Mitchell, Kentucky
- Years active: 1920–1968
- Spouse: Ronald Burla (m. 1932; div. 1947)

Una Merkel (December 10, 1903 – January 2, 1986) was an American stage, film, radio, and television actress.

Merkel was born in Kentucky and acted on stage in New York in the 1920s. She went to Hollywood in 1930 and became a popular film actress. Two of her best-known performances are in the films 42nd Street and Destry Rides Again. She won a Tony Award in 1956 and was nominated for an Oscar in 1961.

== Early life ==
Merkel was born on December 10, 1903, in Covington, Kentucky, to Bessie (née Phares) and Arno E. Merkel Jr. Her parents married in Covington on December 31, 1902. Una attended First and Sixth District Schools in Covington, Kentucky. Their home was at the corner of Fourth and Greenup Streets, since demolished in 1976. Una lived in Covington until her early teens.

In her early childhood, she lived in many of the Southern United States due to her father's job as a traveling salesman. At the age of 15, she and her parents moved to Philadelphia. They stayed there a year or so before settling in New York City, where she began attending the (Claude M.) Alviene School Of Dance Arts.

== Career ==
Because of her strong resemblance to actress Lillian Gish, Merkel was offered a part as Gish's youngest sister in a silent film called World Shadows. However, the funding for the film dried up and it was never completed. Merkel went on to appear in a few silent movies, several of them for the Lee-Bradford Corporation. She also appeared in the two-reel Love's Old Sweet Song (1923), which was made by Lee de Forest in his Phonofilm sound-on-film process and starred Helen Weir and Louis Wolheim. Not making much of a mark in films, Merkel turned her attention to the theater and found work in several important plays on Broadway. Her biggest triumph was in Coquette (1927), which starred her idol, Helen Hayes.

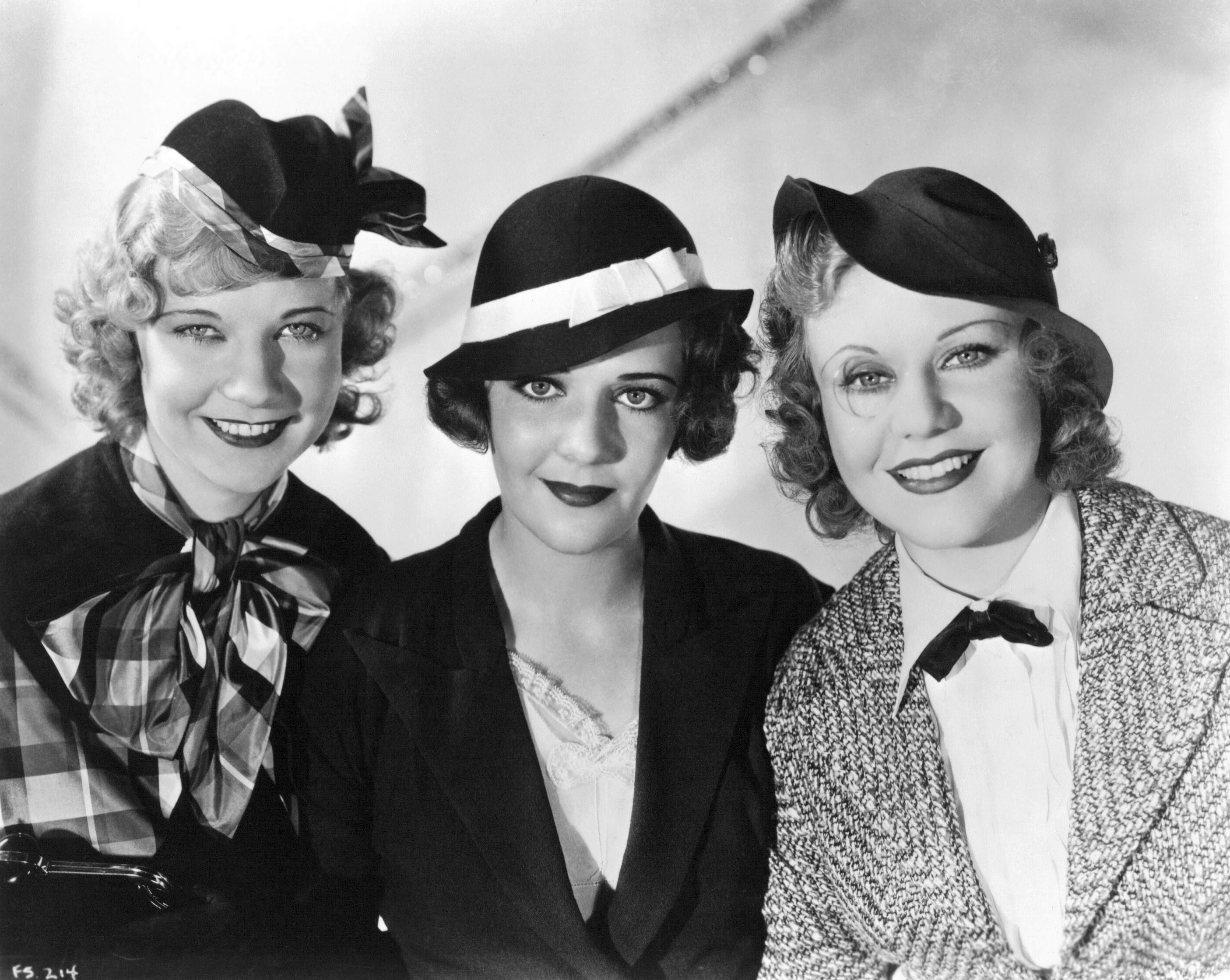
Una Merkel, Ruby Keeler and Ginger Rogers in 42nd Street (1933)

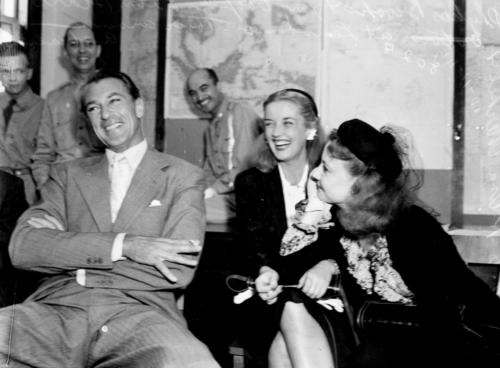
Una Merkel (right) with Phyllis Brooks and Gary Cooper at a Brisbane press conference on their way to entertain the troops (1943)

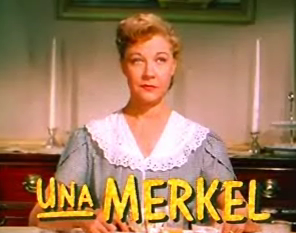
As Mom Schneider in I Love Melvin (1953)

Invited to Hollywood by director D. W. Griffith to play Ann Rutledge in his film Abraham Lincoln (1930), Merkel became a big success in sound films. During the 1930s, she became a popular second lead in a number of films, usually playing the wisecracking best friend of the heroine, supporting actresses such as Jean Harlow, Carole Lombard, Loretta Young, and Eleanor Powell.

Merkel was known for her Kewpie-doll looks, strong Southern accent, and wry line delivery. She played Sam Spade's secretary in the original 1931 version of The Maltese Falcon. Merkel was a Metro-Goldwyn-Mayer contract player from 1932 to 1938, appearing in as many as 12 films in a year, often on loan-out to other studios. She was also often cast as leading lady opposite Jack Benny, Harold Lloyd, Franchot Tone, and Charles Butterworth, among others.

In 42nd Street (1933), Merkel played a streetwise show girl. In the famous "Shuffle Off to Buffalo" number, Merkel and Ginger Rogers sang the verse: "Matrimony is baloney. She'll be wanting alimony in a year or so./Still they go and shuffle, shuffle off to Buffalo." Merkel appeared in both the 1934 and the 1952 film versions of The Merry Widow, playing different roles. She received second billing in The Good Old Soak (1937) with Wallace Beery and Ted Healy in the same year that Healy died mysteriously.

One of her most famous roles was in the Western comedy Destry Rides Again (1939), in which her character, Lily Belle, gets into a famous "cat-fight" with Frenchie (Marlene Dietrich) over the possession of her husband's trousers, won by Frenchie in a crooked card game. She played the elder daughter to the W. C. Fields character, Egbert Sousé, in the 1940 film The Bank Dick. Her film career went into decline during the 1940s, although she continued working in smaller productions and in radio as Adeline Fairchild on The Great Gildersleeve. In 1950, she starred with William Bendix in the baseball comedy Kill the Umpire, which was a surprise hit.

She made a comeback as a middle-aged woman playing mothers and maiden aunts, and in 1956 won a Tony Award for her role on Broadway in The Ponder Heart, adapted from the novella of the same name. She had a major part in the MGM 1959 film The Mating Game as Paul Douglas's character's wife and Debbie Reynolds' character's mother, and was nominated for an Academy Award for Best Supporting Actress in Summer and Smoke (1961). She was also featured as Brian Keith's character's housekeeper, Verbena, in the Walt Disney comedy The Parent Trap in 1961. Her final film role was opposite Elvis Presley in Spinout (1966).

== Personal life and death ==
Merkel was a lifelong Methodist.

In 1932, Merkel married North American Aviation executive Ronald Lucin Burla. They separated in April 1944. Merkel filed for divorce on December 19, 1946, in Miami, which was granted in March 1947. The couple had no children.

On March 5, 1945, Merkel was nearly killed when her mother Bessie, with whom she shared an apartment in New York City, died by suicide by gassing herself. Merkel was overcome by the five gas jets her mother had turned on in their kitchen and was found unconscious in her bedroom.

On March 4, 1952, seven years almost to the day after her mother died, Merkel overdosed on sleeping pills. She was found unconscious by a nurse who was caring for her at the time and remained in a coma for a day before recovering.

On January 2, 1986, Merkel died in Los Angeles at the age of 82. She is buried near her parents, Arno and Bessie Merkel, in Highland Cemetery in Fort Mitchell, Kentucky.

== Legacy ==
For her contribution to the motion picture industry, Una Merkel has a star on the Hollywood Walk of Fame (6230 Hollywood Boulevard). In 1991, a historical marker was dedicated to her in her hometown of Covington.

== Filmography ==
=== Films ===
Year	Title	Role	Notes
1923	Love's Old Sweet Song		Short
1924	The Fifth Horseman	Dorothy	
1930	Abraham Lincoln	Ann Rutledge	
1930	The Eyes of the World	Sybil	
1930	The Bat Whispers	Dale Van Gorder	
1931	Command Performance	Princess Katerina	
1931	Don't Bet on Women	Tallulah Hope	
1931	Six Cylinder Love	Margaret Rogers	
1931	The Maltese Falcon	Effie Perine	
1931	Daddy Long Legs	Sally McBride	
1931	The Bargain	Etta	
1931	Wicked	June	
1931	The Secret Witness	Lois Martin	
1931	Private Lives	Sibyl	
1932	She Wanted a Millionaire	Mary Taylor	
1932	The Impatient Maiden	Betty Merrick	
1932	Man Wanted	Ruth 'Ruthie' Holman	
1932	Huddle	Thelma	
1932	Red-Headed Woman	Sally	
1932	They Call It Sin	Dixie Dare	
1932	Men Are Such Fools	Molly	
1933	Whistling in the Dark	Toby Van Buren	
1933	The Secret of Madame Blanche	Ella	
1933	42nd Street	Lorraine Fleming	
1933	Clear All Wires!	Dolly	
1933	Reunion in Vienna	Ilsa Hinrich	
1933	Midnight Mary	Bunny	
1933	Her First Mate	Hattie	
1933	Broadway to Hollywood	Flirt in Audience	Uncredited
1933	Beauty for Sale	Carol Merrick	
1933	Menu	Mrs. Omsk	Short, uncredited
1933	Bombshell	Mac	
1933	Day of Reckoning	Mamie	
1933	The Women in His Life	Miss 'Simmy' Simmons	
1934	This Side of Heaven	Birdie	
1934	Murder in the Private Car	Georgia Latham	
1934	Paris Interlude	Cassie	
1934	The Cat's-Paw	Pet Pratt	
1934	Bulldog Drummond Strikes Back	Gwen	
1934	Have a Heart	Joan O'Day	
1934	The Merry Widow	Queen Dolores	
1934	Evelyn Prentice	Amy Drexel	
1935	Biography of a Bachelor Girl	Slade Kinnicott	
1935	The Night Is Young	Fanni Kerner	
1935	One New York Night	Phoebe	
1935	Baby Face Harrington	Millicent	
1935	Murder in the Fleet	'Toots' Timmons	
1935	Broadway Melody of 1936	Kitty Corbett	
1935	It's in the Air	Alice Lane Churchill	
1936	Riffraff	Lil Bundt	
1936	Speed	Josephine Sanderson	
1936	We Went to College	Susan Standish	
1936	Born to Dance	Jenny Saks	
1937	Don't Tell the Wife	Nancy Dorsey	
1937	The Good Old Soak	Nellie	
1937	Saratoga	Fritzi	
1937	Checkers	Mamie Appleby	
1937	True Confession	Daisy McClure	
1939	Four Girls in White	Gertie Robbins	
1939	Some Like It Hot	Flo Saunders	
1939	On Borrowed Time	Marcia Giles	
1939	Destry Rides Again	Lily Belle	
1940	Comin' Round the Mountain	Belinda Watters	
1940	Sandy Gets Her Man	Nan Clark	
1940	The Bank Dick	Myrtle Sousé	
1941	Double Date	Aunt Elsie Kirkland	
1941	Road to Zanzibar	Julia Quimby	
1941	Cracked Nuts	Sharon Knight	
1942	The Mad Doctor of Market Street	Aunt Margaret Wentworth	
1942	Twin Beds	Lydia	
1943	This Is the Army	Rose Dibble	
1943	Quack Service	Daffy	Short
1944	To Heir Is Human	Una	Short
1944	Sweethearts of the U.S.A.	Patsy Wilkins	
1947	It's a Joke, Son!	Mrs. Magnolia Claghorn	
1948	The Bride Goes Wild	Miss Doberly	
1948	The Man from Texas	Widow Weeks	
1950	Kill the Umpire	Betty Johnson	
1950	My Blue Heaven	Miss Irma Gilbert	
1950	Emergency Wedding	Emma	
1951	Rich, Young and Pretty	Glynnie	
1951	A Millionaire for Christy	Patsy Clifford	
1951	Golden Girl	Mary Ann Crabtree	
1952	With a Song in My Heart	Sister Marie	
1952	The Merry Widow	Kitty Riley	
1953	I Love Melvin	Mom Schneider	
1955	The Kentuckian	Sophie Wakefield	
1956	The Kettles in the Ozarks	Miss Bedelia Baines	
1956	Bundle of Joy	Mrs. Dugan	
1957	The Fuzzy Pink Nightgown	Bertha	
1958	The Girl Most Likely	Mother	
1959	The Mating Game	Ma Larkin	
1961	The Parent Trap	Verbena	
1961	Summer and Smoke	Mrs. Winemiller	
1963	Summer Magic	Mariah Popham	
1964	A Tiger Walks	Mrs. Watkins	
1966	Spinout	Violet Ranley	

=== Television ===
Year	Title	Role	Notes
1952	Four Star Playhouse	Rose Barton	"My Wife Geraldine"
1953	Schlitz Playhouse of Stars		"Guardian of the Clock"
1953	Your Jeweler's Showcase		"The Monkey's Paw"
1953	Willys Theatre Presenting Ben Hecht's Tales of the City		"Miracle in the Rain"
1954	Westinghouse Studio One	Parsis McHugh	"Two Little Minks"
1955	Kraft Television Theatre		"Trucks Welcome"
1956	Calling Terry Conway	Pearl McGrath	TV film
1957	Playhouse 90	Louise Hoagland	"The Greer Case"
1957	The Red Skelton Show	Mrs. Van Wyck	"Freddie and the Happy Helper"
1957	Climax!	Maud	"The Secret of the Red Room"
1958	DuPont Show of the Month	Aladdin's Mother	"Cole Porter's 'Aladdin'"
1958	The United States Steel Hour		"Flint and Fire"
1962	The Real McCoys	Mrs. Gaylord	"The New Housekeeper"
1963	The Bill Dana Show	Mrs. Hatten	"The Poker Game"
1963–1965	Burke's Law	Clara Lovelace / Mrs. Thomas Barrett / Miss Samantha Cartier	3 episodes
1964	The Cara Williams Show	Amelia Hofstetter	"Amelia Hofstetter, Please Go Home"
1964	Destry	Granny Farrell	"Law and Order Day"
1968	I Spy	Aunt Alma	"Home to Judgment"
