= Jack Pearl =

American vaudeville performer and radio actor

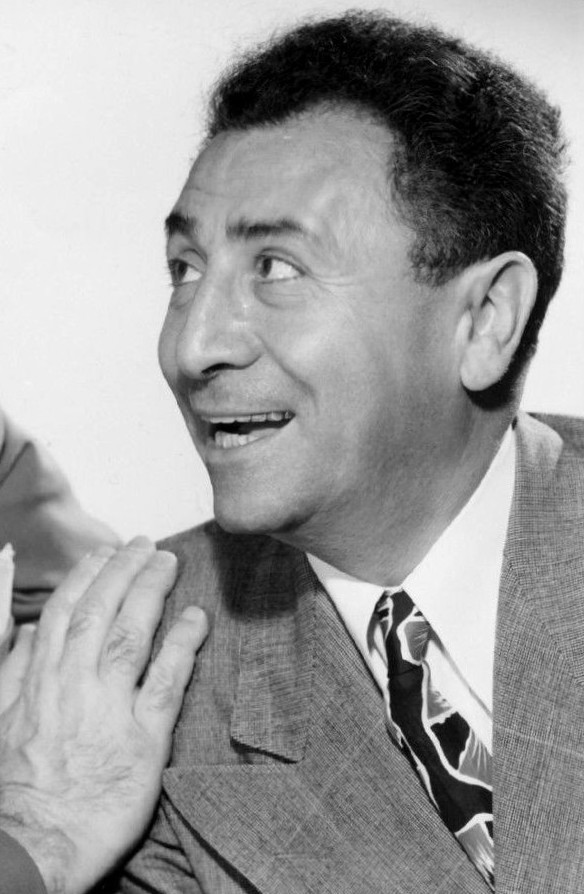
- Pearl in 1952
- Born: Jack Perlman; October 29, 1894; New York City, U.S.
- Died: December 25, 1982 (aged 88); New York City, U.S.
- Resting place: Mount Hebron Cemetery
- Occupations: Actor; Vaudevillian
- Years active: 1932–1952
- Spouse: Winnie Desbrought

Jack Pearl (born Jack Perlman; October 29, 1894 – December 25, 1982) was an American vaudeville performer and a star of early radio. He was best known for his character Baron Munchausen.

== Vaudeville and early films ==
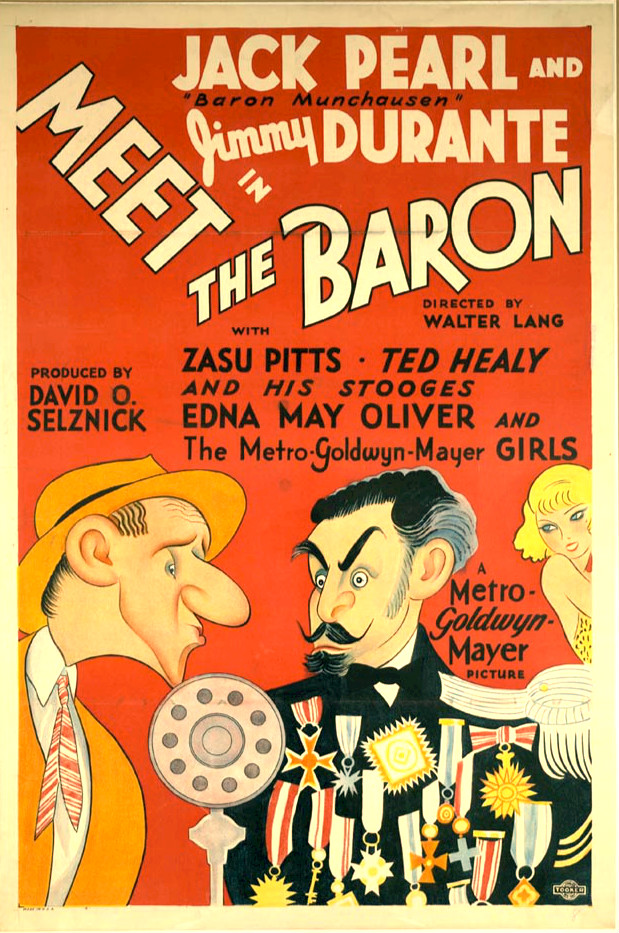
Poster for Meet the Baron (1933)

Born in the Lower East Side part of Manhattan, New York, Pearl debuted as an entertainer in School Days, Gus Edwards's vaudeville act.

He made the transition from vaudeville to broadcasting when he introduced his character Baron Munchausen on The Ziegfeld Follies of the Air in 1932. His creation was loosely based on the Baron Munchausen literary character. As the Baron, Pearl would tell far-fetched stories with a comic German accent. When the straight man (originally Ben Bard, but later Cliff Hall) expressed skepticism, the Baron replied with his familiar tagline and punchline: "Vass you dere, Sharlie?" ("Was you there, Charlie?"). This catch phrase soon became part of the national lexicon.

Typical of the dialogue:

Hall: You seem to be effervescent tonight.
Munchausen: Haff you effer seen me ven I effer vasn't?

Pearl played this character and others in Broadway musical revues of the 1920s and 1930s: The Dancing Girl (1923), Topics of 1923 (1923–1924), A Night in Paris (1926), Artists and Models (1927–1928), Pleasure Bound (1929), International Review (1930), Ziegfeld Follies of 1931, Pardon My English (1933) and All for All (1943).

In 1923, Pearl and Wilkie Bard appeared in early tests of the Lee DeForest sound-on-film process Phonofilm which are now in the UCLA Film and Television Archive.

== Radio ==
Pearl's radio career included stints as the host of The Lucky Strike Hour (1932–34) and The Jack Pearl Show, which ran from late 1936 through early 1937, sponsored by Raleigh and Kool Cigarettes.

The success of his first radio series brought him to the attention of Metro-Goldwyn-Mayer. He starred as his character in one feature film, Meet the Baron (1933) with Jimmy Durante, Edna May Oliver, ZaSu Pitts and the Three Stooges. He also appears in Ben Bard and Jack Pearl (1926), a film of their vaudeville act made in the DeForest Phonofilm sound-on-film process, and Hollywood Party (1934).

With the cancellation of his second radio series, Pearl found himself struggling to find work. He continued in radio with shows like, Jack and Cliff (1948), The Pet Milk Show (1950), and The Baron and the Bee (1952), a quiz show, but he never recaptured his mid-1930s fame.

In 1934, a juvenile novel, Jack Pearl as Detective Baron Munchausen, was based on his radio scripts. On February 8, 1960, he received a star at 1680 Vine Street on the Hollywood Walk of Fame for his radio work. Pearl died in New York in 1982.

He was an uncle to the agent and producer Bernie Brillstein.

== Personal life ==
Pearl was married to Winifred Desborough. He lived in the Upper East Side and died at Doctors Hospital in Yorkville, Manhattan.

== Filmography ==
Year	Title	Role	Notes
1927	Two Flaming Youths	Pearl	
1933	Meet the Baron	The Famous Baron Munchausen of the Air	
1934	Hollywood Party	Baron Munchausen	
