= Wilkie Bard =

British music hall entertainer (1874–1944)

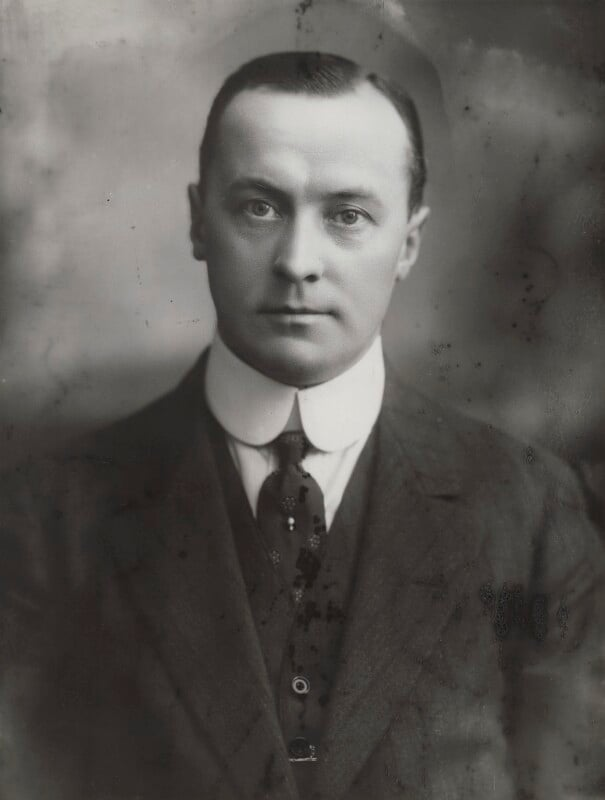
- Bard in 1910

Background information
- Born: William August Smith; 19 March 1874; Chorlton-cum-Hardy, Manchester, England
- Died: 5 May 1944 (aged 70) Buckinghamshire, England
- Genres: Vaudeville, music hall

Wilkie Bard (born William August Smith; 19 March 1874 – 5 May 1944) was a popular British vaudeville and music hall entertainer and recording artist at the beginning of the 20th century. He is best known for his songs "I Want to Sing in Opera" and "The Night Watchman".

== Early life ==
Bard was born in Chorlton-cum-Hardy, Manchester, Lancashire. He began as an amateur singer and comedian, aged 21, and his acts included the part of a coon singer and a character who had a bald head and who wore a black spot on each eyebrow. He also performed in female character roles, specifically with his hit song "I Want to Sing in Opera". Bard had a long career in pantomime and introduced tongue twisters such as "She sells seashells by the seashore", based on a song he performed in the show "Dick Whittington and His Cat" in Drury Lane in 1908. In 1919 he went to America where he performed in vaudeville, making his debut at the Palace Theatre on 20 October that year; the show was not well received. He stayed with the production and after a few alterations to the script, he became a hit.

He performed in Australia in 1921. In 1923, Bard appeared with Jack Pearl in tests for Lee de Forest's sound-on-film process Phonofilm. This short film is in the collection of the UCLA Film and Television Archive. In 1928, Bard appeared in two short films made in Phonofilm, The Cleaner and The Night Watchman, which may be in the collection of the British Film Institute.

== Personal life ==
Bard was married to Ellen Smith (née Stratton), who performed using the stage name Nellie Stratton. The 1881 and 1891 UK census returns show her name to be Nellie from birth (Peckham, London 1875).

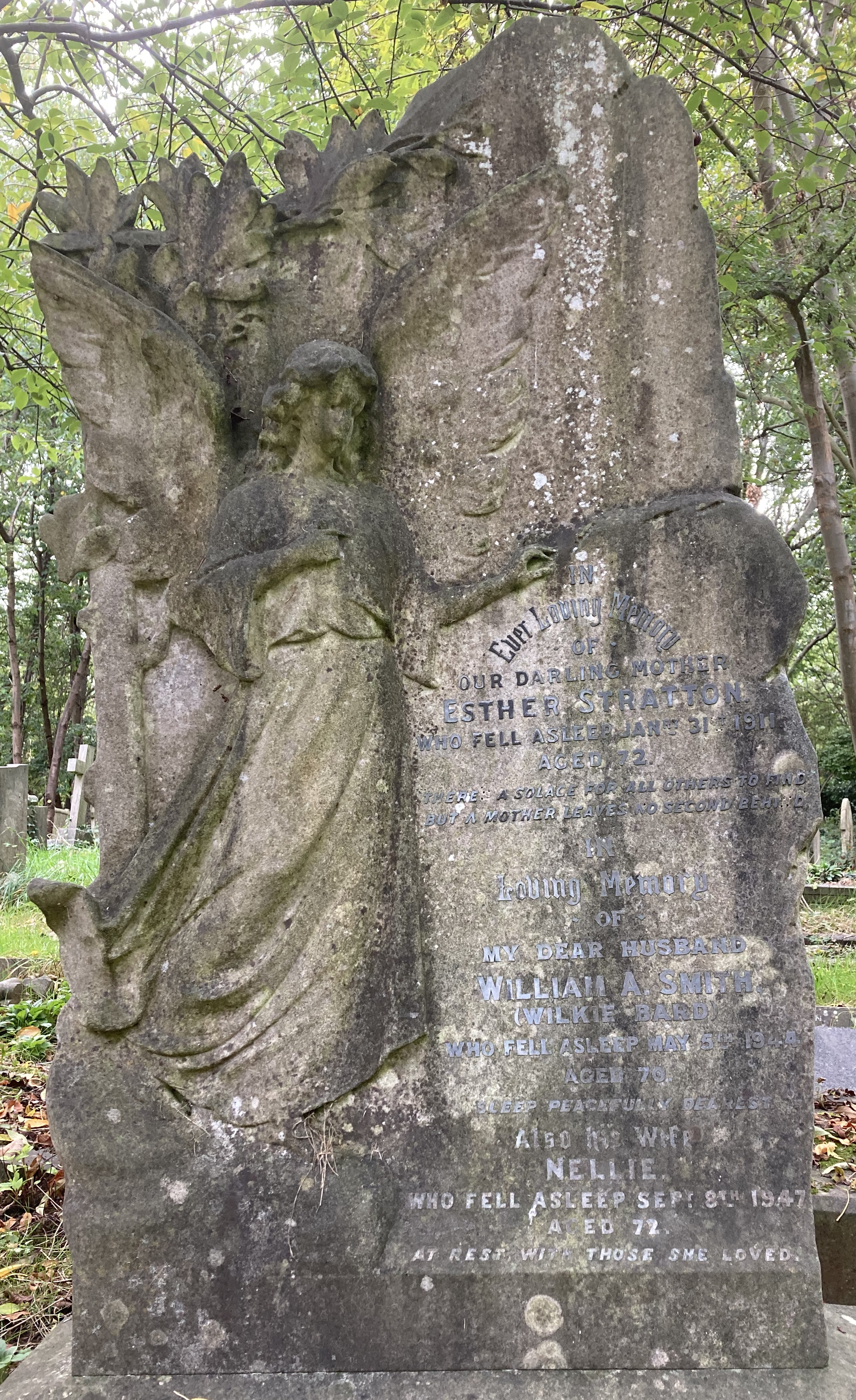
Grave of Wilkie Bard in Highgate Cemetery

== Death ==
Bard died in 1944 at the age of 70 in Buckinghamshire following a coronary thrombosis and was buried on the eastern side of Highgate Cemetery, on the main north/south path.
