= Otakar Mařák =

Czech opera singer (1872–1939)

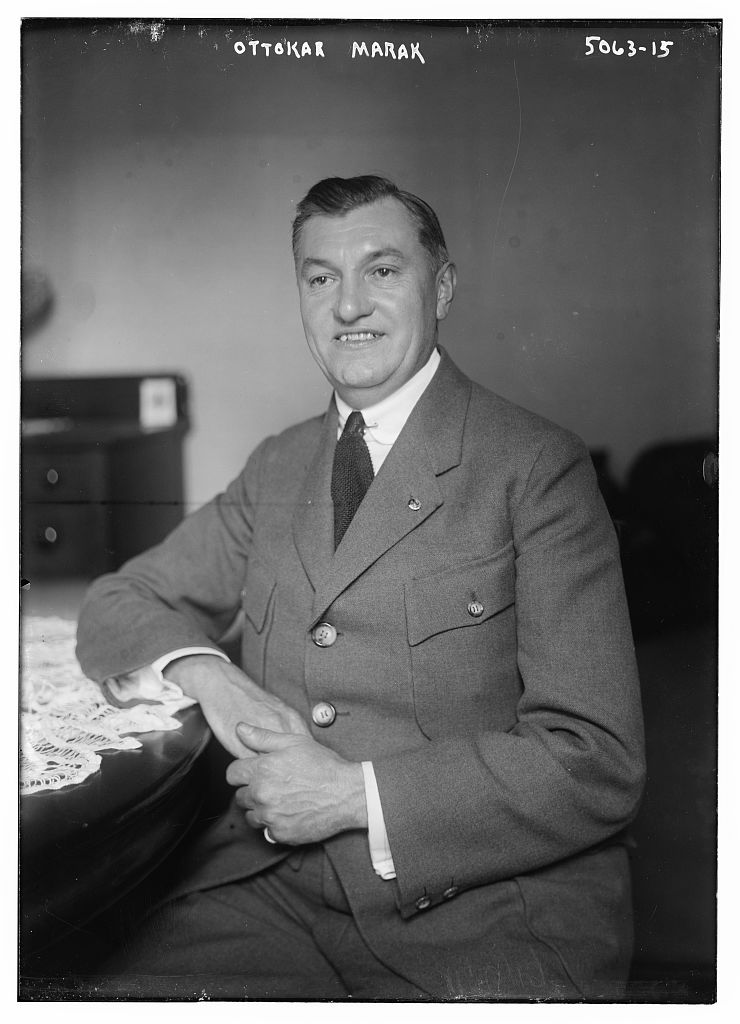
- Mařák c. 1919

Background information
- Born: 5 January 1872; Esztergom, Austria-Hungary
- Died: 2 July 1939 (aged 67) Prague, Protectorate of Bohemia and Moravia
- Genres: Opera
- Occupation: Singer (tenor)
- Years active: 1899–1934

Otakar Mařák (5 January 1872 – 2 July 1939) was a Czech opera singer and tenor.

== Biography ==
He was born on 5 January 1872 in Esztergom, Austria-Hungary (present-day Hungary). Mařák was a nephew of Julius Mařák.

In Prague Mařák studied at the School of Applied Arts and the Academy of Fine Arts. Mařák was also a student of Olga Paršová. Mařák made his debut in the title role of Charles Gounod's opera Faust on 1 February 1899 in Brno, Czech Republic. In the same year he was engaged by the National Theatre in Prague. From 1901, he performed abroad. He was a regular member of the National Theatre between 1899–1901 and again in 1903–1907. Thereafter he sang on this first Czech stage as a permanent guest. In 1907 he left for Paris, where he continued to school his voice then in 1908–1918 performed at London's Covent Garden and Berlin's Komische Oper.

Following World War I, Mařák became an American citizen and went on to teach in the country between 1934–1937. A brain seizure in 1937 forced his to return to Prague where he died two years later.

He especially excelled in Smetana parts such as Jeník in The Bartered Bride, Dalibor, Ladislav Podhajský in The Two Widows, Lucas in The Kiss as well as in traditional world repertory which saw Mařák play Don Ottavio in Don Giovanni, Massenet's Werther, Cavaradossi in Tosca and Alfred Germont in La Traviata. He often took on the role of Don José in Bizet's Carmen.

He died on 2 July 1939 in Prague.

Otakar Mařák left a lot of records. The first were issued by Apollo-Walzen (Berlin 1901), Columbia Cylinders (Prague 1902-03) and Edison Cylinders (Prague 1904), then followed discs for G&T (1903-07), Columbia (Prague 1905), Gramophone (Prague and Berlin 1908-12), Odeon (Berlin 1908-09, here a.o. Canio in complete "Pagliacci"), Pathé (Berlin 1913), Columbia (New York 1919-20), Artiphon (Prague 1923), Columbia (New York 1926 and Vienna 1929), Parlophon (Prague 1929) and Ultraphon (Prague 1933).

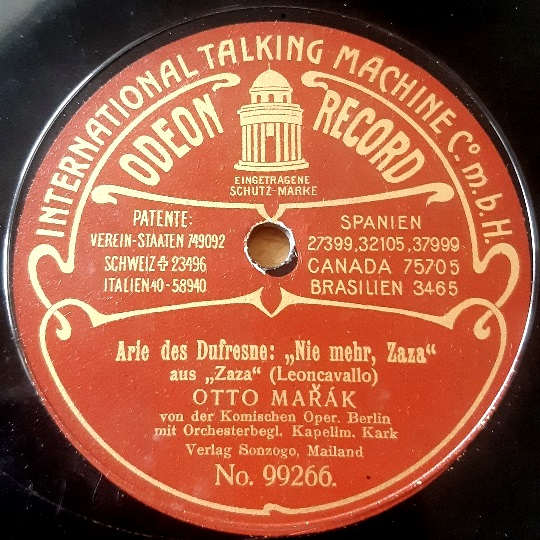
Record of Otakar Mařák (Berlin 1908)

== Legacy ==
Together with Emmy Destinn and Karel Burian, Mařák completed the trio of well-known early 20th century Czech singers.
