= Meet the Baron =

1933 film by Walter Lang

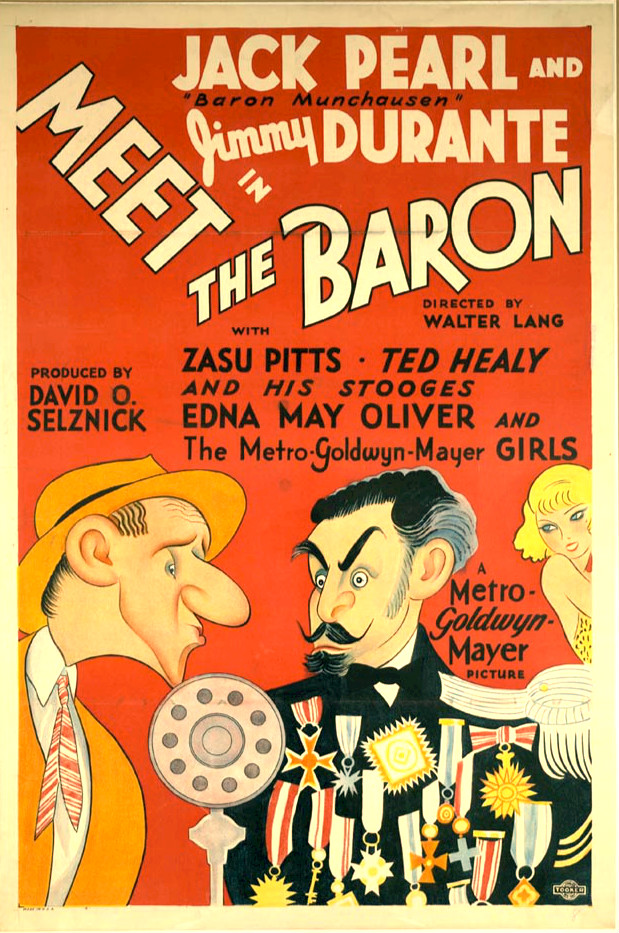
- Theatrical release poster
- Directed by: Walter Lang
- Written by: Norman Krasna; Herman J. Mankiewicz
- Produced by: David O. Selznick
- Starring: Jack Pearl; Jimmy Durante; Edna May Oliver; ZaSu Pitts; Ted Healy; Moe Howard; Larry Fine; Curly Howard
- Cinematography: Allen G. Siegler
- Edited by: James E. Newcom
- Production company: Metro-Goldwyn-Mayer
- Distributed by: Loew's, Inc.
- Release date: October 20, 1933
- Running time: 68 minutes
- Country: United States
- Language: English

Meet the Baron is a 1933 American pre-Code comedy film starring Jack Pearl, Jimmy Durante, Edna May Oliver, ZaSu Pitts, Ted Healy and His Stooges (Moe Howard, Larry Fine and Curly Howard). The film's title refers to Pearl's character of Baron Munchhausen, which he made famous on his radio show.

== Plot ==
Baron Munchausen has abandoned a couple of bunglers in the jungles of Africa. A rescue team mistakes Pearl for the missing Baron and takes the two of them back to America, where they receive a hero's welcome.

The phony Baron is invited to speak at Cuddle College, run by Dean Primrose. There, he falls for ZaSu Pitts, meets three crazy janitors, and faces exposure as a fraud.

== Cast ==
- Jack Pearl as The Famous Baron Munchausen of the Air
- Jimmy Durante as Joe McGoo – the Favorite "Schnozzle" of the Screen
- ZaSu Pitts as Zasu, Upstairs Maid
- Ted Healy as Head Janitor
- Edna May Oliver as Dean Primrose
- The Metro-Goldwyn-Mayer Girls as Dancers
- Henry Kolker as Baron Munchausen
- William B. Davidson as General Broadcasting Representative
- Moe Howard as Janitor
- Larry Fine as Janitor
- Jerry Howard as Janitor
- Ben Bard as Charley Montague
- Claude King as Explorer

== Reception ==
The film was a box-office disappointment for MGM.

"Clean as a Whistle," a musical number risqué for its time, which involves a group of women in a shower, was later featured in the 1994 MGM retrospective That's Entertainment! III as an example of Pre-Code Hollywood.

== See also ==
- The Three Stooges filmography
