= Louis Wolheim =

American character actor (1880–1931)

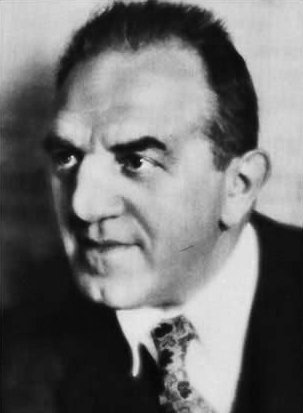
- Wolheim, 1930
- Born: Louis Robert Wolheim; March 28, 1880; New York City, U.S.
- Died: February 18, 1931 (aged 50); Los Angeles, California, U.S.
- Resting place: Hollywood Forever Cemetery
- Occupation: Actor
- Years active: 1914–1931
- Spouse: Ethel Dane (m. 1923)

Louis Robert Wolheim (March 28, 1880 – February 18, 1931) was an American actor, of both stage and screen, whose rough physical appearance relegated him to roles mostly of thugs, villains and occasionally a soldier with a heart of gold in the movies, but whose talent allowed him to flourish on stage. Most of his acting career took place during the silent era of the film industry. He appeared in a few sound films before his death at the age of 50 in 1931.

== Early life ==
Born in New York City in 1880, he attended Cornell University, where he graduated with a degree in engineering. After graduation, he taught mathematics, including six years as an instructor at Cornell. He also worked as a mining engineer. According to Wolheim, while at Cornell, he suffered an injury to his nose during a football game, and, after having the nose seen to by medical professionals, later that same day he got into a physical altercation (which he won), although his nose suffered more damage, ending up becoming almost a trademark for him. After the United States entrance into World War I, Wolheim joined the United States Army, and was in officers training at Camp Zachary Taylor in Louisville, Kentucky, when hostilities ended. Not wanting to remain in the service as a career, he asked for and was granted a discharge.

According to Art Leibson's book Sam Dreben: The Fighting Jew (Westernlore Press, Tucson, Arizona 1996), just before World War I Wolheim was in Chihuahua, Mexico selling raincoats and rubber boots to revolutionaries, when he met Sam Dreben, an American mercenary. According to a 1933 article in Liberty Magazine by Tex O'Reilly, Wolheim and Dreben were noted for their drinking and fighting in Mexican cantinas. One time Wolheim beat up a Mexican officer and was put in jail. Dreben rushed to the prison and secured Wolheim's release. When Dreben died in 1925 on the West Coast, Wolheim was living there and served as one of his pallbearers.

== Career ==
In 1914, on the advice of Lionel Barrymore and John Barrymore, Wolheim entered films. Both brothers also invited him to appear in the 1919 play The Jest in which the Barrymores co-starred. He would appear in at least five films with Lionel Barrymore including a serial and four films with John Barrymore, The Test of Honor (1919), Dr Jekyll & Mr Hyde (1920), Sherlock Holmes (1922) and Tempest (1928). Wolheim appeared in two silent films with their sister Ethel Barrymore. Wolheim's fearsome visage almost immediately typecast him in roles as gangsters, executioners (as in D. W. Griffith's Orphans of the Storm) or prisoners. Towards the end of the 1920s, he occasionally broke out of these stereotypes and played a comic Russian officer in Tempest and a rambunctious Sergeant in Howard Hughes's Two Arabian Knights. He also played a Chaneyesque gangster in Hughes's splendidly photographed The Racket, a lost film for over 70 years recently rediscovered.

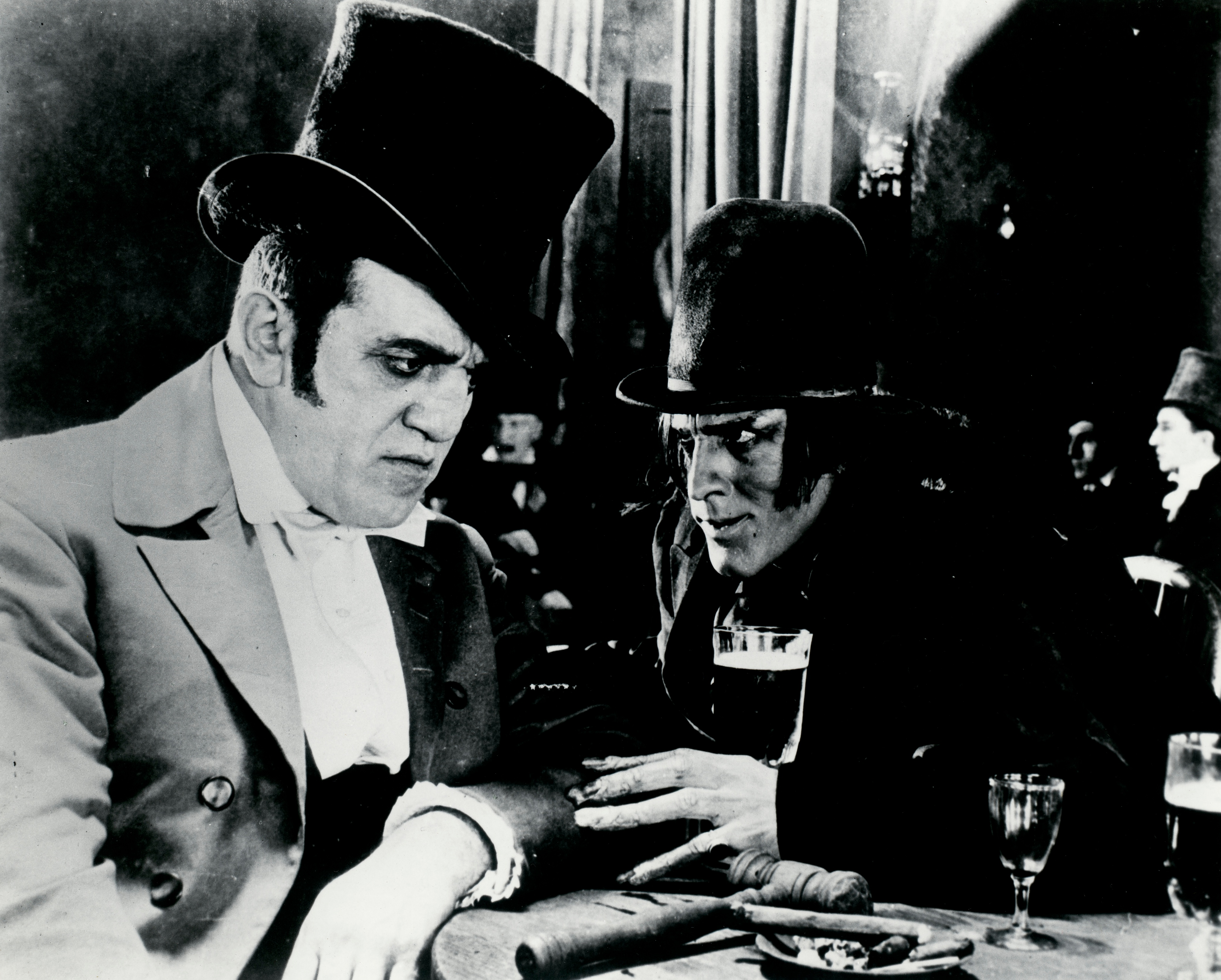
Wolheim as a saloon owner with John Barrymore as Mr. Hyde in Dr. Jekyll and Mr. Hyde (1920)

Beginning with his appearance in the Barrymores' play The Jest, Wolheim would appear in ten Broadway plays from 1919 through 1925. He received considerable acclaim as Yank in the original stage production of The Hairy Ape (1922) by Eugene O'Neill. His final play would be as the lead, Captain Flagg, in What Price Glory?, in 1925. The play would be made into a film a year later, with Victor McLaglen in the role of Flagg. In 1922, with his fluent French, Wolheim translated Henri Bernstein's play The Claw into English, which his friend Lionel Barrymore had a successful run on Broadway in.

Wolheim acted primarily in silent films, because of his sudden death at the close of the silent era, but he did appear in several talkies, including All Quiet on the Western Front and Danger Lights (both 1930) before he died. Wolheim was credited for a screenplay in addition to his acting career, for The Greatest Power, which starred none other than Ethel Barrymore. At the very end of his career, his final appearance was in The Sin Ship, which was also his only directing credit. The film was released in April 1931, after Wolheim's death, however after its completion, Wolheim had decided that directing was not for him, and had stated he would only act from that point forward.

According to the biography included in the DVD version of All Quiet on the Western Front, Wolheim wanted, at one point in his career, to play romantic leads instead of tough "heavies". To that end, he sought to have plastic surgery performed on his broken nose. Executives at United Artists successfully obtained a restraining order against him from doing so, however.

Off-screen, Wolheim had a reputation as a genuinely caring individual, so much so that after his death, when flowers were usually sent to the funeral, his friends and co-workers instead took up a collection and gave the money, in Wolheim's name, to a fund to feed the hungry. James R. Quirk, editor and president of Photoplay Magazine, said of Wolheim, "This is no attempt to glorify an actor who has passed on. It is the truth, every word of it. Louis Wolheim was one of the finest and most generous souls I have ever known." Wolheim was a member of The Lambs Club, which he had joined in 1925.

== Death ==
While preparing to appear in the film The Front Page, Wolheim died suddenly on February 18, 1931, in Los Angeles. He had been losing drastic amounts of weight for the role, and news accounts from that time attributed his death to that weight loss. However, modern sources attribute his death to stomach cancer. He was replaced in The Front Page's cast by Adolphe Menjou.

== Filmography ==
(filmography as per AFI database, except where otherwise noted)

- The Warning (1914) - Policeman (uncredited)
- The Romance of Elaine (1915, Serial) - (uncredited)
- Dorian's Divorce (1916) - Capt. Ross
- The Brand of Cowardice (1916) - Cpl. Mallin
- The Sunbeam (1916) - Biff the Brute
- The Greatest Power (1917, screenplay)
- The End of the Tour (1917)
- The Millionaire's Double (1917) - Bob Holloway
- The Eternal Mother (1917) - Bucky McGhee
- The Avenging Trail (1917) - Lefty Reed
- The Eyes of Mystery (1918) - Brad Tilton
- The House of Hate (1918 - film serial)
- Peg of the Pirates (1918) - Flatnose Tim (as L. Walheim)
- A Pair of Cupids (1918) aka. Both Members (reissue title) - Dirk Thomas
- The Poor Rich Man (1918) - Wrestler
- The Belle of the Season (1919) - Johnson
- The Carter Case (1919 - film serial) - Emanon
- The Test of Honor (1919) - Man/Devil in Dream(*uncredited)
- The Darkest Hour (1919) - Louis Marcotte
- Dr. Jekyll and Mr. Hyde (1920) - Dance Hall Proprietor
- A Manhattan Knight (1920) - Mangus O'Shea
- Number 17 (1921)
- Experience (1921) - Crime
- Orphans of the Storm (1921) - Executioner
- Determination (1922)
- Sherlock Holmes (1922) - Craigin
- The Face in the Fog (1922) - Petrus
- Love's Old Sweet Song (1923) - The Wanderer — two-reeler filmed in Phonofilm sound-on-film system
- The Last Moment (1923) - The Finn
- The Go-Getter (1923) - Daniel Silver
- Little Old New York (1923) - The Hoboken Terror
- Unseeing Eyes (1923) - Laird
- The Uninvited Guest (1924) - Jan Boomer
- America (1924) - Capt. Hare
- The Story Without a Name (1924) - Kurder
- Lover's Island (1925) - Captain Joshua Dawson
- Two Arabian Knights (1927) - Sergeant Peter McGaffney
- Sorrell and Son (1927) - Buck
- Tempest (1928) - Sgt. Bulba
- The Racket (1928) - Nick Scarsi
- The Awakening (1928) - Le Bete
- The Shady Lady (1929) - Professor Holbrook
- Square Shoulders (1929) - Slag Collins
- Wolf Song (1929) - Gullion
- Frozen Justice (1929) - Duke
- Condemned (1929) - Jacques
- The Ship from Shanghai (1930) - Ted, the steward
- All Quiet on the Western Front (1930) - Stanislaus Katczinsky
- Danger Lights (1930) - Dan Thorn
- The Silver Horde (1930) - George Balt
- Gentleman's Fate (1931) - Frank
- The Sin Ship (1931) - Captain Sam McVey (also directed)

== Stage career ==
(list as per Internet Broadway Database)

- The Jest (1919–20) - The Executioner
- The Letter of the Law (1920) - Bridet
- The Broken Wing (1920–1921) - General Panfilo Aguilar
- The Claw (1921–1922) - translation from French
- The Fair Circassian (1921) - The Prince Regent
- The Idle Inn (1921–1922) - Bendet
- The Hairy Ape (1922) - Yank
- MacBeth (1924) - Porter
- Catskill Dutch (1924) - Cobby
- What Price Glory? (1925) - Captain Flagg
