= Radium, and Other Radioactive Substances =

Book by William Joseph Hammer

Radium, and Other Radio-active Substances; Polonium, Actinium, and Thorium
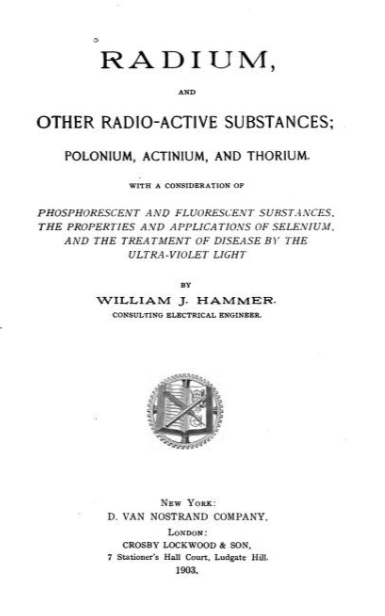
- Title page for Radium, and Other Radio-active Substances; Polonium, Actinium, and Thorium (1903)
- Author: William Joseph Hammer
- Language: English
- Subject: Radium
- Publisher: Van Nostrand Company
- Publication date: 1903
- Publication place: United States
- Pages: 72

Radium, and Other Radio-active Substances; Polonium, Actinium, and Thorium is a book published in 1903 by William Joseph Hammer, when he was about 50 years old. The book is the text of a lecture delivered at a meeting of the American Institute of Electrical Engineers. The title of the lecture was "Radium and other radioactive substances with a consideration of phosphorescent and fluorescent substances. The properties and applications of selenium and the treatment of disease by the ultra violet light". The lecture was augmented by 38 lantern slides, which are reproduced in the book.

== Subjects ==
=== Radioactivity ===
In addition to the matters implied by the title of the lecture (radium, polonium, actinium and thorium), Hammer discusses:

- The work of Pierre and Marie Curie, Dewar, Roentgen, Henri Becquerel, Rutherford, J. J. Thomson and Kelvin
- Uranium
- Ores of various radioactive materials
- Alpha, beta, gamma and X-rays forms of radiation, including radiographs of mice made by the latter, and experiments into the lethal effects of X-rays and radioactive sources

=== Selenium ===
There are 21 pages devoted to "The properties and applications of selenium", including the use of its changing electrical resistance in different light levels. A quantitative measurement of an eclipse of the sun, by means of a selenium based sensor, is reported. Use of selenium in a "radiophone" devised by Alexander Graham Bell around 1883 is described. (Bell used the sound waves to be transmitted to vibrate a mirror. A beam of light bounced off the mirror onto a selenium object. The variation in the light falling on the sensor translated to a varying electrical signal which could be transmitted, then turned back into vibrations in the air.) Ernst Ruhmer's photographophone is described. It recorded sound similarly to a phonograph, but the sound waves were used, via a selenium cell, to vary the brightness of a beam falling on a moving strip of photographic film. Ruhmer is also credited with using a selenium cell to turn off the lights of maritime navigation buoys during daylight hours, thus conserving the gas they burned.

=== Light ===
The book concludes with nine pages concerning the work of Niels R Finsen of Copenhagen, who was treating various diseases with light. Hammer notes that for a time, "Finsen's work received little credence... but he persisted... to-day the world rings with his praises." It is claimed that by 1903, Finsen's work was approved of "In England by Queen Alexandra, and in Russia by her sister, the Czarina, they both investigating the system while visiting their father, the King of Denmark." There is even a claim that Finsen was able to spare smallpox victims from scarring by keeping them in a room with red glass windows while the disease went through certain stages.
