= Photoplayer =

Mechanical orchestra used in silent films

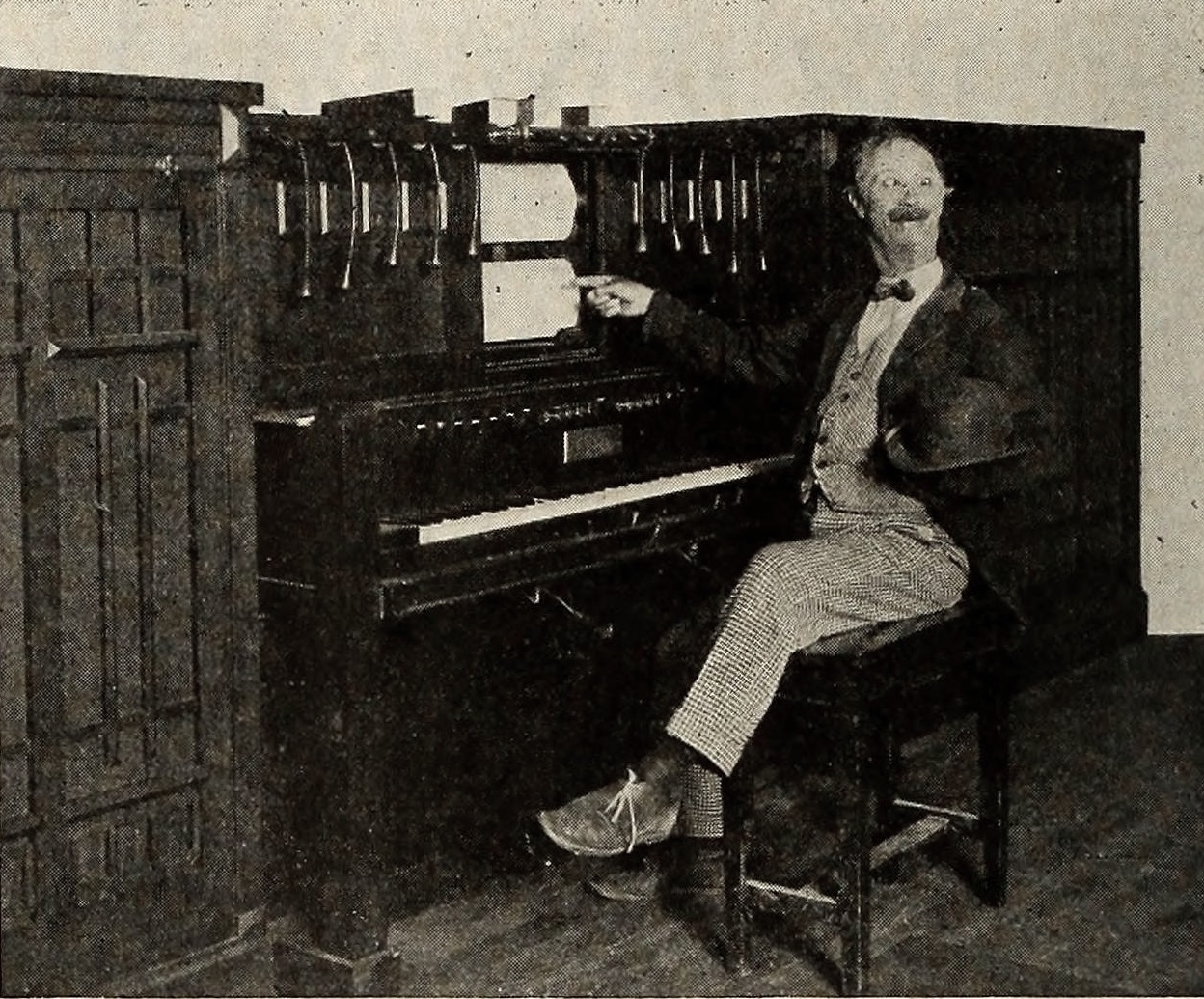
Ben Turpin and a type of photoplayer instrument, June–August 1922

The photoplayer is an automatic mechanical orchestra used by movie theatres to produce photoplay music to accompany silent films.

== Operation ==
The central instruments in a photoplayer were a piano and percussion; some machines also added pipe organs and methods for manually creating sound effects. Like a player piano, the photoplayer played music automatically by reading piano rolls (rolls of paper with perforations), but the photoplayer could hold two rolls: one that would play while the other was prepared. Common sound effects included gunshots, bells and drums, which were generated by pulling chains called "cow-tails". Some photoplayers feature electric sound effects, such as sirens, automobile horns, and other oddities. A photoplayer operator had to load the paper rolls, start the machine and add the manual sound effects and percussion using the cow-tails.

== History ==
Approximately 8,000 to 10,000 photoplayers were produced during the boom era of silent films, between 1910 and 1928. Around a dozen manufacturers produced the instruments, including the American Photo Player Company, which made the Fotoplayer; the Operators Piano Company of Chicago, which made the Reproduco; The Bartola Musical Instrument Company of Oshkosh, Wisconsin, maker of the Bartola; Seeburg; and Wurlitzer. The popularity of the photoplayer sharply declined in the mid-1920s as silent films were replaced by sound films, and few machines still exist today.

== See also ==
- Theatre organs: played by an organist, they could produce a wider range of sound and were popular in larger theatres
- American Fotoplayer, a type of photoplayer by the American Photo Player Co.
