= Joe Rinaudo =

American collector and musician

- Born: 1951 (age 74–75)
- Known for: Restoration of the American Fotoplayer
- Website: https://www.silentcinemasociety.org/

Joe Rinaudo (born 1951) is an American musician and conservator best known for playing and restoring the American Fotoplayer. He is also the founder of the Silent Cinema Society, which is dedicated to preservation and collection of silent films.

Rinaudo's interest in silent films began when he was a child, and he purchased and restored his first Fotoplayer in 1976. In 2006, he was featured on an episode of California's Gold, where he showcased his personal Fotoplayer. His performance on the show went viral on social media in 2012.

In 2015, Rinaudo donated his personal collection of films and cartoons to the Academy Film Archive.
