= William Joseph Hammer =

American engineer

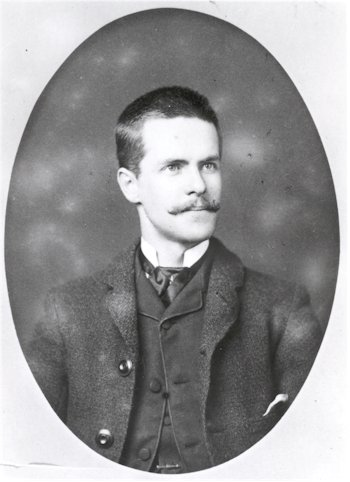
William Joseph Hammer in 1881

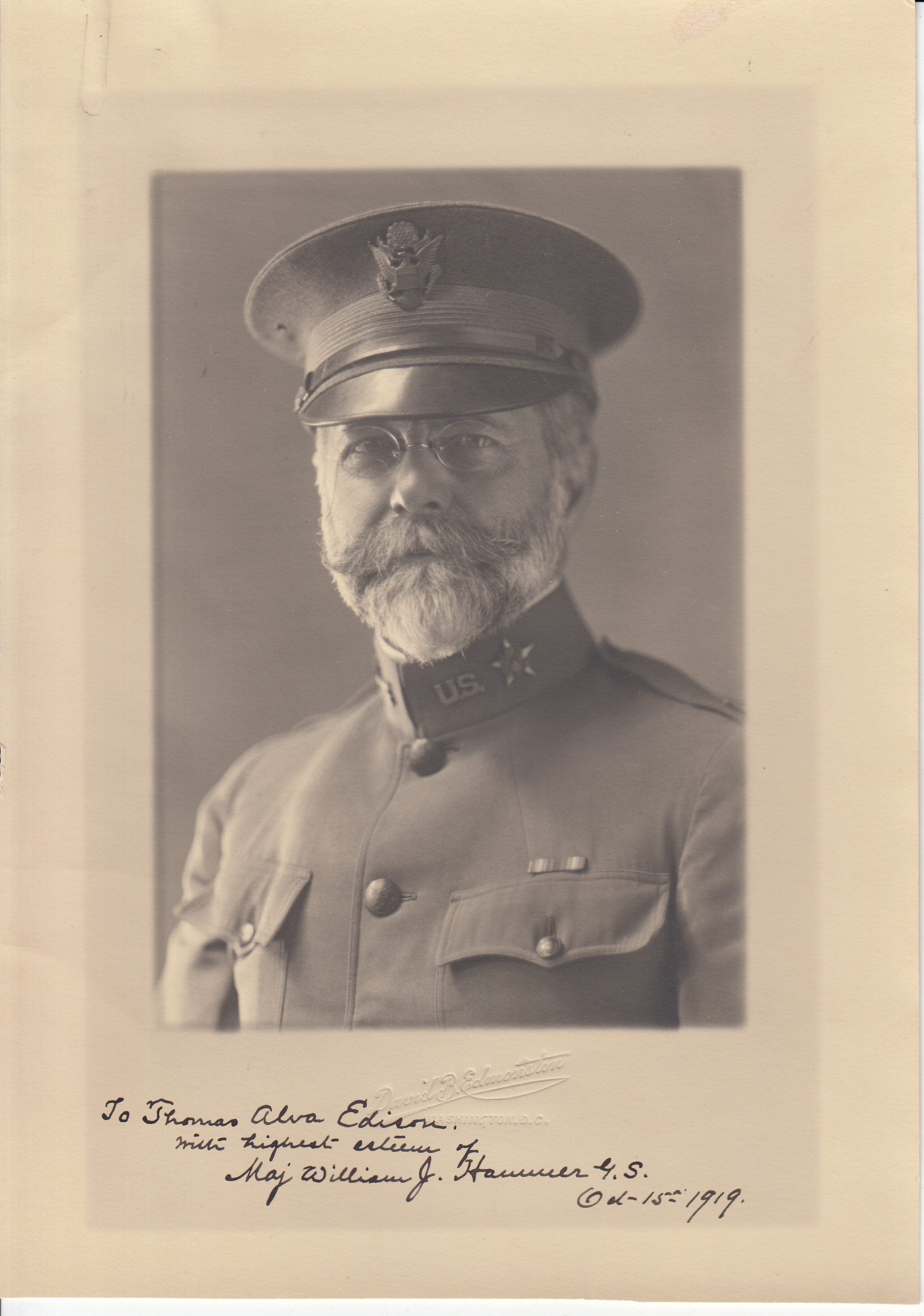
William Joseph Hammer in 1919

William Joseph Hammer (February 26, 1858 – March 24, 1934) was an American pioneer electrical engineer, aviator, and president of the Edison Pioneers.

== Biography ==
He was born in Cressona, Pennsylvania on February 26, 1858, to William Hammer (1827–1895) and Martha Augusta Beck (1827–1861).

He became a laboratory assistant to Thomas Edison in December 1879, and assisted in the development of the incandescent light bulb. He became one of the world's earliest experts in electric power distribution. He also built the world's first advertising sign using incandescent electric lights. He was chief engineer when the English Edison Electric Light company built a central station in London to power 3,000 incandescent lamps on the Holborn Viaduct. This was the first large scale demonstration of a central station powering incandescent lighting, preceding the Pearl Street Station in New York City. Hammer invented the electric advertising sign, by constructing a ten foot long, four foot high sign with 12 bulbs for each letter of the name "Edison," which had a rotating drum switch to light the letters one by one and then all at once. It was exhibited at The Crystal Palace in London in February 1882.

He collected examples of the Edison lamp at various stages of development, as well as pioneering incandescent lamps by other inventors. The collection eventually was purchased by General Electric placed in the Greenfield Village Museum, established by Henry Ford.

He was a promoter of radium, after Marie and Pierre Curie gave him samples in 1902. He gave lectures on its properties and discussed its purported curative powers, as well as writing a book based on his lectures and demonstrations of radium and luminous and phosphorescent substances. He was the first to propose Radium as a treatment for cancer. In 1903, he and Dr. Willy Meyer used radium to treat an incurable tumor, and it was observed to shrink and become less painful, though the patient was not cured. He invented the luminous Radium dial for watches and other instruments, widely used in World War 1 and thereafter.

Hammer was an early promoter of aviation, and an associate of many of the aviation pioneers, and testified as an expert.

He authored the book Radium, and other radioactive substances.

He died of pneumonia on March 24, 1934, in New York City. Whether or not his death had any connection with radium is to this day unclear.

== Discoveries ==
While working for the inventor Thomas Edison at Edison's laboratory in Menlo Park, New Jersey, Hammer was in charge of testing early electric light globes in 1880 through 1881. In 1881, he made an accidental discovery that turned out to be of great importance.

At the time, Edison was attempting to produce a reliable and commercial electric light bulb. The essence of his idea was that a filament would glow within a glass envelope from which the air had been evacuated when electrically energized with direct current (DC). The exclusion of air was essential to maximize the life of the filament. Edison had chosen a carbonized (burned) bamboo filament for his new lamp, but this solution was not perfect. After being heated to incandescence for a few hours, carbon from the filament would be deposited on the inside walls of the bulb, turning it black.

Hammer noticed the carbon seemed to be coming from the end of the filament that was attached to the negative terminal of the DC power supply, and seemed to be flying through the vacuum onto the walls of the bulb, a phenomenon that Edison observed in 1875. On February 13, 1880, Edison determined that not only was carbon flying through the vacuum, but that it carried a charge. That is, electricity was flowing not only through the filament but also through the evacuated bulb, a phenomenon initially reported in 1873 by Frederick Guthrie in Britain. In order to measure this flow, he made a special bulb with a third electrode, to which he could attach an instrument to measure the current. He reasoned that if the current would flow between the two ends of the filament, it would also flow to this third electrode. While he was proven to be right about the current flow, Edison could not explain it, and the third electrode did not prevent blackening of the bulb, so he moved on to other experiments. But he did patent the new device, because he believed that it might have some commercial applications, such as measuring electric current.

Hammer found that under certain conditions of vacuum and voltage he observed a blue glow around the positive pole in a vacuum bulb and a blackening of the wire and the inside of the glass bulb at the positive pole. Hammer's discovery was first called "Hammer's Phantom Shadow," but when Edison patented the electric light bulb in 1883 this thermionic emission became known as the "Edison Effect," and was patented on November 15, 1883 (U.S. patent 307,031).

When the bulb's filament is heated white-hot, electrons are boiled off its surface and into the vacuum inside the bulb. If the extra electrode (also called a "plate" or "anode") is made more positive than the hot filament, a direct current flows through the vacuum. And since the extra electrode is cold and the filament is hot, this current can only flow from the filament to the electrode, not the other way. So, alternating current (AC) signals can be converted into DC, or rectified. Hammer noted the rectifier effect when he added the third electrode to a heated filament light bulb.

In September 1884, British scientist William Preece took back with him several of the Edison effect bulbs. He presented a paper on them in 1885, where he referred to thermionic emission as the "Edison Effect." The British physicist John Ambrose Fleming, who in 1882 had accepted a consulting position for the Edison & Swan Electric Light Company of London, discovered in 1885 that the Edison Effect could be used to detect radio waves. Fleming went on to develop the two-element vacuum tube known as the diode, which he patented on November 16, 1904. After further investigation while working for the Marconi Wireless Telegraph Co., Ltd., Fleming patented the Fleming Valve rectifier in 1904, resulting in the electron tube becoming the basis of modern electronics.

== In popular culture ==
Ruth Plumly Thompson, author of the "Oz books" after L. Frank Baum died, made some references to Hammer in a fantasy context. An electrical device in The Cowardly Lion of Oz (1923) is credited by its owner to an otherwise unexplained "Uncle Billy". A note on the title page of Grampa in Oz (1924) reads: "This book is dedicated, with deep affection, to Uncle Billy (Major William J. Hammer), author, inventor and second cousin to Santa Claus." A character in The Yellow Knight of Oz (1930) and Speedy in Oz (1934) is an eccentric inventor named William J. Harmsted.

== See also ==
- Radium, and Other Radioactive Substances
