= Ernst Ruhmer =

German physicist (1878–1913)

Ernst Walter Ruhmer (15 April 1878 – 8 April 1913) was a German physicist. He was best known for investigating practical applications making use of the light-sensitivity properties of selenium, which he employed in developing wireless telephony using line-of-sight optical transmissions, sound-on-film audio recording, and television transmissions over wires.

== Career ==
Ruhmer's father was an inventor and manufacturer. From 1897 to 1900 he studied mathematics and natural sciences in Berlin, and the next year continued his studies in Giessen. His early work included extensive research in developing selenium cells that were more sensitive, and faster reacting, to the effects of light illumination. In December 1902 he and Salomon Kalischer were issued German patent 151,971 for their method of producing photographic images by exposing electrically conductive selenium-coated plates. Ruhmer also designed a light-sensitive control switch, using a selenium cell, which was successfully used to automatically turn off the flow of a buoy's illuminating gas during daylight hours. In 1904 he established a private physics laboratory, located in southwest Berlin.

=== Wireless telephony ===
==== Photophone ====
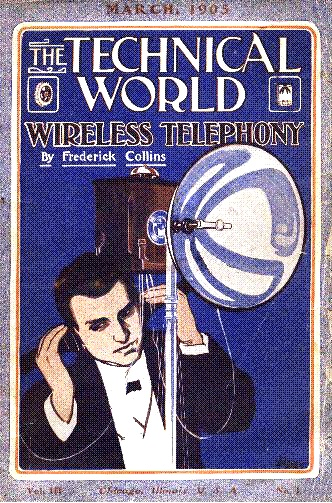
Ruhmer pictured listening to his "photo-electric" optical telephone system (1905)

Ruhmer first gained widespread recognition for his work on improvements to Alexander Graham Bell's optical wireless telephone, the photophone. Bell introduced this device in 1880, which used selenium cells in the receiver to convert the fluctuating light produced by the transmitting unit into sounds. But Bell's invention only had a range of a few hundred meters, and he soon ended his research into this device. Ruhmer believed that the increased sensitivity of his selenium cells, combined with the superior receiving capabilities of professor H. T. Simon's "speaking arc", would make the photophone practical over longer signalling distances.

Ruhmer carried out a series of experimental transmissions along the Havel river and on Lake Wannsee from 1901 to 1902. He reported achieving sending distances under good conditions of 15 kilometers (9 miles), with equal success during the day and at night, although the longest transmissions were dependent on having clear weather. He continued his experiments around Berlin through 1904, in conjunction with the German Navy, which supplied high-powered searchlights for use in the transmissions.

==== Radiotelephone ====
Ruhmer also carried out research in making audio transmissions using radio signals. In 1904, he was granted, along with Adolf Pieper, German patent 173,396, "A Process for Generating Permanently Undamped Electrical Oscillations", which described a method for creating "continuous wave" transmissions using a mercury-vapor vacuum-tube.

In 1904 he developed a high-speed alternator which produced transmitting frequencies of up to 120,000 cycles-per-second. However, this effort never got beyond a basic prototype that generated less than .001 watt.

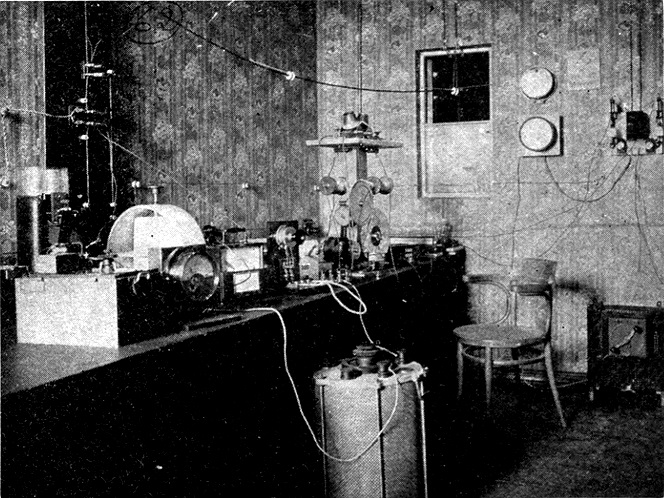
Ruhmer's radiotelephone transmitter, circa 1905

Ruhmer also investigated radiotelephone transmissions using a high-frequency spark transmitter. This work took place during winter 1904-5, however, this approach had limited results, as he later noted that "the transmitted speech received on microphonic contact and telephone was rough and broken like that of a stammerer".

In 1906, employing a design largely based on the hydrogen arc transmitter developed by Denmark's Valdemar Poulsen, he reported that he had constructed a transmitter capable of producing frequencies up to 300,000 cycles-per-second. Although the quality of the resulting audio transmissions were "strikingly good", and he felt that transmission range could be extended to several kilometers, these tests were only conducted over a distance of 500 meters.

Ruhmer also investigated carrier current transmissions (then commonly known as "wired wireless"), where multiple radio signals are transmitted along an electrical conductor, which acts as a wave guide carrying the signals to designated locations. In 1911, it was reported that during a recent demonstration, "four transmissions—German, French, song and gramophone music respectively—were effected simultaneously, but the number can obviously be increased considerably without any disturbance".

In 1907 Ruhmer wrote Drahtlose Telephonie, which was translated by James Erskine-Murray and published in 1908 as Wireless Telephony In Theory and Practice. This book reviewed the various technologies being investigated for wireless telephony, including both optical telephone research and the newer radiotelephone developments. Radio transmissions were soon recognized to be superior for most applications, as they were unaffected by weather, and were not limited to line-of-sight transmissions.

=== Sound-on-film recording ===
In 1900, as part of his optical wireless telephone research, Ruhmer recorded the fluctuations of the transmitting arc-light as varying shades of light and dark bands onto a continuous roll of photographic film. He then determined that he could reverse the process and reproduce the recorded sound from this photographic strip, by shining a bright light through the running filmstrip, with the resulting varying light illuminating a selenium cell. The changes in brightness caused a corresponding change in the selenium's resistance to electrical currents, which was used to modulate the sound produced in a telephone receiver. He summarized the results as: "It is truly a wonderful process: sound becomes electricity, becomes light, causes chemical actions, becomes light and electricity again, and finally sound." He called this invention the photographophone. The general concept would eventually be adopted for producing sound movies.

=== Television ===
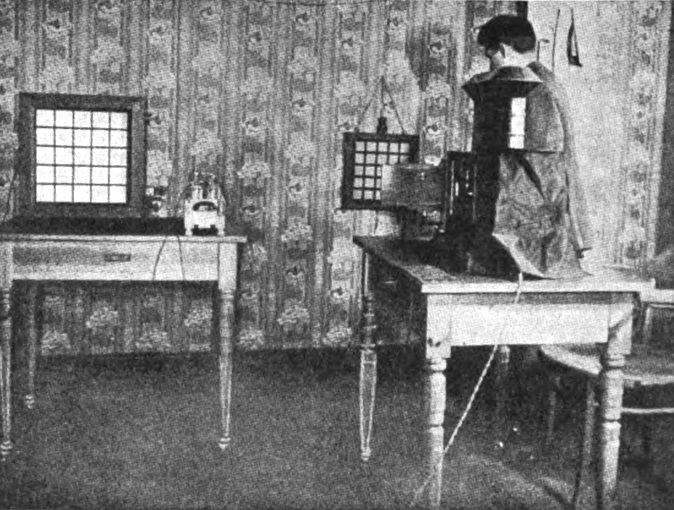
Ruhmer demonstrating his experimental television system, which was capable of transmitting images of simple shapes over telephone lines, using a 25-element selenium cell receiver (1909)

Ruhmer also researched using selenium cells as the picture elements for a television receiver. In late 1909 he successfully demonstrated in Belgium the transmission of simple images over a telephone wire from the Palace of Justice at Brussels to the city of Liege, a distance of 115 kilometers (72 miles). This demonstration was described at the time as "the world's first working model of television apparatus". However, his device consisted of only 25 cells, thus was only capable of representing simple geometric shapes. Ruhmer was confident that producing a system capable of higher definition images "was only a matter of money". However, at the cost of £15 (US$45) per selenium cell, he estimated that a 4,000 cell system would cost £60,000 (US$180,000), and a 10,000 cell mechanism capable of reproducing "a scene or event requiring the background of a landscape" would cost £150,000 (US$450,000). Because of the high cost, he didn't foresee his device as suitable for private home use, instead envisioning that central offices in major cities could be established, and customers would make arrangements to make use of the service.

Ruhmer expressed the hope that the 1910 Brussels Exposition Universelle et Internationale would sponsor the construction of an advanced device with significantly more cells, as a showcase for the exposition. However, the estimated expense of £250,000 (US$750,000) proved to be too high. Also, television research turned to using cathode ray tubes in receivers as a superior approach.

Ruhmer's promising career was eventually cut short. He fell ill in 1912, and died the next year at the age of 34.
