= American Fotoplayer =

Player piano with film sound effects

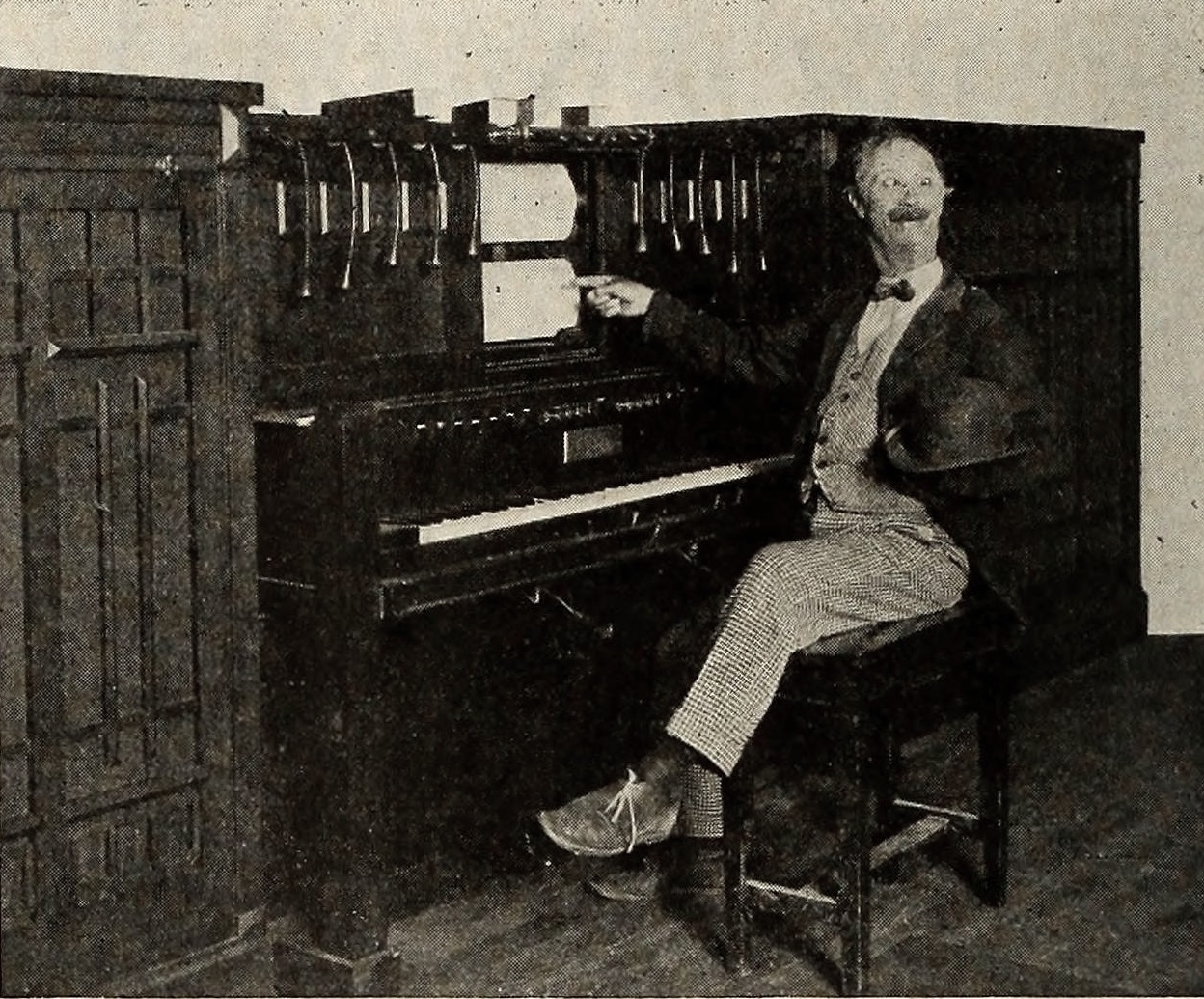
Ben Turpin with a Fotoplayer, 1922

The American Fotoplayer is a type of photoplayer developed by the American Photo Player Co. between the years of 1912 and 1925. The Fotoplayer is a type of player piano specifically developed to provide music and special sound effects for silent movies.

== History ==
Before movies had sound, it was discovered that playing background music during a film could aid in developing a particular mood for a certain scene. Initially, small theatres would use player pianos to produce music automatically from piano rolls. After some time, some of these pianos were extended in size with pipe organs and sound effects inserted into large cabinets connected to the sides of the piano. The user of this new contraption could then create multiple sounds to match the actions on screen. Between 8,000 and 12,000 of these musical instruments were made between 1910 and 1928, with the American Fotoplayer Company's Fotoplayer being one of the most popular brands.

When sound films were first created in the late 1920s, the Fotoplayer became unnecessary. The American Fotoplayer Company ceased production of their product in 1926.

== Operation ==
The appeal of the Fotoplayer to theatre owners was that it took no major musical skill to operate. The Fotoplayer would play the piano and pipe organ mechanically using an electric motor, an air pump, and piano rolls while the user of the Fotoplayer would follow the onscreen action while pulling cords, pushing buttons, and pressing pedals to produce relatable sounds to what was occurring onscreen. These actions could create sounds such as a steamboat whistle, a bird chirp, wind, thunder, a telephone bell, a drum, castanets, cymbal, tambourine, bass drum, klaxon, triangle, siren, horn, train whistle, as well as many others. On Fotoplayers specifically, most effects were created using leather cords, with wooden handles on the ends, directly connected to the effects. For example, the steamboat whistle sound effect was created using a household bellows with a whistle at the end. Pulling the cord compressed the bellows, delivering a gust of air into the whistle. Creating a drum roll on the other hand was a bit more complicated. A clockwork device was needed to time the strikes of the drum which required constant winding.

== Today ==
Of the thousands of American Fotoplayers made, fewer than fifty survive today, and of those only twelve are known to still be playable, many of which being restored/preserved by Joe Rinaudo.
