= Photographophone =

Device used to produce and play back audio recordings

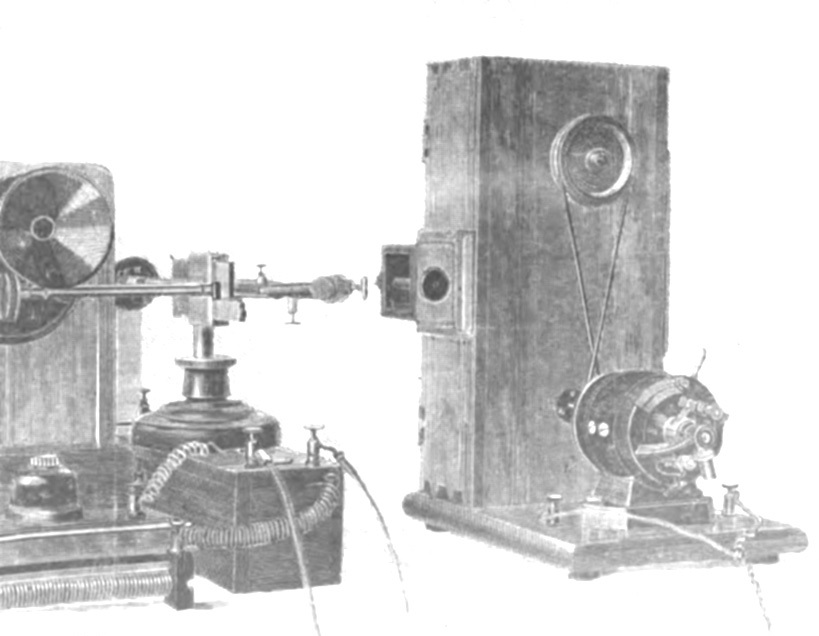
"The Photographophone" (1901)

A photographophone is a device, first developed by Ernst Ruhmer of Berlin, Germany in 1900, used to produce and play back audio recordings.

Photographophone recording uses celluloid film. The process is started by speaking into a microphone, connected to a battery pack, whose modulated electrical output produces corresponding variations in the light of an arc (later an incandescent lamp) that passes through a cylindrical lens slot, which creates lines on the moving sensitive film. This film, after being taken out of the box and developed, shows a series of perpendicular striations parallel to one another, which are a photographic record of the sound waves created by the telephone transmitter output.

To reproduce the recorded sound, a projector directs light through the film, which travels at an equal velocity to that with which the record is made. Behind the film, a sensitive selenium cell is mounted, receiving the variations in light, which produces a variation in its resistance, and corresponding audio in a connected telephone receiver.

Ruhmer was quoted as saying: "It is truly a wonderful process: sound becomes electricity, becomes light, causes chemical action, becomes light and electricity again, and finally sound." In addition, it was described as "The reproduction of speech by this photographic phonograph is astonishingly clear, and in strength resembles the ennunciation of a good telephone when in ordinary use... It has the advantage of the ordinary wax-cylindered phonographs in that the reproduction is purer and is free from the unpleasant noises caused by imperfections in the mechanism."
