= History of multitrack recording =

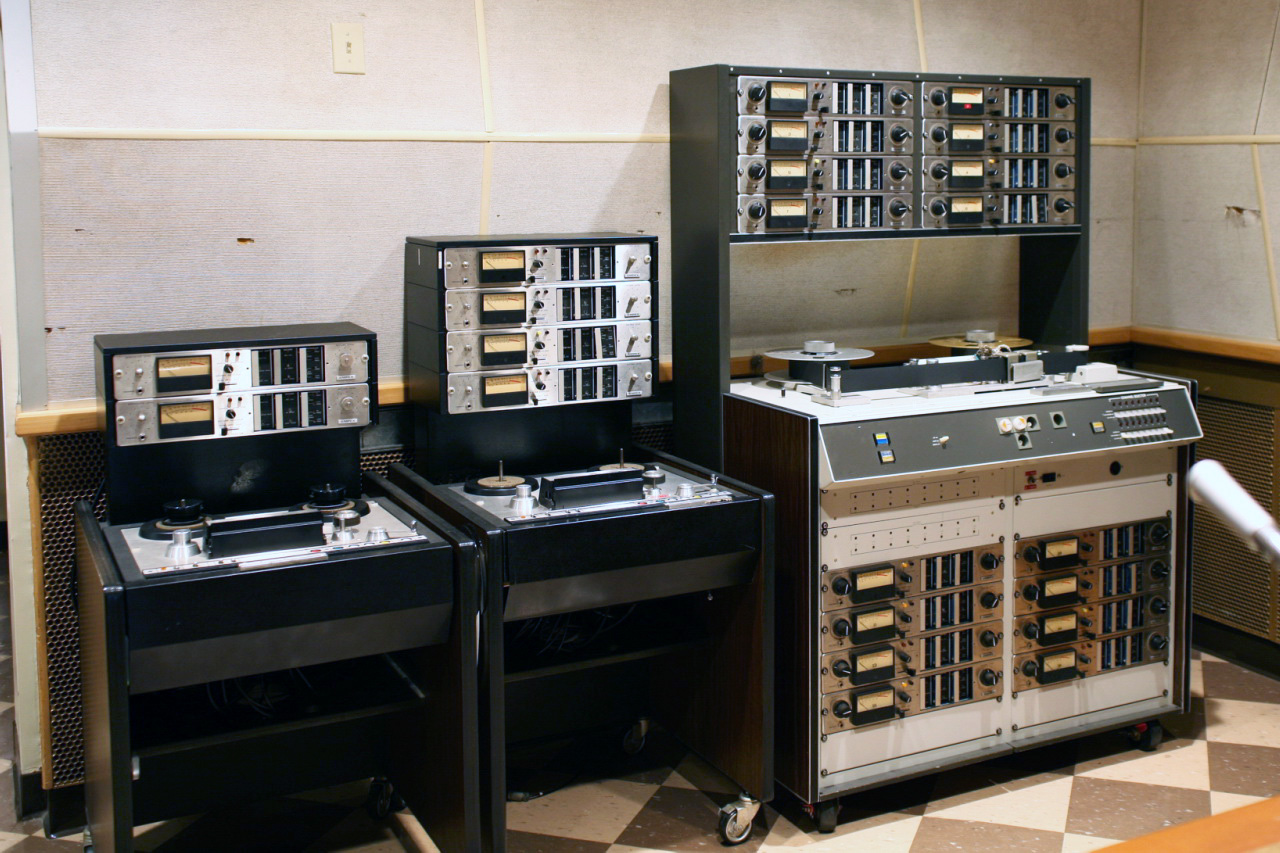
AMPEX 440 (two-track, four-track) and 16-track MM1000

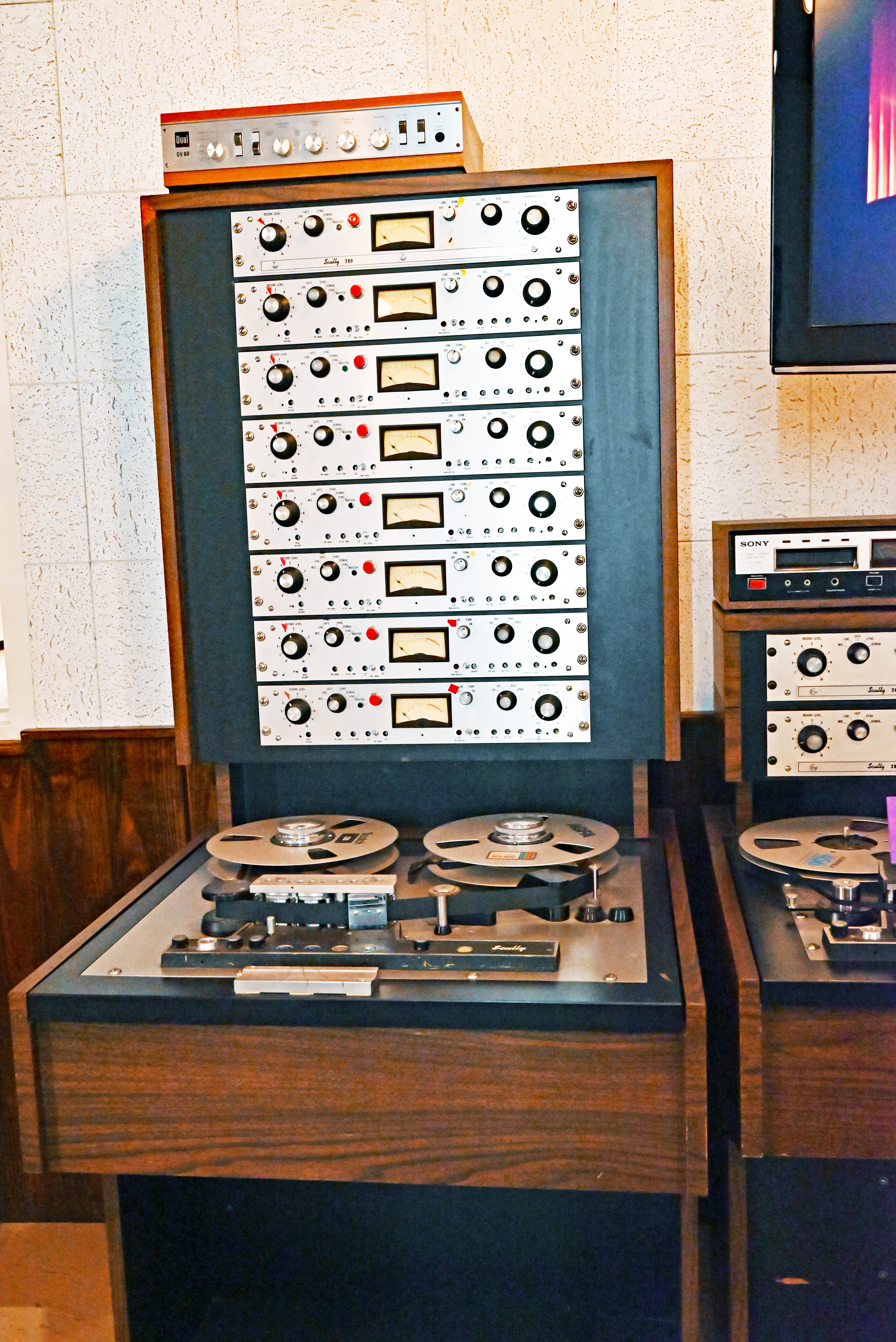
Scully 280 eight-track recorder using 1 inch (25 mm) tape at the Stax Museum of American Soul Music

Multitrack recording of sound is the process in which sound and other electro-acoustic signals are captured on a recording medium such as magnetic tape, which is divided into two or more audio tracks that run parallel with each other. Because they are carried on the same medium, the tracks stay in perfect synchronization, while allowing multiple sound sources to be recorded at different times.

The first system for creating stereophonic sound (using telephone technology) was demonstrated by Clément Ader in Paris in 1881. The pallophotophone, invented by Charles A. Hoxie and first demonstrated in 1922, recorded optically on 35 mm film. Some versions used a format of as many as twelve independent monaural tracks in parallel on each strip. Each track was recorded one at a time in separate passes and were not intended for later mixdown or stereophony because each monophonic program was unrelated to the next - any more than one random album would be related to the next. Unlike with later half-track and quarter-track monophonic tape recording, the multiple tracks simply multiplied the maximum recording time possible, greatly reducing cost and bulk.

Alan Blumlein, a British engineer at EMI, patented systems for recording stereophonic sound and surround sound on disc and film in 1933. The history of modern multitrack audio recording using magnetic tape began in 1943 with the invention of stereo tape recording, which divided the recording head into two tracks. In 1948, Chicago's Armour Research Foundation announced that its staffer, physicist Marvin Camras, had produced a three-channel machine with "three parallel magnetic tracks on the same tape".

The next major development in multitrack recording came in the mid-1950s, when the Ampex corporation devised the concept of 8-track recording, using its "Sel-Sync" (Selective Synchronous) recording system, and sold the first such machine to musician Les Paul. However, for the next 35 years, multitrack audio recording technology was largely confined to specialist radio, TV and music recording studios, primarily because multitrack tape machines were both very large and very expensive – the first Ampex 8-track recorder, installed in Les Paul's home studio in 1957, cost US$10,000 – roughly three times the US average yearly income in 1957, and equivalent to $114,633 in 2025.

Affordable home multitrack recorders using magnetic tape were introduced in the 1970s. In 1979, the introduction of the TASCAM Portastudio presented a novel format of four tracks running in the same direction and doubled tape speed for the compact audio cassette as its medium, making good-quality four-track multitrack recording available to the average consumer for the first time. TASCAM and Fostex soon introduced reel-to-reel multitrack recorders that also boosted the number of tracks relative to the width of the magnetic tape, such as eight tracks on ¼-inch tape. By then, electronics companies were already introducing digital audio recording systems that used analog magnetic tape as storage media for the digital multitrack data.

By the 1990s, computer-based digital multitrack recording systems such as Pro Tools and Cubase were being adopted by the recording industry, and soon became standard. By the early 2000s, rapid advances in home computing and digital audio software were making digital multitrack audio recording systems available to the average consumer, and high-quality digital multitrack recording systems like GarageBand were being included as a standard feature on home computers.

== Overview ==
Stereo sound recording on tape was perfected in 1943 by German audio engineers working for the AEG corporation. Around 250 stereo tape recordings were made during this period (of which only three have survived), but the technology remained a closely guarded secret within Germany until the end of World War II. After the war, American audio engineer John T. Mullin and the Ampex corporation pioneered the commercial development of tape recording in the US, and the technology was rapidly taken up by radio and the music industry due to its superior sound fidelity and because tape – being a linear recording medium – could be easily edited, by physically cutting and splicing the tape, to remove unwanted elements and create a 'perfect' recording. Two-track tape recording was rapidly adopted for modern music in the early 1950s because it enabled signals from two or more separate microphones to be recorded simultaneously, enabling both twin-track mono recordings (with the voices on one and music on the other) as well as true stereophonic recordings to be made and edited conveniently, which in turn facilitated the rapid expansion of the consumer high-fidelity ("HiFi") market. Stereo (either true binaural two-microphone stereo or multimixed) quickly became the norm for commercial classical recordings and radio broadcasts, although many pop music and jazz recordings continued to be issued in mono sound until the late 1960s.

Much of the credit for the development of multitrack recording goes to guitarist, composer and technician Les Paul, who lent his name to Gibson's first solid-body electric guitar. His experiments with tapes and recorders in the early 1950s led him to order the first custom-built eight-track recorder from Ampex, and his pioneering recordings with his then wife, singer Mary Ford. But it was Patti Page who was the first vocalist to record her own voice, sound on sound, with a song called "Confess", in 1947: Bill Putnam, an engineer for Mercury Records, was able to overdub Page's voice, due to his well-known use of technology.

Mercury was not a large label at the time, and although tape recording had been adopted in Los Angeles earlier in 1947, studios in Chicago were not yet equipped with mono tape technology, let alone multitrack equipment. This session involved recording the orchestra and Page's 4th background vocal onto one lacquer in one pass, playing back the lacquer for her to sing over the top of that with the 3rd background vocal and so on with the main vocal being the last pass utilizing the same technique Les Paul had been experimenting with since the early 1930s.

Thus, although Page became the first pop artist to overdub her vocals on a song, the practice had been utilized with instruments for several years. This was months before Les Paul and Mary Ford had their first multi-voiced release. Paul was the first to make use of the technique of multitracking to record separate elements of a musical piece asynchronously – that is, separate elements could be recorded at different times. Paul's technique enabled him to listen to the tracks he had already cut and record new parts in time alongside them onto first disc and then tape. In 1963, solo jazz pianist Bill Evans recorded Conversations with Myself, an innovative solo album using the unconventional (in jazz solo recordings) technique of overdubbing over himself, in effect creating a two-piano duet of jazz improvisations.

Despite Ampex having created the first eight-track tape machines for Les Paul and Atlantic Records, multitrack recording was taken up in a more limited way in the industry via three-track recorders. These proved extremely useful for popular music, since they enabled backing music to be recorded on two tracks (either to allow the overdubbing of separate parts, or to create a full stereo backing track) while the third track was reserved for the lead vocalist. Three-track recorders remained in widespread commercial use until the mid-1960s and many famous pop recordings – including many of Phil Spector's so-called "Wall of Sound" productions and early Motown hits – were taped on 3-track recorders.

A great many of those utilized multiple 3-track sources with the basic band being recorded on the first three, that being mixed down to mono and "flown over" to a second 3-track, leaving two open. The process was repeated for sidemen, soloists, background singers and any number of other elements before the last track on the last recording stage was used for the lead vocal.

The next evolution was four-track recording, which was the studio standard through the mid 1960s. Many of the most famous recordings by the Beatles and the Rolling Stones were recorded on four-track, and the engineers at London's Abbey Road Studios became particularly adept at the technique called "reduction mixes" in the UK and "bouncing down" in the United States, described in the paragraph above. In this way, it was possible to record literally dozens of separate tracks and combine them into finished recordings of great complexity.

With modern digital sync technology, it is often possible to re-sync all these multiple stage tapes into something loosely resembling a modern 16-track or 24-track session and make it appear as if everything had been recorded onto the same tape, from which a new modern remix could then be performed.

By the mid-1960s, the ready availability of the most up-to-date multitrack recorders – which were by then standard equipment in the leading Los Angeles recording studios – enabled Brian Wilson of the Beach Boys to become one of the first pop producers to exploit the huge potential of multitrack recording. During the group's most innovative period of music-making, from 1964 to 1967, Wilson developed elaborate techniques for assembling the band's songs, which combined elements captured on both four-track and eight-track recorders, as well as making extensive use of tape editing.

By 1964, Wilson's increasingly complex arrangements had far outstripped the group's limited musical abilities – singer-guitarist Carl Wilson was the only group member who regularly contributed to these tracking sessions – so Wilson began frequently recording all the instrumental backing tracks for his songs using the team of top-rank professional studio musicians who came to be known as "The Wrecking Crew", but the band themselves still recorded the instrumental backing for certain songs. For the group's landmark Pet Sounds album in 1966, Wilson recorded all the album's elaborate backing tracks using The Wrecking Crew and other session musicians, while the Beach Boys were away touring, but on the song "That's Not Me", the Beach Boys themselves played on the instrumental backing; the session musicians typically performed these instrumental tracks as ensemble performances, which were recorded and mixed live, direct to a 4-track recorder.

When the other Beach Boys returned from touring, they moved to Columbia's Hollywood studio, which was equipped with the latest eight-track technology; by this time, Wilson and his engineers had 'reduced' the pre-recorded four-track backing tracks to a mono mix, which was then dubbed onto one track of the eight-track master tape; Wilson then recorded the vocal tracks, assigning one individual track to each of the six vocalists (including soon-to-be permanent member Bruce Johnston), leaving the eighth track available for final 'sweetening' elements, such as additional vocal or instrumental touches, and lastly, all these elements were mixed down to the mono master tape. Nearly all of the Beach Boys' four-track and eight-track masters from this period are preserved in Capitol's archive, allowing the label to release several expansive boxed sets of this music; The Pet Sounds Sessions (1997) includes nearly all the separate backing and vocal tracks from the album, as well as new stereo mixes of all the songs, while the nine-CD The Smile Sessions (2011) features a wide cross-section of the huge amount of instrumental and vocal material (totalling around 50 hours of recordings) that was recorded for the group's never-completed 1967 magnum opus Smile.

All of the Beatles classic mid-1960s recordings, including the albums Revolver and Sgt Pepper's Lonely Hearts Club Band, were recorded in this way. There were limitations, however, because of the build-up of noise during the bouncing-down process, and the Abbey Road engineers are still justly famed for the ability to create dense multitrack recordings while keeping background noise to a minimum.

Four-track tape also led to a related development, quadraphonic sound, in which the four tracks were used to create 360-degree surround sound. Thousands of quadraphonic albums were released in the 1970s including Pink Floyd's The Dark Side of the Moon and Mike Oldfield's Tubular Bells. 'Quad' failed to gain wide commercial acceptance at the time, but it was the direct precursor of the surround sound technology that became standard in home theater systems in the 1990s.

In a professional audio setting today, such as a recording studio, audio engineers may use 64 tracks or more for their recordings, using one or more tracks for each instrument played.

The combination of the ability to edit via tape splicing, and the ability to record multiple tracks, revolutionized studio recording. It became common studio recording practice to record on multiple tracks, and mix down afterward. The convenience of tape editing and multitrack recording led to the rapid adoption of magnetic tape as the primary technology for commercial musical recordings. Although 33 1/3 rpm and 45 rpm vinyl records were the dominant consumer format, recordings were customarily made first on magnetic tape, then transferred to disc, with Bing Crosby leading the way in the adoption of this method in the United States.

== Ampex's original eight-track recorder ==
The original Ampex professional eight-track recorder (not to be confused with consumer eight-track tape endless-loop cartridge players), model 5258, was an internal Ampex project. It was based on an Ampex 1 in (25 mm) data recorder transport with modified Ampex model 350 electronics. It stood over 7 feet (2.1 m) tall and weighed 250 pounds (110 kg). Eight tracks were chosen because that was the number of 0.070 inches (1.8 mm) recording tracks with 0.060 inches (1.5 mm) guard tracks that would fit on a 1 inch (25 mm) recording tape, the widest tape available at the time.

The first of the Ampex eight-track recorders was sold to Les Paul for $10,000 in 1957 and was installed in his home recording studio by David Sarser. It became known as the "Octopus".

The second Ampex model 5258 eight-track was sold to Atlantic Records at Tom Dowd's insistence in late 1957. Atlantic was the first record company to use a multitrack (as opposed to stereo or three-track) recorder in their studio.

== Multi-channel recorders ==
Multitrack recording differs from overdubbing and sound on sound because it records separate signals to individual tracks. Sound on sound, which Les Paul invented, adds a new performance to an existing recording by placing a second playback head in front of the erase head to play back the existing track before erasing it and re-recording a new track.

Multitrack recorders also differ from early stereo and three-track recorders that were available at the time in that they can record individual tracks while preserving the other tracks. The original multi-channel recorders could only record all tracks at once.

The earliest multitrack recorders were analog magnetic tape machines with two or three tracks. Elvis Presley was first recorded on multitrack during 1957, as RCA's engineers were testing their new machines. Buddy Holly's last studio session in 1958 employed three-track recording, resulting in his only stereo releases not to include overdubs. The new three-track system allowed the lead vocal to be recorded on a dedicated track, while the remaining two tracks could be used to record the backing tracks in full stereo.

== Other early multitrack recorders ==
Frank Zappa experimented in the early 1960s with a custom-built five-track recorder built by engineer Paul Buff in his Pal Recording Studio in Rancho Cucamonga, California. Buff later went on to work in larger Hollywood studios. However, recorders with four or more tracks were restricted mainly to major American recording studios until the mid-to-late 1960s, mainly because of import restrictions and the high cost of the technology. In England, pioneering independent producer Joe Meek produced all of his innovative early 1960s recordings using monophonic and two-track recorders. Like Meek, EMI house producer George Martin was considered an innovator for his use of two-track as a means to making better mono records, carefully balancing vocals and instruments; Abbey Road Studios installed Telefunken four-track machines in 1959 and 1960 (replaced in 1965 by smaller, more durable Studer machines), but The Beatles would not have access to them until late 1963, and all recordings prior to their first world hit single "I Want to Hold Your Hand" (1964) were made on two-track machines.

== Impact on popular music ==
The artistic potential of the multitrack recorder came to the attention of the public in the 1960s, when artists such as the Beatles and the Beach Boys began to multitrack extensively, and from then on virtually all popular music was recorded in this manner. The technology developed very rapidly during these years. At the start of their careers, the Beatles and Beach Boys each recorded live to mono, two-track (the Beatles), or three-track (the Beach Boys); by 1965 they used multitracking to create pop music of unprecedented complexity.

The Beach Boys' acclaimed 1966 LP Pet Sounds relied on multitrack recorders for its innovative production. Brian Wilson pretaped all the instrumental backing tracks with a large ensemble, recording the performances live, direct to a four-track recorder. These four-track backing tapes were then 'dubbed down' to one track of an eight-track tape. Six of the remaining seven tracks were then used to individually record the vocals of each member of The Beach Boys, and the eighth track was reserved for any final 'sweetening' overdubs of instruments or voices.

3M introduced the 1-inch (25 mm) eight-track version of their model M-23 recorder in 1966, the first mass-produced machine of this format. It remained in production until 1970 and was used by many top studios worldwide including Abbey Road Studios in London. Both Pete Townshend and John Lennon had 3M eight-track machines in their home project studios c. 1969–1970. Ampex began mass production of their competing 1-inch (25 mm) eight-track MM1000 in 1967. One of the first eight-track machines in Los Angeles was built by Scully Recording Instruments of Bridgeport, Connecticut and installed at American Recorders in late 1967. The debut album by Steppenwolf was recorded there and was released in January 1968.

Because The Beatles did not gain access to eight-track recorders until 1968, their groundbreaking Sgt Pepper's Lonely Hearts Club Band LP (1967) was created using pairs of four-track machines; the group also used vari-speed (also called pitch shift) to achieve unique sounds, and they were the first group in the world to use an important offshoot of multitrack recording, the Automatic Double Tracking (ADT) system invented by Abbey Road staff engineer Ken Townsend in 1966.

Other artists began experimenting with multitrack possibilities. The Music Machine recorded the hit song Talk Talk in August 1966 on a custom-built ten-track tape recorder at Original Sound studio in Los Angeles. Pink Floyd collaborated with former Beatles recording engineer Norman "Hurricane" Smith, who produced their first two albums on four-track recorders.

The first eight-track machine in the UK was an Ampex machine installed at London's Trident Studios in early 1968. At about the same time Advision Studios installed a similar machine built by Scully. Among the first eight-track recordings made at Advision were the single Dogs by The Who and the album My People Were Fair and Had Sky in Their Hair... But Now They're Content to Wear Stars on Their Brows by the band Tyrannosaurus Rex. It was during The Beatles' recording of their White Album sessions of late 1968 that Abbey Road Studios finally had eight-track recorders installed. Until then the group went to Trident to record with eight-tracks. The Beatles used eight-track machines to record portions of the White Album, the song "Hey Jude" and later, Abbey Road.

Other western countries also lagged well behind the United States – in Australia, the largest local recording label, Festival Records, did not install a four-track recorder until late 1966; the first eight-track recorders did not appear there until the late 1960s.

== Large format analog recorders ==
In February 1968 Billboard magazine reported that Bell Sound Studios in New York City was already operating an innovative 12-track 2-inch tape recorder of their own design. As this was the only machine of its kind it lacked it compatibility with other studios.

In 1967, Ampex built its first prototype 16-track professional audio recorder at the request of Mirasound Studios in New York City. This unique machine was the first of its type and used reels of 2-inch (51 mm) tape on a modified tape transport system originally built for video recording. The album Everything Playing by The Lovin' Spoonful was recorded on 16-track at Mirasound and released in December 1967. Ampex introduced the 16-track production model MM-1000 in 1968, the first commercially available 16-track machine. Machines of this size are difficult to move and costly to maintain. Prices were very high, typically $10,000 to $30,000 U.S. dollars.

One of the first 16-track recorders was installed at CBS Studios in New York City where it was used to record the second album by Blood, Sweat & Tears, recorded in October 1968 and released in December 1968. The Grateful Dead released their first 16-track recordings Aoxomoxoa in June 1969 and Live/Dead in November 1969. TTG Studios in Los Angeles built its own 16-track machine in 1968. This was used on Frank Zappa's album Hot Rats released in October 1969. Volunteers by Jefferson Airplane was released in November 1969. The back of the Jefferson Airplane album cover includes a picture of the 16-track MM-1000.

In June 1969 Billboard magazine reported on the proliferation of Ampex's MM-1000-16, with a starting price of $17,000: "[in Los Angeles] local studios ordering 16-track machines are Columbia, Don Costa Productions, RCA, Soul Recorders, Sound Emporium, Sunset Sounds, Vox Studios and LewRon." Ampex's MM-1000 was available with 24 tracks on 2-inch (51 mm) tape as early as April, 1969.

Advision and Trident were among the first studios in the UK to install 16-track machines. Trident installed its first 16-track machine in late 1969. "After The Flood", a song from the Van der Graaf Generator album The Least We Can Do Is Wave To Each Other, was recorded at this studio on 16 tracks in December 1969. Production of 16-track machines boomed and the number of studios worldwide using these machines exploded during 1970 and 1971. By the end of 1971, there were at least 21 studios in London using 16-track recorders in conjunction with Dolby Laboratories noise reduction. Artists using Trident at this time also included Genesis and David Bowie as well as Queen who experimented with multitracking extensively most prominently on their albums Queen II and A Night at the Opera.

Australia's first 16-track recorder was installed at Armstrong Studios in Melbourne in 1971; Festival installed Australia's first 24-track recorder at its Sydney studio in 1974. During the 1970s, 16 and 24 tracks became common in professional studios, with recording tape two inches (5.08 cm) wide. The so-called "golden age" of large format professional analog recorders would last into the 1990s when the technology was mostly replaced with digital tape machines, and later on, computer systems using hard disk drives instead of tape. Some music producers and musicians still prefer working with the sound of vintage analog recording equipment despite the additional costs and difficulties involved.

Large format analog multitrack machines typically have up to 24 tracks on a tape 2 inches (51 mm) wide which is the widest analog tape that is generally available. In late 1967 AMPEX offered its version in this format, at $32,000 (a 16-track model was $24,950). Prototype machines, by MCI in 1978, using 3 in (76 mm) tape for 32 tracks never went into production. Otari made a 32-track 2 in (51 mm) model MX-80. Stephens Electronics made a limited number of 40-track 2 inch machines, however neither the 32 or 40 track formats were widely used. A few studios still operate large format analog recorders, though much of the time their use is only to copy sounds onto a modern digital format. Maintaining these machines has become increasingly difficult as new parts are rarely available. New tape is still available but prices have risen significantly in recent years.

== Home systems ==
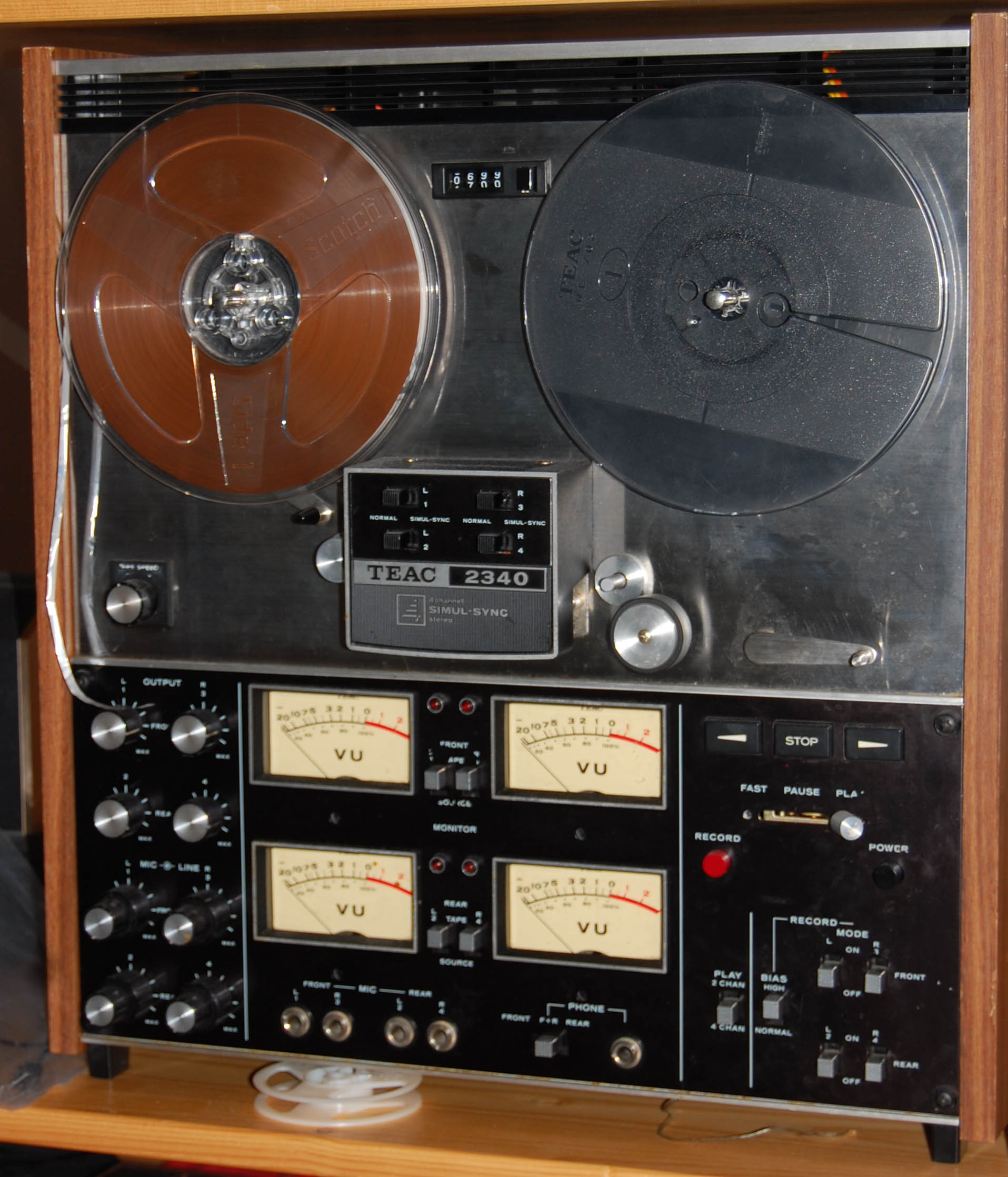
The TEAC 2340, a popular early (1973) home multitrack recorder, four tracks on 1/4-inch (6.4 mm) tape.

In 1972 TEAC marketed their consumer four-channel quadraphonic tape recorders for use as home multitrack recorders. The result were the popular TEAC 2340 and 3340 models. Both used 1/4-inch (6.4 mm) tape. The 2340 ran at either 3 3/4 in/s (9.5 cm/s) or 7 1/2 in/s (19 cm/s) and used 7-inch (180 mm) reels while the 3340 ran at 7 1/2 in (190 mm) or 15 in/s (38 cm/s) and used 10 1/2-inch (270 mm) reels. The 2340 was priced at under US$1,000 making it very popular for home use.

The advent of the compact audio cassette (developed in 1963) ultimately led to affordable, portable four-track machines such as the Tascam Portastudio which debuted in 1979. Cassette-based machines could not provide the same audio quality as reel-to-reel machines, but served as a useful tool for professional and semi-pro musicians in making song demos. The Portastudio had a revolutionary effect on popular songwriting, recording and production, because it enabled artists to make recordings without signing to a record label. Many artists then self-produced their own recordings, duplicated them to the standard audio cassette format and sold them directly at gigs and via advertisements. Bruce Springsteen's 1982 album Nebraska was made this way, with Springsteen choosing the album's earlier demo versions over the later studio recordings.

The familiar tape cassette was designed to accommodate four channels of audio. In a commercially produced cassette, these four tracks constituted the stereo channels (each consisting of two tracks) for both "sides" of the cassette; in a four-track cassette recorder, all four tracks play simultaneously, typically at double speed (3 3/4 in/s [9.5 cm/s] instead of 1 7/8 in/s [4.8 cm/s]) for increased fidelity. A separate signal can be recorded on each of the four tracks. (As such, the four-track machine does not use the two separate sides of the cassette in the conventional sense; if the cassette is inserted the other way round, all four tracks play in reverse.) As with professional machines, two or more tracks can be bounced down to one. When recording is complete, the volume level of each track is optimized, each track is separately 'panned' to the desired point in the stereo field and the resulting stereo signal is mixed down to a separate stereo machine (such as a conventional cassette recorder).

== Digital multitracking ==
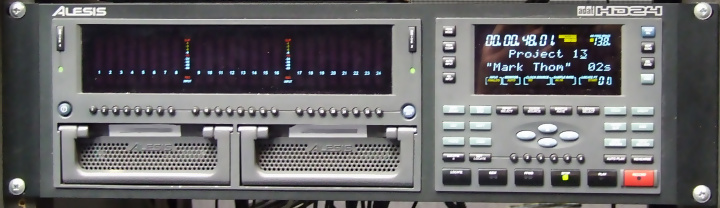
The Alesis HD24 stand-alone multitrack hard disk recorder

By the early 1970s, Thomas Stockham of Soundstream, created the first practical use of pulse-code modulation, also called PCM digital recording, for high fidelity purposes. The first to be released were rereleased cleaned up versions of acoustic recordings made by the great tenor, Enrico Caruso. Early computer algorithms were used in the process of cleaning up the scratchy old 78 RPM records. The process could not be done in "real time" as the early computers were not very powerful or fast, compared to 2010-era computers. All of the data had to be stored on linear digital tape and then played back, in real time. The actual ingest from the 78 RPM records to the digital tape was also done in real-time. The computer processing to clean up the surface noise, pops and scratches took the early computers quite some time to process.

By the late 1970s, 3M introduced the first digital multitrack recorder. It used 1-inch (25 mm) wide specially formulated tape and recorded 32 tracks at 45 inches per second (110 cm/s). Unlike analog tape, edits could not be accomplished with a grease pencil, razor blades and splicing tape. A secondary four-track editing and mix down recorder was also created with an electronically controlled edit controller to make effective digital edits. The only converters of the day were twelve-bit and four-bit. So two were cascaded/daisy-chained to create the necessary 16-bit "word" for 96 DB of dynamic range. The signal was then sampled faster than any other digital recordings made up until that time at 50,000 times per second (50 kHz). 50 kHz sampling did not become the industry standards later established as 44.1 kHz for CDs & 48 kHz for digital video.

The accepted world standard was created by Sony along with Philips. Sony created a 24-track digital recorder and Mitsubishi Corporation created a different 32-track digital recorder. The Mitsubishi recorded their data differently and it could be edited, the old-fashioned analog way, with a razor blade and splicing tape. The Sony used 1/2-inch (13 mm) tape whereas the Mitsubishi used 1-inch (25 mm) wide tape. So the first recordings that were released produced on the 3M, 32-track digital recorder were still analog vinyl releases, until audio compact discs made their debut in the marketplace in the early 1980s. These professional linear tape digital recorders established the "DASH" format meaning, " Digital Audio Stationary Head".

Starting in 1992, the ALESIS Corporation, a company that makes digital drum machines and made inexpensive analog audio mixers introduced the first multitrack, eight-track, project studio, digital eight-track machine. It was named the ADAT, after the earlier two-track digital recorders of the time known as DAT (Digital Audio Tape), which were based upon a small spinning head, similar to a consumer video recorder. The ADAT machine recorded its data in an already well-established consumer format based on VHS videotape recorder technology. Eight separate data tracks were recorded within the same bandwidth it took to record a TV show on a home video recorder (VHS). Numerous machines could be electronically locked together with a single cable. Eight-track machines could be plugged together to create a 128-track machine. And like the professional studio recorders before it, a large full-function remote control was also available.

The following year, the TEAC/TASCAM Corporation, introduced their DA-88. Those used the smaller 8 mm video format tapes. Those recorded four duplexed pairs of data tracks and would require a "read before write" function for overdubbing purposes of adjacent tracks. A full-size remote and remote metering was also made available. Later units introduced by both companies provided for higher bit depths such as 20- and 24-bit. These machines like the early home studio TEAC's before them, slashed the prices of professional digital multitrack recording. It changed the recording industry forever.

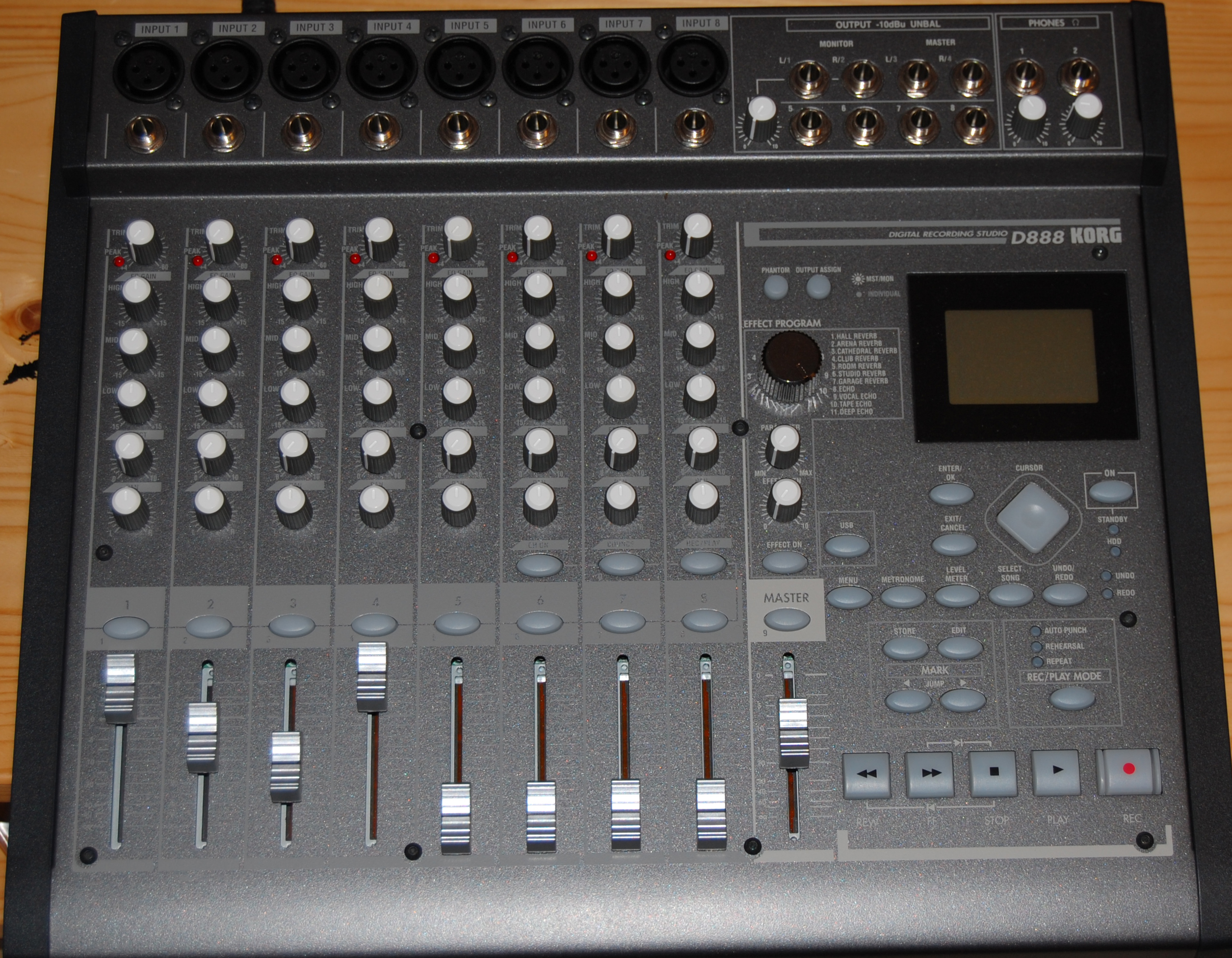
Korg D888 eight-track digital recorder

By the late 1990s, dedicated multitrack recorders faded with the introduction of the Macintosh operating system and Windows operating systems in personal computers. Some of the first companies jumping on board with this technology were New England Digital and Digidesign, from the US, and Fairlight, from Australia. Through the 1990s, multitrack recorders became digital, using a variety of technologies and media types. These including digital tape format (such as ADAT), or in some cases Minidiscs.

Some of the leading providers of multitrackers were Tascam (hard drive or cassette based), Alesis (ADAT digital tape based), Roland/Boss (hard drive based), Fostex (hard drive based), Yamaha (hard drive based), and Korg.

== Computer-based recording ==
The first software-based digital multitrack recorder, called Deck, was released in 1990. The core engine technology and much of the user interface was programmed and designed by Josh Rosen, Mats Myrberg and John Dalton from a small San Francisco based company. They formed the platform upon which Pro Tools was built in 1991. The same technology lay behind the 1992 release of Cubase Audio, the first version to offer audio support in addition to MIDI sequencing capabilities.

While hardware costs have fallen, the power of the personal computer has increased, so that in the 2010s a good-quality home computer is sufficiently powerful to serve as a complete multitrack recorder. Using inexpensive hardware and software, a band or performer can use a setup as simple as a USB microphone, or a regular microphone plugged into a USB Audio Interface to create high quality productions within the confines of their bedroom. Since 2012, the multitracking software GarageBand is offered as a free download for all of Apple's new computers or $4.99 for older models. Audacity added to the many free or under $100 solutions available to the Windows platform that run on less expensive but often more powerful hardware. In a price range between $150 and usually under $1000, superior software mimicking complex recording studios that once could cost $100,000, or more, are also available However solutions this powerful are not needed for most applications. This is a far cry from the days when multitrack recorders cost thousands of dollars and few people could afford them. In early (circa) 2000 the availability of low cost CakeWalk for Windows provided opportunities for many to get a start in multitrack digital recording on Windows for around $50 to $100. After hardware became more powerful, more capabilities became available, including more digital channels and plug in effects.

In the 2010s, the availability of inexpensive software coupled with low cost hardware solutions, have enabled many singer-songwriters to self-produce their first recordings without paying high fees for a professional recording studio or audio engineer. The most popular DAW today are FL Studio, Pro Tools, REAPER, Ableton Live, Cubase, Logic Pro and Digital Performer.

== See also ==
- Sound follower
- Tom Dowd and the Language of Music
