= 2003 Toronto International Film Festival =

Annual Canadian film festival

- Festival poster
- Opening film: The Barbarian Invasions
- Closing film: Danny Deckchair
- Location: Toronto, Ontario, Canada
- Hosted by: Toronto International Film Festival Group
- No. of films: 336 films
- Festival date: September 4, 2003–September 13, 2003
- Language: English
- Website: tiff.net
- 2004 2002

The 28th Toronto International Film Festival ran from September 4 to September 13, 2003. A total of 336 films (252 feature length and 84 short films) from 55 countries were screened during the festival. Of the feature films, 73% were world, international, or North American premieres.

== Awards ==
Award	Film	Director
People's Choice Award	Zatōichi	Takeshi Kitano
Discovery Award	Rhinoceros Eyes	Aaron Woodley
Best Canadian Feature Film	The Barbarian Invasions	Denys Arcand
Best Canadian First Feature Film	Love, Sex and Eating the Bones	Sudz Sutherland
Best Canadian Short Film	Aspiration	Constant Mentzas
FIPRESCI International Critics' Award	Noviembre	Achero Mañas

== Programme ==
=== Viacom Galas ===
- Bon Voyage directed by Jean-Paul Rappeneau
- The Boys from County Clare directed by John Irvin
- Code 46 directed by Michael Winterbottom
- The Company directed by Robert Altman
- Danny Deckchair directed by Jeff Balsmeyer
- Girl with a Pearl Earring directed by Peter Webber
- Good Morning, Night directed by Marco Bellocchio
- The Human Stain directed by Robert Benton
- In the Cut directed by Jane Campion
- The Barbarian Invasions directed by Denys Arcand
- Mambo Italiano directed by Émile Gaudreault
- Matchstick Men directed by Ridley Scott
- Nathalie... directed by Anne Fontaine
- Out of Time directed by Carl Franklin
- The Republic of Love directed by Deepa Mehta
- Rosenstrasse directed by Margarethe von Trotta
- School of Rock directed by Richard Linklater
- Veronica Guerin directed by Joel Schumacher

=== Canadian Open Vault ===
- The Apprenticeship of Duddy Kravitz directed by Ted Kotcheff

=== Canadian Retrospective ===
- Back to God's Country directed by David M. Hartford
- A Bear, a Boy and a Dog directed by Bert Van Tuyle
- The Grub Stake directed by Bert Van Tuyle and Nell Shipman
- The Light on Lookout directed by Bert Van Tuyle and Nell Shipman
- Something New directed by Bert Van Tuyle and Nell Shipman
- The Story of Mr. Hobbs directed by Lorenzo Alagio
- The Trail of the North Wind directed by Nell Shipman
- White Water directed by Bert Van Tuyle and Nell Shipman

=== Contemporary World Cinema ===
- Abjad directed by Abolfazl Jalili
- Alexandra's Project directed by Rolf de Heer
- Antenna directed by Kazuyoshi Kumakiri
- At Five in the Afternoon directed by Samira Makhmalbaf
- B-Happy directed by Gonzalo Justiniano
- Bright Young Things directed by Stephen Fry
- Broken Wings directed by Nir Bergman
- Crimson Gold directed by Jafar Panahi
- Since Otar Left directed by Julie Bertuccelli
- Drifters directed by Wang Xiaoshuai
- Dummy directed by Greg Pritikin
- Errance directed by Damien Odoul
- The Event directed by Thom Fitzgerald
- Evil directed by Mikael Håfström
- Facing Windows directed by Ferzan Özpetek
- Forest directed by Benedek Fliegauf
- Böse Zellen directed by Barbara Albert
- Fuse directed by Pjer Žalica
- The Galíndez File directed by Gerardo Herrero
- Golden Chicken directed by Samson Chiu
- Good Bye, Lenin! directed by Wolfgang Becker
- A Good Lawyer's Wife directed by Im Sang-soo
- Grimm directed by Alex van Warmerdam
- Gun-Shy directed by Dito Tsintsadze
- Incantato directed by Pupi Avati
- The Hours of the Day directed by Jaime Rosales
- I'm Not Scared directed by Gabriele Salvatores
- Identity Kills directed by Sören Voigt
- In the City directed by Cesc Gay
- Intermission directed by John Crowley
- Interview directed by Theo van Gogh
- James' Journey to Jerusalem directed by Ra'anan Alexandrowicz
- Japanese Story directed by Sue Brooks
- Kamchatka directed by Marcelo Piñeyro
- Kitchen Stories directed by Bent Hamer
- Last Life in the Universe directed by Pen-ek Ratanaruang
- The Last Virgin directed by Joel Lamangan
- Loving Glances directed by Srđan Karanović
- The Magic Gloves directed by Martín Rejtman
- Where Is Madame Catherine? directed by Marc Recha
- Memories of Murder directed by Bong Joon-ho
- Milwaukee, Minnesota directed by Allan Mindel
- The Mother directed by Roger Michell
- My Life Without Me directed by Isabel Coixet
- Noi the Albino directed by Dagur Kári
- Nicotina directed by Hugo Rodríguez
- Nos enfants chéris directed by Benoît Cohen
- Osama directed by Siddiq Barmak
- Pieces of April directed by Peter Hedges
- Prey for Rock & Roll directed by Alex Steyermark
- The Principles of Lust directed by Penny Woolcock
- Prosti directed by Erik Matti
- PTU directed by Johnnie To
- Pupendo directed by Jan Hřebejk
- Purple Butterfly directed by Lou Ye
- Who Killed Bambi? directed by Gilles Marchand
- Ramblers directed by Nobuhiro Yamashita
- Remake directed by Dino Mustafić
- Remember Me, My Love directed by Gabriele Muccino
- The Return directed by Andrey Zvyagintsev
- Secret File directed by Paolo Benvenuti
- Shara directed by Naomi Kawase
- Silence Between Two Thoughts directed by Babak Payami
- So Far Away directed by Juan Carlos Tabío
- Al sur de Granada directed by Fernando Colomo
- Spring, Summer, Fall, Winter... and Spring directed by Kim Ki-duk
- Stander directed by Bronwen Hughes
- Stormy Weather directed by Sólveig Anspach
- Struggle directed by Ruth Mader
- SuperTex directed by Jan Schütte
- Testosterone directed by David Moreton
- All the Fine Promises directed by Jean-Paul Civeyrac
- Travellers and Magicians directed by Dzongsar Jamyang Khyentse Rinpoche
- Vibrator directed by Ryūichi Hiroki
- Vodka Lemon directed by Hiner Saleem
- What the Eye Doesn't See directed by Francisco José Lombardi
- Wilbur Wants to Kill Himself directed by Lone Scherfig
- Wonderland directed by James Cox
- Young Adam directed by David Mackenzie

=== Dialogues: Talking With Pictures ===
- Alien directed by Ridley Scott
- Bad Timing directed by Nicolas Roeg
- Ikiru directed by Akira Kurosawa
- Nashville directed by Robert Altman
- One from the Heart directed by Francis Ford Coppola
- Twenty Years Later directed by Eduardo Coutinho

=== Spotlight ===
- Clouds of May directed by Nuri Bilge Ceylan
- The Confession directed by Zeki Demirkubuz
- Uzak directed by Nuri Bilge Ceylan
- Encounter directed by Ömer Kavur
- Fate directed by Zeki Demirkubuz
- Anayurt Oteli directed by Ömer Kavur
- The Secret Face directed by Ömer Kavur
- Kasaba directed by Nuri Bilge Ceylan
- The Third Page directed by Zeki Demirkubuz

=== Discovery ===
- 11:14 directed by Greg Marcks
- 16 Years of Alcohol directed by Richard Jobson
- Ana and the Others directed by Celina Murga
- Christmas directed by Gregory King
- Les corps impatients directed by Xavier Giannoli
- Dallas 362 directed by Scott Caan
- Easy directed by Jane Weinstock
- The Green Butchers directed by Anders Thomas Jensen
- I Love Your Work directed by Adam Goldberg
- Love Me If You Dare directed by Yann Samuell
- Koktebel directed by Boris Khlebnikov and Alexei Popogrebski
- The Last Customer directed by Nanni Moretti
- Madness and Genius directed by Ryan Eslinger
- Maqbool directed by Vishal Bhardwaj
- My Father and I directed by Xu Jinglei
- My Town directed by Marek Lechki
- Matrubhoomi directed by Manish Jha
- Noviembre directed by Achero Mañas
- Rhinoceros Eyes directed by Aaron Woodley
- Rick directed by Curtiss Clayton
- Sexual Dependency directed by Rodrigo Bellott
- A Smile directed by Park Kyung-hee
- Ljeto u zlatnoj dolini directed by Srđan Vuletić
- This Little Life directed by Sarah Gavron
- The Triggerstreet.com Project

=== Masters ===
- Casa de los Babys directed by John Sayles
- Chokher Bali, A Passion Play directed by Rituparno Ghosh
- Come and Go directed by João César Monteiro
- Dying at Grace directed by Allan King
- Elephant directed by Gus Van Sant
- I'll Sleep When I'm Dead directed by Mike Hodges
- A Talking Picture directed by Manoel de Oliveira
- Le Temps du Loup directed by Michael Haneke
- Zatoichi directed by Takeshi Kitano

=== Midnight Madness ===
- Cypher directed by Vincenzo Natali
- End of the Century: The Story of the Ramones directed by Jim Fields and Michael Gramaglia
- Gozu directed by Takashi Miike
- The Grudge directed by Takashi Shimizu
- Haute Tension directed by Alexandre Aja
- Ong-Bak: Muay Thai Warrior directed by Prachya Pinkaew
- Save the Green Planet! directed by Jang Joon-hwan
- Undead directed by Peter Spierig and Michael Spierig
- Underworld directed by Len Wiseman

=== National Cinema ===
- Bus 174 directed by José Padilha
- Carandiru directed by Hector Babenco
- God Is Brazilian directed by Carlos Diegues
- The Man of the Year directed by José Henrique Fonseca
- Margarette's Feast directed by Renato Falcão
- The Middle of the World directed by Vicente Amorim
- The Storytellers directed by Eliane Caffé

=== Perspective Canada ===
- 8:17 p.m. Darling Street (20h17, rue Darling) directed by Bernard Émond
- Animal Nightmares directed by Peter Lynch
- Aspiration directed by Constant Mentzas
- Bager directed by Tomi Grgicevic
- The Big Charade directed by Jesse McKeown
- The Bread Maker directed by Anita McGee
- The Corporation directed by Mark Achbar and Jennifer Abbott
- Déformation Personnelle directed by Jean-François Asselin
- Defile in Veil directed by Deco Dawson
- DNA directed by Jack Blum
- The Dog Walker directed by James Genn
- Emile directed by Carl Bessai
- Exposures directed by Matt Sinclair-Foreman
- An Eye for an Eye directed by David Rimmer
- Falling Angels directed by Scott Smith
- The Fever of the Western Nile directed by Deco Dawson
- Flyerman directed by Jeff Stephenson and Jason Tan
- The Garden directed by Jason Buxton
- Gaz Bar Blues directed by Louis Bélanger
- Grotesque directed by Wrik Mead
- Guest Room directed by Skander Halim
- her carnal longings directed by Izabella Pruska-Oldenhof
- Hollywood North directed by Peter O'Brian
- Imitations of Life directed by Mike Hoolboom
- In the Dark directed by Mike Hoolboom
- Jours en fleurs directed by Louise Bourque
- The Last Night directed by Mathieu Guez
- A Little Life directed by Elizabeth Murray
- Love, Sex and Eating the Bones directed by Sudz Sutherland
- The Magical Life of Long Tack Sam directed by Ann Marie Fleming
- Mardi (Quel jour était-ce?) directed by Lyne Charlebois
- Moccasin Flats directed by Randy Redroad
- Noël Blank directed by Jean-François Rivard
- Not a Fish Story directed by Anita Doron
- Nothing directed by Vincenzo Natali
- On the Corner directed by Nathaniel Geary
- Passages directed by John Price
- Perfect directed by Boris Rodriguez
- Pop Song directed by Charles Officer
- A Problem with Fear directed by Gary Burns
- Proteus directed by John Greyson
- Saskatchewan Part 2 directed by Brian Stockton
- The School directed by Ezra Krybus and Matthew Miller
- She Was Cuba directed by Ho Tam
- Shooting Star directed by Jason Britski
- Sometimes a Voice directed by Simon Davidson
- Song of Wreckage directed by Ryan Redford
- Terminal Venus directed by Alexandre Franchi
- Todd and the Book of Pure Evil directed by Craig D. Wallace
- Totem: The Return of the G'psgolox Pole directed by Gil Cardinal
- The Truth About the Head directed by Dale Heslip
- Twist directed by Jacob Tierney
- Why the Anderson Children Didn't Come to Dinner directed by Jamie Travis
- Wildflowers directed by Geoffrey Uloth
- X Man directed by Christopher Hinton

=== Planet Africa ===
- Afropunk: The "Rock n Roll Nigger" Experience directed by James Spooner
- Dark directed by D.A. Bullock
- His/Her Story directed by Nzinga Kemp
- Histoire de Tresses directed by Jacqueline Kalimunda
- How to Get the Man's Foot Out of Your Ass directed by Mario Van Peebles
- Mille Mois directed by Faouzi Bensaïdi
- Moi et mon blanc directed by S. Pierre Yameogo
- One Love directed by Rick Elgood and Don Letts
- Outcry directed by Destau Damtou
- Short on Sugar directed by Joseph Anaya
- Le silence de la forêt directed by Didier Ouénangaré and Bassek ba Kobhio
- The Sky in Her Eyes directed by Ouida Smit and Madoda Ncayiyana
- Soldiers of the Rock directed by Norman Maake
- Strange & Charmed directed by Shari Frilot
- Valley of the Innocent directed by Branwen Okpako
- Les Yeux secs directed by Narjiss Nejjar

=== Real to Reel ===
- The Agronomist directed by Jonathan Demme
- Aileen: Life and Death of a Serial Killer directed by Nick Broomfield and Joan Churchill
- The Blonds directed by Albertina Carri
- Bright Leaves directed by Ross McElwee
- Destiny's Children directed by Pimmi Pândé
- Dream Cuisine directed by Li Ying
- Investigation into the Invisible World directed by Jean-Michel Roux
- Festival Express directed by Bob Smeaton
- The Five Obstructions directed by Lars von Trier and Jørgen Leth
- Game Over: Kasparov and the Machine directed by Vikram Jayanti
- Jesus, You Know directed by Ulrich Seidl
- Los Angeles Plays Itself directed by Thom Andersen
- Mayor of the Sunset Strip directed by George Hickenlooper
- Molly & Mobarak directed by Tom Zubrycki
- The Passion of María Elena directed by Mercedes Moncada
- The Revolution Will Not Be Televised directed by Kim Bartley and Donnacha O'Briain
- S21, La Machine de mort Khmère Rouge directed by Rithy Panh
- The Story of the Weeping Camel directed by Byambasuren Davaa and Luigi Falorni
- Tibet: Cry of the Snow Lion directed by Tom Peosay
- Tom Dowd and the Language of Music directed by Mark Moormann
- West of the Tracks, Part I: Rust directed by Wang Bing
- West of the Tracks, Part II: Remnants directed by Wang Bing
- West of the Tracks, Part III: Rails directed by Wang Bing
- The Yes Men directed by Dan Ollman, Sarah Price and Chris Smith

=== Special Presentations ===
- 21 Grams directed by Alejandro González Iñárritu
- Alila directed by Amos Gitaï
- The Best of Youth directed by Marco Tullio Giordana
- Cheeky directed by David Thewlis
- Coffee and Cigarettes directed by Jim Jarmusch
- The Cooler directed by Wayne Kramer
- Dogville directed by Lars von Trier
- Far Side of the Moon directed by Robert Lepage
- The Fog of War directed by Errol Morris
- Go Further directed by Ron Mann
- The Gospel of John directed by Philip Saville
- La Grande Séduction directed by Jean-François Pouliot
- L' Histoire de Marie et Julien directed by Jacques Rivette
- Lost in Translation directed by Sofia Coppola
- Love Actually directed by Richard Curtis
- The Merry Widow directed by Erich von Stroheim
- Monsieur Ibrahim directed by François Dupeyron
- Père et fils directed by Michel Boujenah
- Raja directed by Jacques Doillon
- The Saddest Music in the World directed by Guy Maddin
- Les Sentiments directed by Noémie Lvovsky
- Shattered Glass directed by Billy Ray
- The Singing Detective directed by Keith Gordon
- The Snow Walker directed by Charles Martin Smith
- The Station Agent directed by Tom McCarthy
- Touching the Void directed by Kevin Macdonald
- Valentín directed by Alejandro Agresti
- Zhou Yu's Train directed by Sun Zhou

=== Visions ===
- Bright Future directed by Kiyoshi Kurosawa
- The Brown Bunny directed by Vincent Gallo
- Cremaster 3 directed by Matthew Barney
- Good Bye, Dragon Inn directed by Tsai Ming-liang
- Greendale directed by Bernard Shakey a.k.a. Neil Young
- In This World directed by Michael Winterbottom
- Nine Souls directed by Toshiaki Toyoda
- Des Plumes dans la tête directed by Thomas de Thier
- Sansa directed by Siegfried
- The Tesseract directed by Oxide Pang
- The Triplets of Belleville (Les Triplettes de Belleville) directed by Sylvain Chomet
- The Tulse Luper Suitcases, Episode 3. Antwerp directed by Peter Greenaway
- The Tulse Luper Suitcases, Part 1. The Moab Story directed by Peter Greenaway
- Twentynine Palms directed by Bruno Dumont

=== Wavelengths ===
- Bouquet 25 directed by Rose Lowder
- Chinese Series directed by Stan Brakhage
- Cocteau Cento directed by Dan Boord and Luis Valdovino
- Early Monthly Segments directed by Robert Beavers
- Fear of Blushing directed by Jennifer Reeves
- The Ground directed by Robert Beavers
- He Walked Away directed by Jennifer Reeves
- The Hedge Theater directed by Robert Beavers
- Horizontal Boundaries Second Projection directed by Pat O'Neill
- In the Garden directed by Ute Aurand and Bärbel Freund
- Interior directed by Jim Jennings
- Let's Make a Sandwich directed by Pat O'Neill
- Meditations on Revolution, Part V: Foreign City directed by Robert Fenz
- Megalopolis directed by Jim Jennings
- No directed by Sharon Lockhart
- Noor directed by Deborah Phillips
- Outline directed by Sandra Gibson
- Psalm III: "Night of the Meek" directed by Phil Solomon
- Quadro directed by Lotte Schreiber
- Rolling in My Ears directed by Barry Gerson
- Seasons directed by Phil Solomon and Stan Brakhage
- Stan's Window and Work in Progress directed by Stan Brakhage
- System of Transitions directed by Johannes Hammel
- Translucent Appearances directed by Barry Gerson
- The Visitation directed by Nathaniel Dorsky

== Canada's Top Ten ==
TIFF's annual Canada's Top Ten list, its national critics and festival programmers poll of the ten best feature and short films of the year, was released in December 2003.

- 8:17 p.m. Darling Street (20h17 rue Darling) - Bernard Émond
- The Barbarian Invasions (Les Invasion barbares) — Denys Arcand
- The Corporation — Mark Achbar, Jennifer Abbott
- Dying at Grace — Allan King
- Falling Angels — Scott Smith
- Far Side of the Moon (La Face cachée de la lune) — Robert Lepage
- Love, Sex and Eating the Bones — Sudz Sutherland
- My Life Without Me — Isabel Coixet
- On the Corner — Nathaniel Geary
- The Saddest Music in the World — Guy Maddin
