= Optical sound =

Storing sound recordings on film

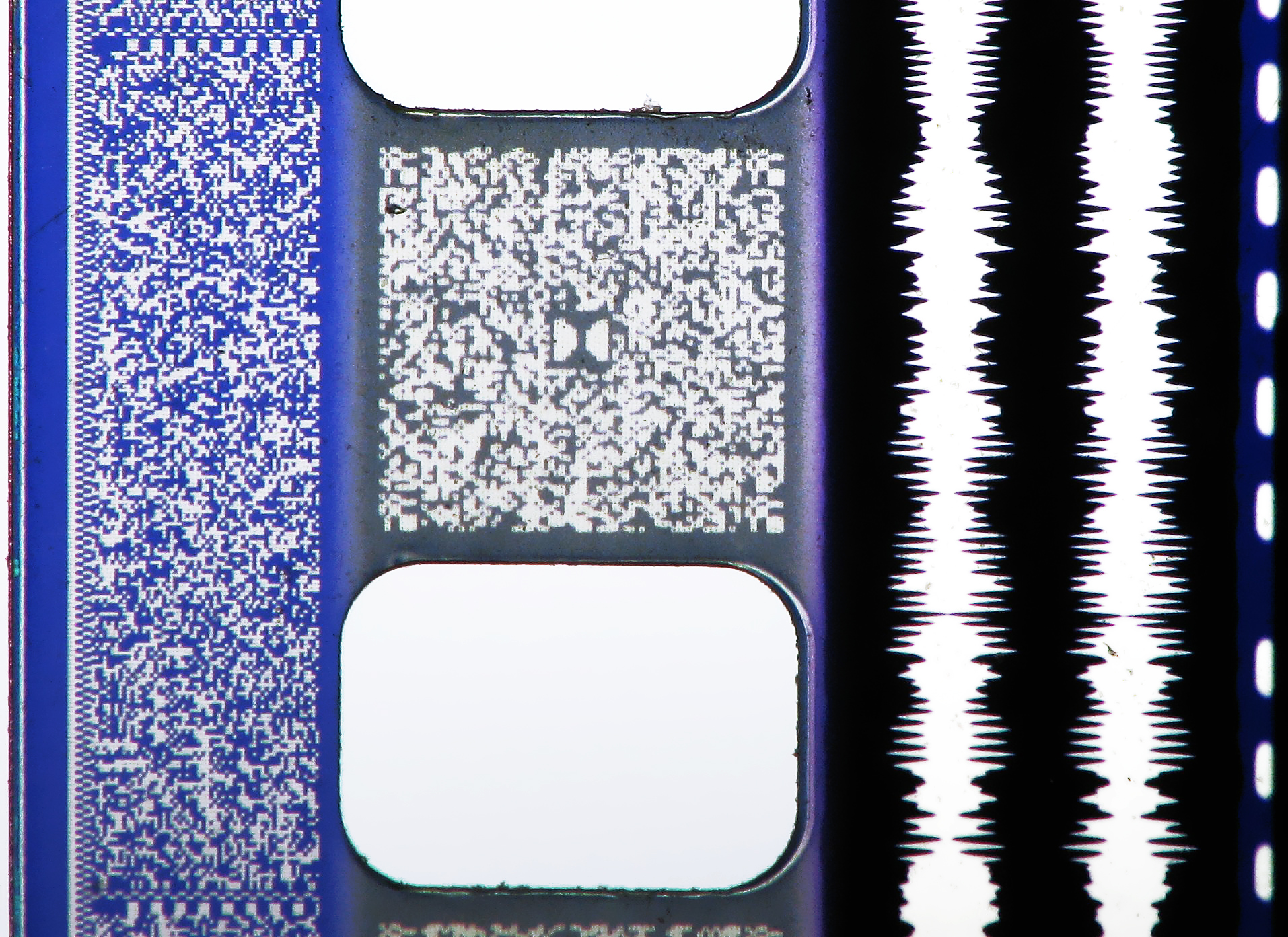
Edge of a 35-mm film print showing four types of soundtrack. The stereo optical sound strip is located on the right, with waveforms for left and right channels. To the far left is the SDDS digital track (blue area to the left of the sprocket holes), then the Dolby Digital (grey area between the sprocket holes labeled with the Dolby "Double-D" logo in the middle), and to the right of the analog optical sound is the DTS time code (the dashed line to the far right.)

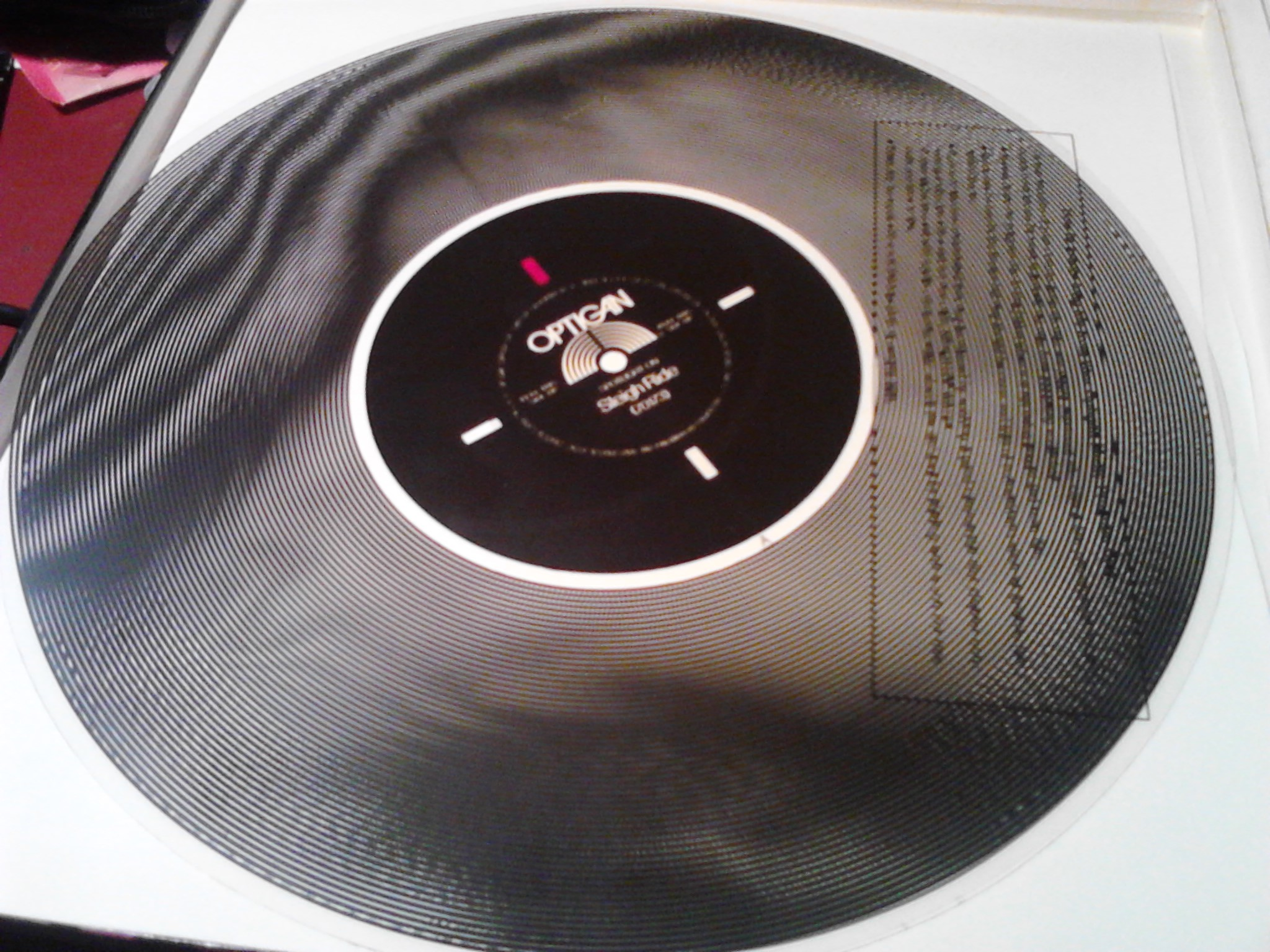
A transparent program disc imprinted with concentric optical sound tracks, used for the Optigan musical organ

Optical sound is a means of storing sound recordings on transparent film. Originally developed for military purposes, the technology first saw widespread use in the 1920s as a sound-on-film format for motion pictures. Optical sound eventually superseded all other sound film technologies until the advent of digital sound became the standard in cinema projection booths. Optical sound has also been used for multitrack recording and for creating effects in some musical synthesizers.

== 1914-1921: Naval and military use ==
Building on the principle first demonstrated by the Photophone of Alexander Graham Bell in 1880, optical sound was developed by several inventors with an interest in wireless communication through transmission of light, primarily for ship-to-ship use. The idea was that sound pulses could be converted into light pulses, beamed out from one ship and picked up by another, where the light pulses would then be reconverted into sound.

A pioneer in this technology was American physicist Theodore Case. While studying at Yale, Case became interested in using modulated light as a means of transmitting and recording speech. In 1914, he opened the Case Research Lab to experiment with the photoelectric properties of various materials, leading to the development of the Thallofide (short for thallium oxysulfide) Cell, a light-sensitive vacuum tube. The Thallofide tube was originally used by the United States Navy in a top secret ship-to-ship infrared signaling system developed at Case's lab with his assistant Earl Sponable. Case and Sponable's system was first tested off the shores of New Jersey in 1917, and attending the test was Thomas Edison, contracted by the Navy to evaluate new technologies. The test was a success, and the U.S. Navy used the system during and after World War I.

Contemporary with the work of Case and Sponable was Charles A. Hoxie's Pallophotophone (from Greek roots meaning "shaking light sound"), manufactured by General Electric (GE). Similar to the Case infrared system used by the Navy, the Pallophotophone was also intended for wireless communications at sea but was then adapted for recording speech. With GE's backing, Hoxie's invention was used in 1922–1923 to record then-Vice-president Calvin Coolidge and others for radio broadcasts.

The early work by Case, Sponable and Hoxie was instrumental in the development of sound-on-film systems for motion pictures during the 1920s.

== Film and radio ==
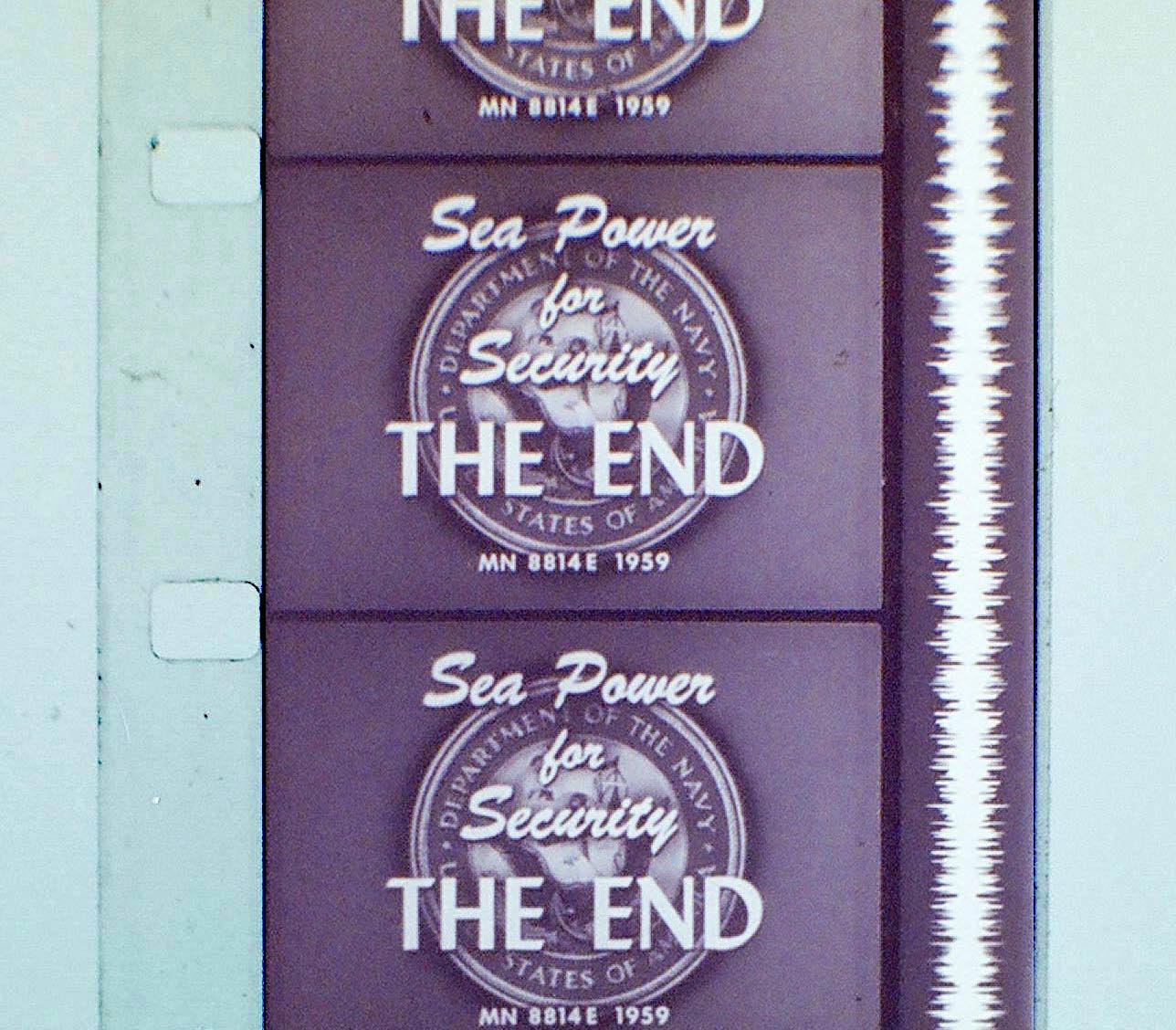
Example of a variable-area sound track on the right side of the frames on this strip of 16mm film. The width of the white area is proportional to the amplitude of the audio signal at each instant.

Most of the inventions which led to optical sound-on-film technology employed the use of an electric lamp, called an 'exciter', shining through a translucent waveform printed on the edge of a film strip. When the light shines through the film, it is read by a photo-sensitive material and fed through a processor, which converts the photovoltaic impulse into an electrical signal that is then amplified and converted into analog sound waves through a speaker.

Three types of optical sound-on-film technology emerged in the 1920s: Phonofilm, Photophone and Movietone. A fourth major contender for the sound film market - Warner Brothers' Vitaphone sound-on-disc system which synchronized large-size (16") phonographic records with a film's projector was used on early talkies, such as their' 1927 hit The Jazz Singer (which was marketed as being "all singing" though the talking was sporadic, used in only several isolated sequences), utilized Vitaphone discs, but by 1931, optical sound-on-film would supplant the separate sound-on-disc technology.

=== 1919-1926: Phonofilm ===
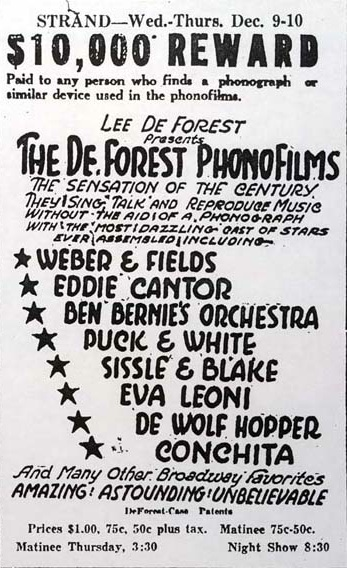
Newspaper ad for a 1925 presentation of De Forest Phonofilms shorts, touting their technological distinction: no phonograph.

After the war, Theodore Case and Earl I. Sponable collaborated with fellow wireless communications pioneer Lee de Forest, inventor of the Audion tube, to apply their optical sound system to motion pictures. De Forest had been granted general patents for a sound-on-film process in 1919, though it was the Case Research Lab's inventions that made de Forest's systems workable. Case Lab first converted an old silent-film projector into a recording device in 1922, using the projector's light to expose a soundtrack onto film. The process (which de Forest called Phonofilm) recorded sound as parallel lines of variable shades of gray, photographically transcribing the electrical waveforms from a microphone, which were translated back into sound waves when the movie was projected.

Case Lab fine-tuned the process with an invention called the 'Aeo-light' for use in sound cameras. During filming, audio signals modulated the Aeo-light to expose the film's audio directly inside the camera, streamlining Phonofilm's process for synchronizing a motion picture with its soundtrack. In 1924, Sponable focused on the design of these single-system cameras, in which both sound and picture were recorded on the same negative. He approached Bell & Howell to modify one of their cameras for his design, but the results were unsatisfactory. Later, the Wall Camera Corporation rebuilt the machine with improved results.

De Forest also worked with early newsreel maker, Freeman Harrison Owens, who by 1921, had developed his own patented sound camera, and spent time in Berlin working with the Tri-Ergon corporation and researching the development of European sound film systems. There, he met Finnish inventor, Eric Tigerstedt ("Finland's Thomas Edison"), who improved Phonofilm's amplification system to be audible in a large theater.

Phonofilm was used mainly to record stage performances, speeches, and musical acts in and around New York City, but Hollywood movie studios expressed little interest in the system. Since the Hollywood studios controlled the major theater chains, de Forest showed his films in independent theaters in a short-form series, akin to vaudeville, which included Max and Dave Fleischer's Song Car-Tunes. The Fleischers used the Phonofilm process for their animated shorts, which included the now-classic bouncing-ball gimmick.

In 1924, Owens parted ways with de Forest, and Case followed suit in 1925, because of de Forest's taking sole credit for Phonofilm. In August 1926, Warner Brothers introduced their Vitaphone sound-on-disc system, developed by Western Electric, with the John Barrymore film Don Juan. One month later, the Phonofilm Company filed for bankruptcy. Case and Sponable went on to implement their optical sound-on-film innovations as the Movietone sound system, and the UK rights to Phonofilm were bought up by theater chain owner Isadore Schlesinger, who used the technology to release short films of British music hall performers through 1929.

Left: Movietone track with variable density. Right: Variable area track

=== 1921-1927: Pallophotophone and Photophone ===
While Lee de Forest struggled to market Phonofilm, Charles A. Hoxie's Pallophotophone had success as an optical recording device through the support of General Electric. The Pallophotophone utilized the entire width of unsprocketed 35-mm Kodak monochrome film to record and replay multiple audio tracks. Unlike Phonofilm, this optical sound technology used a photoelectric process that captured audio waveforms generated by a vibrating mirror galvanometer, and was the first effective multitrack recording system, predating magnetic tape multitrack recorders by at least 20 years. From the early 1920s until the early 30s, GE broadcast over 1,000 Pallophotophone recordings from its Schenectady, New York radio station, WGY, including speeches by presidents Calvin Coolidge and Herbert Hoover, and inventor-businessmen Thomas Edison and Henry Ford.

By the mid-1920s, GE adapted Hoxie's invention for motion picture sound playback, subsequently marketed as a commercial product by then-GE subsidiary RCA as the 'RCA Photophone'. The first demonstrations of the Photophone, were given in 1926, and in 1927 a sound version (music plus sound effects only) of the silent film Wings, toured to a dozen specially equipped theaters.

=== 1926-1939: Movietone ===
While Hoxie's work found its way into national theaters through RCA, Theodore Case and Earl Sponable found a home with the Fox Film Corporation after leaving de Forest and Phonofilm. Case and Sponible's Movietone sound system made several modifications to the earlier Phonofilm system which they had helped create. One was moving the position of the projector's soundhead from above the picture head (as it had been in Phonofilm), to 14 1/2 inches (370 mm) below the picture head (close to the present-day standard). (Note: Offsetting the audio from the image is necessary because the film must be pulled past the projection lens with an intermittent motion in order to clearly project each frame, whereas the audio track must move smoothly through the soundhead or interruptions in the audio would be heard. For more detail see Movie camera.) Case also adopted the 24 frames-per-second speed for Movietone, bringing it in line with the speed already chosen for Warner Brothers' Vitaphone sound-on-disc system, establishing 24 frames-per-second as the de facto speed for all sound films, whether sound-on-disc or sound-on-film.

In 1926, Fox hired Sponible, bought Case's patents (they had already acquired Freeman Owens' and Tri-Ergon's), and mass-produced Case's Aeo-light for use in all Movietone News cameras from 1928 to 1939. These cameras recorded all Fox feature films during this period, beginning with F. W. Murnau's Sunrise: A Song of Two Humans (1927). As the first professionally produced feature with an optical soundtrack, it included mostly music and sound effects, with a very few unsynchronized words.

After 1931, Fox's feature film production moved to a two-machine system which Western Electric had developed from the RCA Photophone, with the advent of a light-valve invented by Edward C. Wente. In this system, one camera shot the frames, and a second lens-less "sound camera" served as an optical recorder, which was mechanically interlocked with the picture. Fox continued making Movietone Newsreels with single-system cameras due to their ease of mobility.

=== Optical sound on film to the present day ===
For half a century, cinema sound systems were licensed to either RCA or Western Electric, and motion picture producers elected to license one or the other, or even both. This continued until 1976, by which time optical sound recording had been converted to the Western Electric (dubbed "Westrex") stereo variable-area system.

Due to film grain and possible dust on the soundtrack, optical sound could be noisy or have crackling sounds, especially when projecting worn release prints. In low-volume sections (where the noise would be especially noticeable) noise reduction was originally performed either by partly masking the track or, in variable area recording, narrowing the width of the transparent oscillations. Later, electronic noise reduction was used (e.g. analog Dolby A).

As digital sound became the standard of sound reproduction in the 21st century, 35 and 70-mm films have increasingly included a digital version of the soundtrack on the edges of the film strip. Most films continue to be processed with both digital and analog soundtracks so they may be read by any projection systems in a movie theater.

== Optical sound in music production ==
After General Electric's Pallophotophone fell out of use in the early 1930s, optical multi-track recording did not have a resurgence for nearly three decades when high fidelity and stereophonic recordings became available commercially. Walt Disney made an attempt in 1940 when he began sound production for Fantasia with the Philadelphia Orchestra. Disney set up 33 microphones at the Academy of Music and ran these into eight independently operated mixing stations. The eight tracks were then recorded optically onto 35-mm film, with a ninth track adding tempo for Disney's artists to synchronize their animation to the soundtrack. Disney later mixed these nine tracks down to four for use with the Fantasound system that toured with the film to select theaters in 1941. As an early cinematic surround sound system, Disney had to refit each theatre with special Fantasound equipment that was later dismantled and put toward the war effort. In 1942 RKO Pictures remastered Fantasia for distribution with a monaural soundtrack. The film was remastered again for stereo in 1956 when moviehouses became equipped with duophonic sound systems.

== Optical sound used in musical instruments ==
A few musical instruments have been manufactured using optical sound for playback.

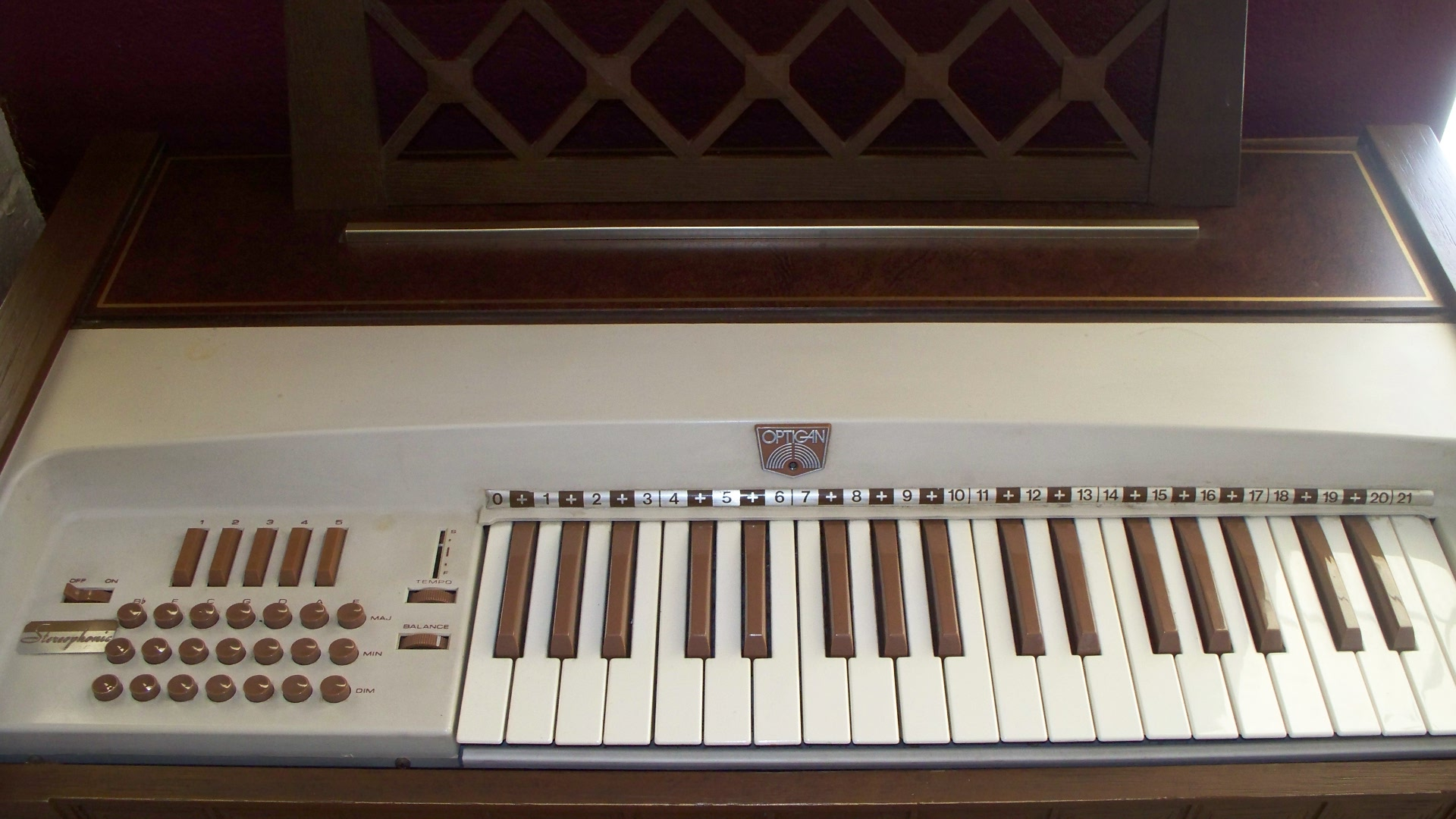
Keyboard overview of a model 35002 Optigan

In 1971 toy manufacturer Mattel released the Optigan (short for optical organ), an organ-like synthesizer whose sound library was stored on interchangeable 12" clear acetate "program discs". Each program disc was encoded with 57 concentric optical tracks that spun on a turntable inside the machine. The Optigan then translated the analog waveforms on each disc to an audio signal via an exciter lamp shone through the disc and onto a photoelectric cell. 37 of the program disc's tracks were single notes, and 21 featured chords in different keys and rhythm tracks much in the style of an electric chord organ or accordion. The Optigan came with a "Starter Set" of discs that featured standard instrument sounds and tempos. Other sounds were available through purchase of more disc packs. Mattel ceased production of the Optigan in 1976.

The Orchestron was a version of the Optigan built by Vako Synthesizers Inc., intended for professional use as an alternative to the Mellotron in the mid-1970s. The Orchestron featured improved recorded sounds over the Optigan, though many professional musicians of note have performed and recorded using Mattel's toy version.

== Preservation of vintage optical sound sources ==
Efforts have only recently been made to preserve early examples of optical sound. While none of GE's original Pallophotophones are known to exist, a few reels of Pallophotophone recordings of radio broadcasts have been found. Unlike movie film, these 35-mm reels do not contain sprockets. New players have been built using modern components to recover audio from old reels. Among the material on surviving reels is an early seven-note version of the NBC chimes, a broadcast of a high school basketball match (believed to be the world's second-oldest recording of a sports broadcast), and a historic 1929 recording of the 82-year-old Thomas Edison, with Henry Ford and President Herbert Hoover, speaking on a broadcast commemorating the 50th anniversary of the invention of the incandescent light bulb.

A resurgence in interest in the Optigan has led to a circuit of collectors trading program discs. Though originally marketed as a toy instrument, the Optigan was used by professional musicians to achieve unusual sounds, and the instrument made cameo appearances on recordings by Bruce Haack (1973), Alan Steward (1976), Steve Hackett (1980) and Devo (1981). In the 1990s the Optigan became popular as a vintage synthesizer, and samples of its sounds were released as digital software, making the sounds accessible to musicians not able to obtain the actual instrument. Since then, Optigan music has been used by numerous artists working in popular music, television, film, and is the featured instrument for the band Optiganally Yours.

== See also ==
- Audio-to-video synchronization
