= RCA Photophone =

Early film audio synchronization system

RCA Photophone Inc.
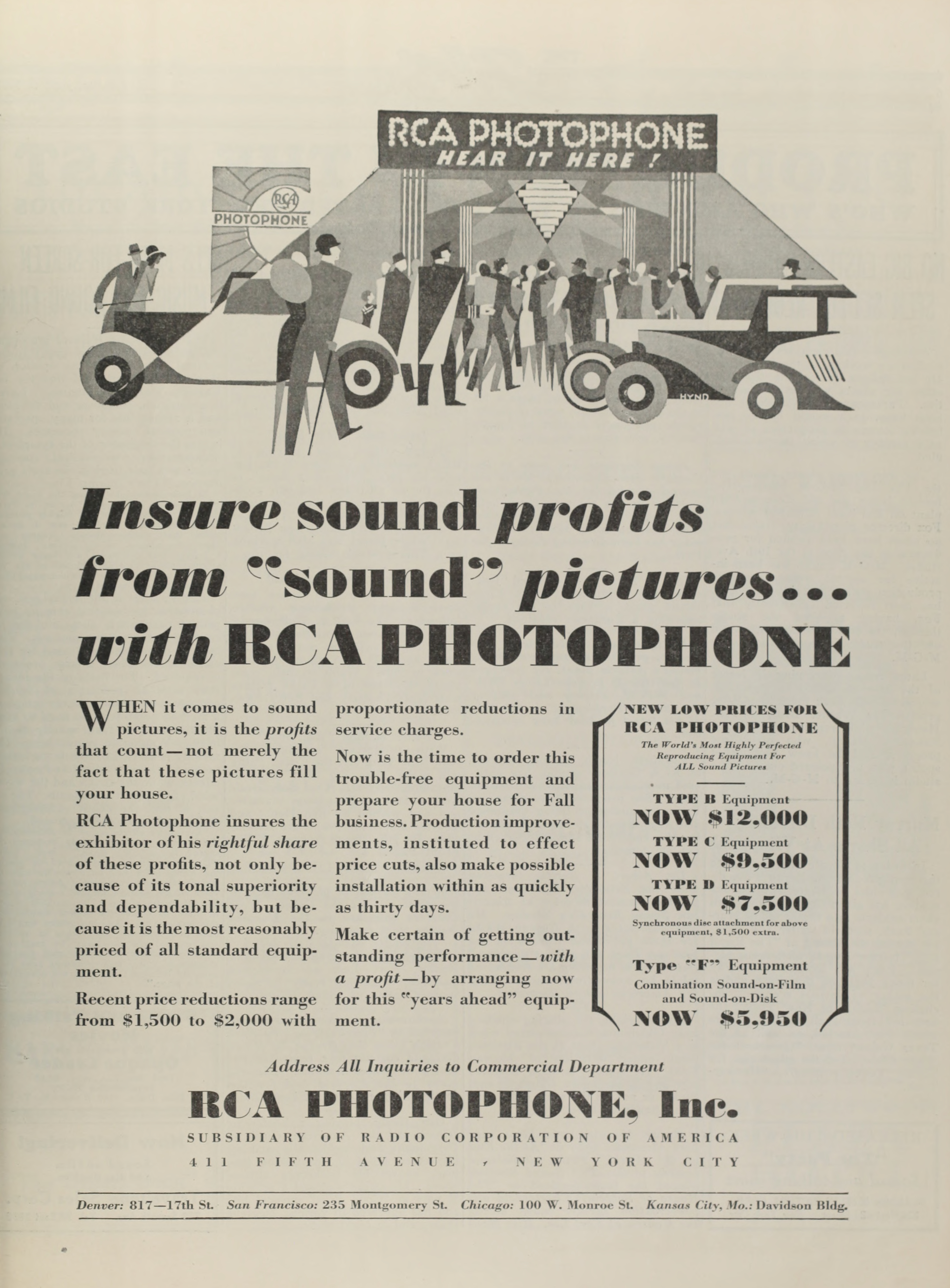
- Type: Subsidiary
- Founded: 1928
- Defunct: 1983
- Headquarters: 411 Fifth Avenue, New York City, New York
- Products: Sound-on-film technology
- Parent: Radio Corporation of America

RCA Photophone was the trade name given to one of four major competing technologies that emerged in the American film industry in the late 1920s for synchronizing electrically recorded audio to a motion picture image. RCA Photophone was an optical sound, "variable-area" film exposure system, in which the modulated area (width) corresponded to the waveform of the audio signal. The four other major technologies were the Warner Bros. Vitaphone sound-on-disc system, as well as three "variable-density" sound-on-film systems, Lee De Forest's Phonofilm, and Fox-Case's Movietone, and the German system Tri-Ergon.

When Joseph P. Kennedy and other investors merged Film Booking Offices of America (FBO) with the Keith-Albee-Orpheum theater chain and Radio Corporation of America; the resulting movie studio RKO Radio Pictures used RCA Photophone as its primary sound system. In March 1929, RKO released Syncopation, the first live-recorded film made with RCA Photophone.

== History and licensing ==
In the early years following World War I, Charles A. Hoxie working at General Electric (GE) developed a photographic film recorder, initially to record transoceanic wireless telegraphy signals. However, this recorder was later adapted for recording speech and was used in 1921 to record speeches by President Calvin Coolidge and others which were broadcast over Station WGY (Schenectady). This recorder was called the Pallophotophone.

In 1925, GE began a program to develop commercial sound-on-film equipment based on Hoxie's work. Unlike the Phonofilm and Movietone systems in which the audio modulated the intensity of a recording lamp which exposed the soundtrack, thus creating a variable-density track, the GE system employed a fast-acting mirror galvanometer to create a variable-area soundtrack. A number of demonstrations of this system, now known as Photophone, were given in 1926 and 1927. The first public screenings with this system were of a sound version (music plus sound effects only) of the silent film Wings which was exhibited as a road-show in around a dozen specially equipped theatres during 1927.

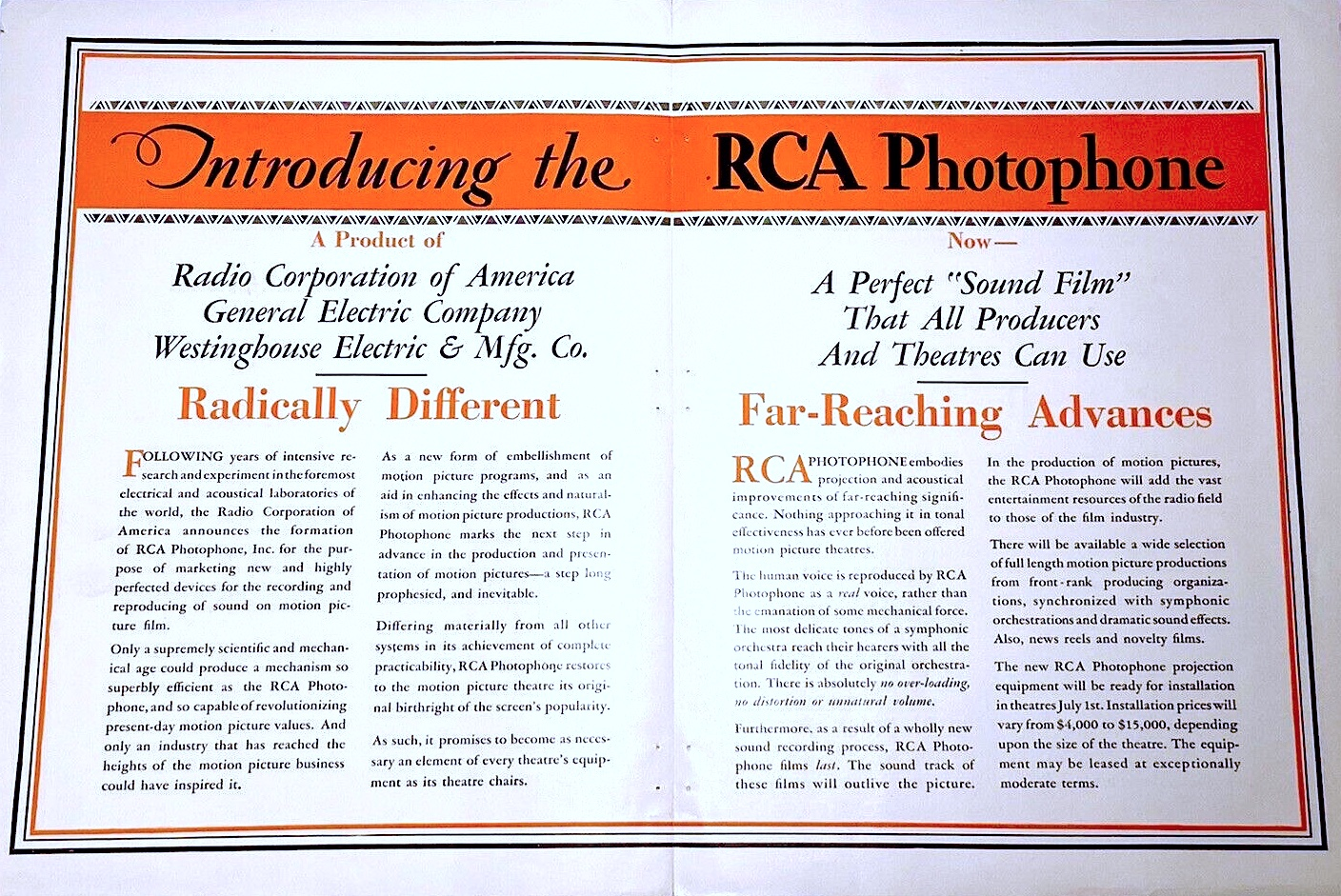
Magazine ad insert introducing RCA Photophone, 1928

In April 1928, RCA Photophone Inc. was created as a subsidiary of RCA (itself then a GE subsidiary) to commercially exploit the Photophone system. David Sarnoff was president and a member of the board of directors. The RCA system continued to use the galvanometer until the 1970s, when it became technically obsolete. The Western Electric system continued to use the light valve, and, under successor ownership, is still used to this day.

For nearly half a century, motion picture sound systems were licensed, with two major licensors in North America, RCA and Western Electric (Northern Electric, in Canada), which licensed their principal sound element (original track negative) recording systems on a non-exclusive basis. In general, motion picture producers elected to license one or the other. In a few cases, where mergers had occurred, a producer might be licensed for both. For many years, it was customary to "brand" a film with its sound system, variously as "RCA Sound Recording", "Western Electric Recording", or similar brands, often including the corporate logo of the licensor (Meatball for RCA; The Voice of Action for Western Electric; Li Westrex for the post-1956 divestiture of Western Electric under Litton Industries' ownership). Such branding ceased in about 1976, particularly after nearly all optical sound recording (for release prints) had been converted to Westrex's stereo variable-area system from RCA's and Westrex's mono systems, although there were a few examples of such branding thereafter (mainly Westrex.)

Many years later, the Photophone trademark would be reused by the Western Electric/Westrex stereo variable-area system, after both the Western Electric and Westrex trademarks became unavailable due to corporate asset sales by the disintegrating Bell System, but the Western Electric/Westrex stereo variable-area system continued to be marketed by a successor, and it is still serviced and supported to this day, although it is no longer branded as Photophone.

== Comparison of (mono) variable-area and variable-density ==
Left: Movietone track with variable density. Right: Photophone variable area track.

Although variable-density sound system recording is usually associated with Western Electric and variable-area sound system recording is usually associated with RCA, these relationships are not cast into stone.

Both variable-area systems and variable-density systems were marketed by both RCA and Western Electric, the Western Electric light valve being capable of producing either variable-density or variable-area depending on which ribbon axis was parallel to the film motion, and the RCA galvanometer was capable of producing either variable-area or variable-density depending upon the particulars of the optical system.

Roughly equal measured and perceived quality was available from both systems and from both manufacturers. Neither recording system nor manufacturer was clearly superior to the other, except where specific customer end-to-end processes made one system/manufacturer more consistently superior to the other system/manufacturer.

Variable-density was preferred for Technicolor sound prints as this process utilized a silver gray-scale "key" record, thereby creating a CMYK color image, and the soundtrack was also a silver gray-scale record, which greatly facilitated variable-density (and made variable-area rather difficult). The "key" record was deleted from most Technicolor prints after 1944, thereby creating a CMY color image, but Technicolor's strong preference for variable-density continued long thereafter.

Variable-density was finally abandoned as customer preferences for "dual-bilateral" variable-area soundtracks emerged in the late 1950s. This required changes to some laboratory processing and quality controls, but the real reason for variable-density's demise was yet to come.

== Stereo variable-area ==
In the early-1970s, there was renewed interest in improving the quality of optical film soundtracks.

As a consequence by the early 1970s several individuals and organizations were considering improvements to the dated technical standards used for optical sound on 35mm film. In particular both Dolby Laboratories and Kodak were investigating the use of Dolby noise reduction on optical soundtracks.

In the mid-1970s, Westrex Corp. (a wholly owned subsidiary of Litton Industries since 1956, and the successor to Western Electric's cinema sound business unit) re-introduced the ca. 1938 "four ribbon" light valve, and the ca. 1947 RA-1231 sound recorder.

When originally introduced in 1947, the RA-1231 could be configured as a mono 35mm variable-density or variable-area recorder, or a mono 16mm variable-density or variable-area recorder, at the customer's option. However its basic electro-optical arrangement could also be used to create a time-aligned, two-channel variable-area version, and this then became the industry standard device for recording stereo variable-area optical soundtracks.

Variable-density's fate was then sealed as these stereo optical sound prints (as contrasted with stereo magnetic sound prints or mono optical sound prints) became a marketing imperative.

When encoded utilizing Dolby Stereo (itself originally being in part licensed from Sansui), the discrete L and R channels of Westrex's stereo variable-area system were renamed "Left Total" and "Right Total", and when decoded utilizing Dolby's Cinema Processor these produced the L, C, R and S sound image first commonly used by Fox's CinemaScope magnetic stereo system in 1953.

Stereo optical sound prints are compatible with films with any aspect ratio and with normal print film stocks with KS-type film perforations, whereas stereo magnetic sound prints require film stocks with the narrower CS-type film perforations. Film with CS-type perforations can only be run on a projector fitted with special narrow-toothed sprockets or permanent damage will be done to the film. An alternative is LaVezzi's VKF ("Very Kind to Film") sprockets, which perform optimally on KS- as well as CS-perforated prints. Stereo variable-area, therefore, provided for the first time stereo film prints of any aspect ratio (1.37:1/Academy through 2.35:1/CinemaScope, inclusive) which could be run without damage on any normal 35mm cinema projector.

Nearly all original track negatives (OTNs) are now produced as stereo variable-area, and the former Western Electric (Westrex) system has been renamed Photophone and has become the de facto standard for analogue optical soundtracks, world-wide.

The fully implemented case of stereo variable-area (i.e., 4-2-4 encoding/decoding) produces a stereo 3.1 track.

The partially degenerate case of stereo variable-area (i.e., no 4-2-4 encoding/decoding, but discrete left total/left and right total/right) produces a stereo 2.0 track.

The fully degenerate case of stereo variable-area (i.e., no 4-2-4 encoding/decoding, and left total/left equal to right total/right) produces a conventional "dual-bilateral" mono 1.0 track.

== RCA Photophone system abandoned – Westrex (stereo) variable-area system renamed Photophone ==
Once the ability to record stereo tracks became a commercial imperative for sound-transfer facilities, the RCA system was abandoned, as it was incapable of producing time-aligned stereo sound negatives. Whereas the Western Electric/Westrex recorders with the ca. 1938 4-ribbon light valve (RA-1231, e.g., but not RA-1231A) were inherently capable of producing time-aligned sound negatives.

The Westrex system was renamed Photophone after the Western Electric and Westrex registered trademarks were sold by AT&T and Litton Industries, respectively, to others, for uses other than cinema sound systems.

Renaming the Westrex system to Photophone was facilitated by the demise of RCA's cinema sound business unit, by the hand of General Electric, RCA's acquirer, and by its failure to protect the Photophone trademark.

The Westrex system, briefly renamed Photophone, is still in use, with more than 100 systems currently in active service, world-wide. Some users, including Disney and Warner Bros., have multiple systems. The RCA system is essentially defunct.

The Westrex system also has the capability of producing a DTS time-code track along with its native stereo variable-area tracks, or DTS time-code alone for use with 70mm and "special venue" prints.

== Photophone brand abandoned ==
The re-use of the Photophone brand was relatively short-lived. After the closure of the immediate successor to Litton, the RA-1231 recorder and its supporting electronics were taken over by yet another successor.

== See also ==
- Joseph Tykociński-Tykociner
- List of film formats
- List of early sound feature films (1926–1929)
- Movietone
- Pallophotophone
- Phonofilm
- Photokinema
- Sound film
- Sound-on-disc
- Vitaphone
