= Gods of Youth =

2000 film by Kate Twa

- Official film poster
- Directed by: Kate Twa
- Screenplay by: Kate Twa
- Produced by: Kate Twa; Ronan Reinart
- Starring: James Pizzinato; Joey Pierce; Anthony Shim; Ashley Whillans; Lynda Boyd; Grace Park; William MacDonald; J. R. Bourne
- Cinematography: Ronan Reinart
- Edited by: Ronan Reinart
- Music by: Tyler Weiss; Ben Lumsden
- Production companies: Mutant Films; Cucumber Satellite Theatre & Film Society
- Distributed by: Novastar Corporation & Mutant Films Inc.
- Release date: 2000
- Running time: 87 minutes
- Country: Canada
- Language: English

Gods of Youth (original title: Candyland) is a drama film written, directed and produced by Kate Twa. Other working titles were Meth, and Run Rabbit Run.

== Plot ==
Following the next few days of two drug users that meet by coincidence, film school student Paul Moon (Anthony Shim) and meth making Jay King (Joey Pierce) who also deals ecstasy and cocaine, with Briana Clark (Ashley Whillans) (Paul's film school colleague), spiral into self-destructive and havoc wreaking misadventures before tragically succumbing to the paranoia inducing effects of meth.

== Cast ==
- James Pizzinato as Terry King
- Joey Pierce as Jay King
- Anthony Shim as Paul Moon
- Ashley Whillans as Briana Clark
- Jordana Largy as Niky Jordan
- Lynda Boyd as Theresa King
- Grace Park as Hanna Moon
- William MacDonald as Babydoll
- J. R. Bourne as Joe Clark

== Production ==
Preproduction began at least one year before principal photography, as producers and actors interviewed "police officers, addicts, ex-addicts, hospice workers, parole officers, psychiatrists, and councillors" about the attraction and effects of the drug crystal methamphetamine.

The film was then shot over a one-year period, with actors delivering most of their dialogue as improvisation.

Completion financing was secured from Telefilm Canada in 2010, and the final version was completed in January 2011.

== Premieres ==
Film drafts were screened to critical acclaim at the Cinefest Sudbury International Film Festival on September 17, 2008, The Beverly Hills International Film Festival on April 1, 2009, and the Rendezvous with Madness Film Festival (Toronto) on November 10, 2011. Its first major release was its premiere on the Super Channel on February 16, 2012, and was broadcast in rotation until April 15, 2012. It was available on Super Channel's digital demand.
