= Nathaniel Geary =

Canadian filmmaker and restaurateur

Nathaniel Geary is a Canadian filmmaker and restaurateur from Vancouver, British Columbia, whose feature film debut On the Corner won the awards for Best Western Canadian Film at the 2003 Vancouver International Film Festival, and Best Canadian Film at the 2003 Whistler Film Festival.

He received a Vancouver Film Critics Circle nomination for Best Director of a Canadian Film at the Vancouver Film Critics Circle Awards 2003.

He also directed the short films Keys to Kingdoms (1999), Gold! Gold! Gold! (2008) and Psych Out (2009).

He later left filmmaking, launching the pizza restaurant Don't Argue! with his wife Anna de Courcy. The restaurant closed in 2019, before reopening in 2024 as a slice shop inside Caffé Soccavo, under new ownership but with Geary's participation.
