= Chronic Town (film) =

- Directed by: Tom Hines
- Written by: Michael Kamsky
- Produced by: Lauri LaBeau; David Scharf
- Starring: JR Bourne
- Cinematography: Yiannis Samaras
- Edited by: Clay Zimmerman
- Music by: Ryan Raddatz
- Production company: Grey Jumper Prods.
- Release date: 2008
- Running time: 96 minutes 99 minutes
- Country: United States
- Language: English

Chronic Town is a 2008 American drama film written by Michael Kamsky, directed by Tom Hines and starring JR Bourne.

== Cast ==
- JR Bourne as Truman
- Emily Wagner as Eleanor
- Jeffrey Scott Jensen as Faraday
- Alice Drummond as Elizabeth
- Dan Butler as "Blow Job"
- Paul Dooley as Eleanor's Father
- Garry Marshall as The Doctor
- Lin Shaye as Nurse
- Stacy Edwards as Emily
- Robert Peters as Newton
- Ian Gregory as Max
- Christine Lakin as Kelly
- Rowan Joseph as Roger
- Chris Wynne as Peter

== Reception ==
Robert Koehler of Variety gave the film a positive review, writing that it "exudes observed experience."

Justin Lowe of The Hollywood Reporter also gave the film a positive review and wrote, "With biting humor and refreshing humanism, Hines takes a cold-eyed look at credible individuals struggling with addiction and dysfunction."
