= Stuck (2002 film) =

- Directed by: Lindsay Bourne
- Written by: Lindsay Bourne
- Produced by: Lily Hui
- Starring: Amanda Tapping; JR Bourne; Fred Henderson; Courtney Kramer
- Music by: J. Douglass Dodd
- Release date: January 10, 2002 (Canada)
- Running time: 96 minutes
- Country: Canada
- Language: English
- Budget: Can$15,000 (Estimated)

Stuck is a 2002 Canadian feature-length video drama film written and directed by Lindsay Bourne. It features Amanda Tapping as Liz, JR Bourne as Bernie, Fred Henderson as Gordon, and Courtney Kramer as Cindy.

== Synopsis ==
When four people from very different backgrounds find themselves stuck in an elevator, they find themselves confronting each other and themselves. Will they emerge with their views on the world, others and themselves changed or will the stay stuck in what they believe and in their prejudices?

== Cast ==
- Amanda Tapping as Liz
- JR Bourne as Bernie
- Fred Henderson as Gordon
- Courtney Kramer as Cindy
