= Vancouver Film Critics Circle Awards 2003 =

Annual Canadian film awards ceremony

4th VFCC Awards

2 February 2004

Best Film:
Lost in Translation

Best Canadian Film:
Les invasions barbares

The 4th Vancouver Film Critics Circle Awards, honoring the best in filmmaking in 2003, were given on 2 February 2004.

== Winners ==
=== International ===
- Best Actor:
  - Sean Penn - Mystic River
- Best Actress:
  - Charlize Theron - Monster
- Best Director:
  - Peter Jackson - The Lord of the Rings: The Return of the King
- Best Film:
  - Lost in Translation
- Best Foreign Language Film:
  - Cidade de Deus (City of God), Brazil
- Best Supporting Actor:
  - Alec Baldwin - The Cooler
- Best Supporting Actress:
  - Patricia Clarkson - Pieces of April

=== Canadian ===
- Best Actor:
  - Philip Seymour Hoffman - Owning Mahowny
- Best Actress:
  - Sarah Polley - My Life Without Me
- Best Director:
  - Denys Arcand - The Barbarian Invasions
- Best Film:
  - The Barbarian Invasions (Les invasions barbares)
- Best Supporting Actor:
  - JR Bourne - On the Corner
- Best Supporting Actress:
  - Rebecca Harker - Moving Malcolm
