= Dying at Grace =

- Directed by: Allan King
- Produced by: Allan King
- Cinematography: Peter Walker
- Edited by: Nick Hector
- Music by: Bill Thompson
- Production company: Allan King Associates
- Release date: September 8, 2003 (TIFF)
- Running time: 148 minutes
- Country: Canada
- Language: English

Dying at Grace is a Canadian documentary film, directed by Allan King and released in 2003. The film profiles a group of patients in palliative care at Toronto Grace Health Centre in Toronto, Ontario, exploring their thoughts and feelings on their imminent deaths.

The film premiered at the 2003 Toronto International Film Festival, then played at The Museum of Modern Art in New York, Berlinale, Leipzig, Sydney, Singapore, Taipei, Prague, Phoenix, Vancouver, and Montreal film festivals. It was broadcast on television by TVOntario in February 2004.

The film was named to TIFF's annual year-end Canada's Top Ten list for 2003, and won the Donald Brittain Award for best television documentary on a social or political topic and best documentary film editing at the 19th Gemini Awards in 2004.

== Reception ==
The film was well received attaining a 95% Fresh rating at rottentomatoes.com. It was described as "a masterpiece" by POV Magazine's John Haslett Cuff. Eye Weekly's Adam Nayman gave it five stars calling it "Wrenching and magnificent." Liam Lacey of the Globe and Mail gave it four out of four stars declaring it “one of the most powerful Canadian documentaries in a long time“. The New York Times's Jeannette Catsoulis gave it 4.5 stars out of 5 describing it as "a potent reminder of the fearful gap between fiction and reality." TIFF programmer Stacey Donan described the film as "one of the best films ever made in this country". Dying at Grace was added the Criterion Collection in 2010.
