= On the Corner (film) =

2003 Canadian film

- Directed by: Nathaniel Geary
- Written by: Nathaniel Geary
- Produced by: Wendy Hyman
- Starring: Alex Rice; Simon Baker; JR Bourne
- Cinematography: Brian Johnson
- Edited by: Michael Brockington
- Music by: Michael Campitelli
- Production company: Big Sky Pictures
- Distributed by: On the Corner Productions
- Release date: September 9, 2003 (TIFF)
- Running time: 95 minutes
- Country: Canada
- Language: English

On the Corner is a Canadian drama film, directed by Nathaniel Geary and released in 2003. Set in the Downtown Eastside neighbourhood of Vancouver, British Columbia, the film stars Alex Rice and Simon Baker as Angel and Randy Henry, a brother and sister struggling with poverty and drug addiction.

The film premiered at the 2003 Toronto International Film Festival.

== Production ==
The film's cast also includes JR Bourne, Robert Harper, Katharine Isabelle, Brent Stait, Gordon Tootoosis, Margo Kane and Tina Keeper.

Geary based the film's screenplay in part on his own experiences as a social worker helping sex workers and people who use drugs in the neighbourhood.

Baker's agent sent a clip of Baker's performance in the film to director Ron Howard, leading to Baker being cast as Honesco in the film The Missing without having to audition.

== Awards ==
At the 2003 Vancouver International Film Festival, On the Corner won the award for Best Western Canadian Film. It was named Best Canadian Film at the 2003 Whistler Film Festival.

The film was named to TIFF's annual year-end Canada's Top Ten list for 2003.

Bourne won the Vancouver Film Critics Circle Award for Best Supporting Actor in a Canadian Film at the Vancouver Film Critics Circle Awards 2003.
