= Jacqueline Kalimunda =

- Born: 1974 (age 51–52); Kigali, Rwanda.
- Occupations: film producer . documentary maker . director and writer.

Jacqueline Kalimunda (born 1974) is a Rwandan film producer, documentary maker, director and writer.

== Biography ==
Jaqueline Kalimunda was born in Kigali, Rwanda. She has lived in Kenya, Madagascar, and England before moving to France. While in school, Kalimunda studied management alongside African history. She specialized in film production and distribution. Kalimunda was trained as an editor and used this skill to work on documentaries and television films. She dedicates herself to telling strong original stories and themes in her work.

== Filmography ==
In 2002, she wrote, directed and co-produced her first film, the 23 minute Histoire de tresses (About Braids), which was voted best short film at the 2003 Zanzibar International Film Festival. The short film was also distributed in the UK by the British Film Institute and the US by the New York African Film festival. The film depicts a story between a young woman and a talented African hair-braider. The woman requests the hair-braider to recreate an unconventional style of hair braiding.

The documentary Homeland is the conclusion of a long project started when she was researching images of Rwanda with historians Jean-Pierre Chrétien and Hélène d’Almeida-Topor. For this work, Jacqueline Kalimunda unveiled 80 years of unpublished film archives on Rwanda. The film was shown at the 2007 Fespaco in Ouagadougou.

In 2007 and 2008, Jacqueline Kalimunda co-directed the first and second season of TV series Imagine Afrika, broadcast in 35 African countries on public TV channels in English, French, Swahili, Zulu, Portuguese and other languages. Then she directed in coproduction with Canal Plus Horizon the feature film High Life broadcast in 2011.

An alumnus of the Berlinale Talent Campus, Jacqueline Kalimunda produced and directed in 2012 Burning Down, a Focus Features Africa First short movie with Eriq Ebouaney (Brian de Palma's Femme fatale, Raoul Peck's Lumumba) and Cyril Guei.

In 2016 Kalimunda wrote and directed Floris, a documentary in the Kinyarwanda language.

Year	Title
2002	About Braids
2005	Homeland
2007	Imagine Afrika - Season 1
2008	Imagine Afrika - Season 2
2009	High Life/Lala & The Gaous
