= JR Bourne =

Canadian actor (born 1970)

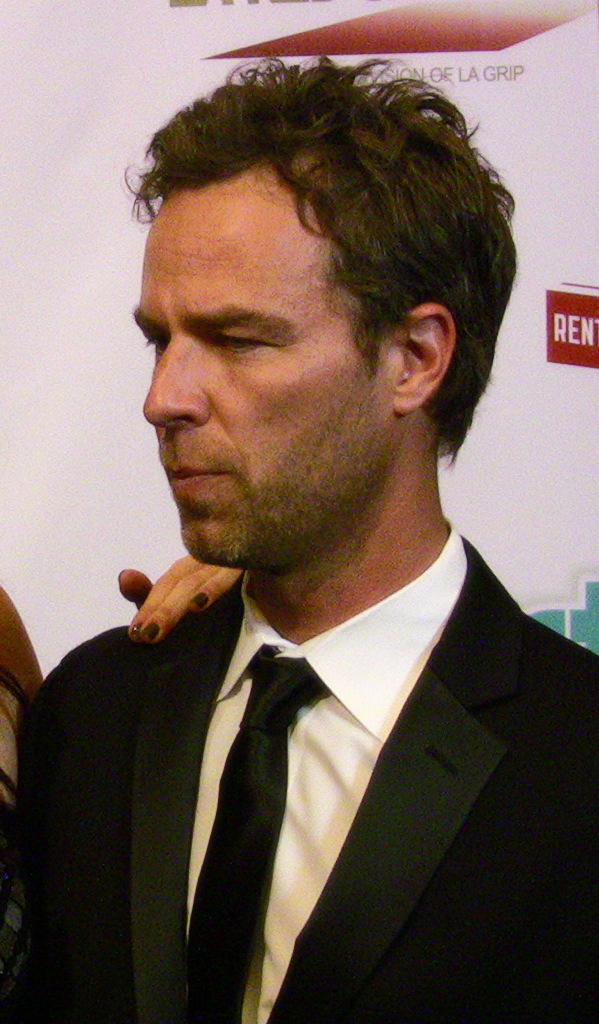
- Bourne, 2011
- Born: David Bourne; April 8, 1970 (age 56); Toronto, Ontario, Canada
- Occupation: Actor
- Years active: 1994–present

David Bourne (born April 8, 1970), known professionally as JR Bourne, is a Canadian actor. After appearing in many films and television series, Bourne's first major breakthrough was the Showtime series Stargate SG-1 (1998–2000). He achieved further prominence for his role as Chris Argent in the MTV supernatural series Teen Wolf (2011–2017).

== Early life ==
Bourne was born on April 8, 1970, in Toronto, Ontario, and grew up in Barbados. He has an older sister. He had an interest in acting since the age of 10, but it was not until he was around the age of 24 that he realized that it would be a way for him to make a living.

== Career ==
Bourne first appeared in the action film Jungleground (1995). He subsequently appeared in many television series. His first major television role was as Martouf / Lantash on the Showtime science fiction adventure Stargate SG-1 (1998–2000).

Bourne has won two Vancouver Film Critics Circle Awards for Best Supporting Actor in a Canadian Film: for On the Corner in 2004 and Everything's Gone Green in 2007. He also received nominations for Best Supporting Performance by a Male in a Feature Length Drama for both films at the Leo Awards. In the following year, he was cast as CIA agent Edwards on the science fiction drama Fringe (2009–2011). Bourne then appeared in the second season of the ABC series Revenge.

He portrayed Chris Argent on all six seasons of the supernatural drama series Teen Wolf (2011–2017) and was part of the main cast in the final season. Bourne has also appeared as a series regular on the mystery drama Somewhere Between (2017), and science fiction drama The 100 (2019–2020).

In September 2021, it was announced that a reunion film for 2011 Teen Wolf television series had been ordered by Paramount+, with Jeff Davis returning as a screenwriter and executive producer for the film. The majority of the original cast members, including Bourne, reprised their roles. The film was released on January 26, 2023.

== Charity work ==
Bourne's niece was born with the genetic disorder cystic fibrosis, and he has long been a champion of the Cystic Fibrosis Foundation. In an interview with MTV News, Bourne revealed that he had come to realize back when he had first started doing conventions for Teen Wolf that they were perfect platforms with which to raise money and awareness for the foundation.

== Filmography ==
=== Film ===
Year	Title	Role
1995	Jungleground	Odin
1995	The Final Goal	Joseph
1996	Past Perfect	Doorman
2001	Sea	Joel
2001	Antitrust	Building 21 guard
2001	Josie and the Pussycats	Shop owner
2001	Exiles In Paradise	Steve
2001	Thir13en Ghosts	Benjamin Moss
2002	Stuck	Bernie
2002	Cover Story	Mark Peck
2003	The Favourite Game	Leo
2003	On the Corner	Cliffie
2004	The Truth About Miranda	Hammond
2004	Ginger Snaps Back: The Beginning	James
2005	The Exorcism of Emily Rose	Ray
2005	Six Figures	Warner
2005	The Score	Michael Stockholder
2005	Severed: Forest of the Dead	Carter
2005	The Zero Sum	Fence
2006	Everything's Gone Green	Bryce
2006	The Butterfly Effect 2	Malcolm Williams
2006	Sisters	Larry Franklin
2006	Unnatural & Accidental	Pathologist
2008	Chronic Town	Truman
2008	Gods of Youth	Brian Clark
2010	Alleged	George Rappleyea
2011	Fly Away	Peter
2011	Little Birds	John Gretton
2012	Brake	Henry Shaw
2017	Frazier Park Recut	Himself
2018	Hospitality	Zane Hirsch
2023	Teen Wolf: The Movie	Chris Argent

=== Television ===
Year	Title	Role	Notes
1995	Strange Luck	Borden	Episode: "The Box"
1995–1996	Side Effects	Dino Burgess	Guest role; 2 episodes
1996	The Sentinel	Kendrick	Episode: "Out of the Past"
1996	Two	British Agent Riddley	Episode: "Armies of the Night"
1996	Millennium	Carl Nearman	Episode: "The Judge"
1996–1997	Madison	Elliot	Recurring role
1997	The Right Connections	Douglas Freeman	Television film
1998	The Inspectors	Dwayne	Television film
1998	Futuresport	Eric Sythe	Television film
1998	The Crow: Stairway to Heaven	Shane Gant	Episode: "Like It's 1999"
1998	Viper	Seth Kincaid	Episode: "The Really Real Reenactment"
1998–2000, 2006	Stargate SG-1	Martouf / Lantash	Recurring role
1999	Dead Man's Gun	Frank Noyce	Episode: "The Vine"
1999	Aftershock: Earthquake in New York	Joshua Bingham	Television mini-series
2000	Higher Ground	Jason	Episode: "The Kids Stay in the Picture"
2000	The Outer Limits	Dell Tinker	Episode: "Zig Zag"
2000	Call of the Wild	Andrew Morton	Episode: "Foxfire"
2000–2001	Beggars and Choosers	Matt Paladin	Guest role; 2 episodes
2001	Big Sound	Bobby Talisman	Guest role; 2 episodes
2001	Return to Cabin by the Lake	J.C. Reddick	Television film
2002	Jeremiah	Steen	Episode: "The Touch"
2002	Breaking News	Keith	Episode: "Rachel Glass and the No Good, Very Bad Day"
2003	Andromeda	Fleet Marshall William Atatürk	Guest role; 2 episodes
2003	Word of Honor	Mr. Picard	Television film
2004	Century City	Ricky	Episode: "Pilot"
2004	Perfect Romance	Rick Meadows	Television film
2004–2005	Cold Squad	Paul Deeds	Recurring role
2005	Selling Innocence	Malcolm Lowe	Television film
2006	Godiva's	Sam	Recurring role
2006	The Dead Zone	Nathan Carter	Episode: "Vortex"
2007	Superstorm	Lance Resnick	Television mini-series
2007	CSI: Miami	Stan Keeler	Episode: "Man Down"
2007	CSI: Crime Scene Investigation	Jerome Kessler	Episode: "The Good, the Bad and the Dominatrix"
2007	24	CTU Agent Johnson	Episode: "Day 6: 8:00 p.m.–9:00 p.m."
2007	NCIS	Metro Detective Marshall Collins	Episode: "Lost & Found"
2008	The Mentalist	Jeremy Hale	Episode: "Seeing Red"
2008	Odysseus: Voyage to the Underworld	Perimedes	Television film; originally titled Odysseus & the Isle of Mists
2008	The Lost Treasure of the Grand Canyon	Marco Langford	Television film
2009–2011	Fringe	CIA Agent Edwards	Guest role; 2 episodes
2010	NCIS: Los Angeles	Dallas	Guest role; 2 episode
2010	Smallville	Dr. Bernard Chisholm	Episode: "Conspiracy"
2010	Cold Case	Matt Doherty	Episode: "Shattered"
2011–2015	Suits	Samuel Tull	Guest role; 2 episodes
2011–2012	The Secret Circle	Isaac	Recurring role
2011	Flashpoint	Dan Lefebvre	Episode: "Wild Card"
2011–2017	Teen Wolf	Chris Argent	Recurring role (seasons 1–5); main role (season 6)
2012–2013	Revenge	Kenny Ryan	Recurring role
2014	Grand Theft Auto: Give Me Liberty	Detective Atkinson	Television film
2015	UnREAL	Bill DeYoung	Guest role
2015	Arrow	Jeremy Tell / Double Down	Episode: "Restoration"
2015	The Preacher's Sin	Evan Tanning	Television film; also known as A Husband's Confession
2015	Satisfaction	Barry	Guest role
2016	Outcast	Luke Masters	Episode: "All Alone Now"
2016	Prototype	Ethan Kale	Television film
2016	Beat Bugs	The Man	Episode: "Why Don't We Do It on the Road"; voice role
2016	Her Dark Past	Peter	Television film
2017	Somewhere Between	Tom Price	Main role
2018	Falling Water	Thomas Dolan	Recurring role
2019–2020	The 100	Russell Lightbourne VII	Recurring role (season 6)
2019–2020	The 100	Malachi / Sheidheda	Main role (season 7)
2021–2023	Mayans M.C.	Isaac Packer	Recurring role (season 3); guest role (season 4); main role (season 5)
2021	On the Verge	Adam	Recurring role

== Accolades ==
List of awards and nominations for JR Bourne
Year	Awards	Category	Nominated work	Result	Ref.
2003	Leo Award	Best Supporting Performance by a Male in a feature Length Drama	On the Corner	Nominated	
2003	Vancouver Film Critics Circle Award	Best Supporting Actor – Canadian Film	On the Corner	Won	
2006	Leo Award	Best Supporting Performance by a Male in a feature Length Drama	Everything's Gone Green	Nominated	
2006	Vancouver Film Critics Circle Award	Best Supporting Actor – Canadian Film	Everything's Gone Green	Won	
