= Pallophotophone =

Photographic sound recording system

Charles Hoxie (R) demonstrating use of his pallophotophone in 1923.

The pallophotophone (coined from the Greek root words pallo, to oscillate or shake; photo, light; and phone, sound, therefore literally meaning "shaking light sound") was a photographic sound recording and playback system developed by General Electric researcher Charles A. Hoxie circa 1922. The RCA Photophone sound-on-film system for motion pictures was later derived from it.

== System ==
The pallophotophone was an optical sound system which could record and play back audio tracks on a strip of 35 mm black-and-white photographic film. Separate recording and playback units were employed. In recording, the sound waves vibrated a tiny mirror which reflected a ray of light through a narrow slit onto the moving film, creating a "sound track" that encoded the audio-frequency variations in air pressure as variations in the width of the track. After the film was developed, each track could be played by running it between a slit illuminated by a steady light and a photoelectric cell, converting the variations in track width into variations of light intensity and a similarly modulated electrical signal, which was electronically amplified and used to drive a loudspeaker or other device.

Surviving examples of pallophotophone recordings have several tracks recorded in parallel on each strip of film, and Hoxie's system has therefore been called the world's first multitrack recording system, as it predates magnetic tape multitrack recording by several decades. However, unlike later multitrack optical, magnetic, and digital sound recording systems, multiple tracks on pallophotophone films are not known to have been used for later mixdown or similar post-production purposes, or for simultaneously recording two or more channels for stereophonic sound reproduction. Multiple narrow tracks, recorded one at a time in separate passes through the device, simply made much more economical use of the medium by multiplying the total recording time possible on a given length of 35 mm film running at a given speed.

== History ==
During a brief period shortly after its creation, the pallophotophone system was occasionally put to practical use in radio broadcasting. On December 13, 1922, then-Vice President Calvin Coolidge used it to record a speech for broadcast on Christmas Eve. In 1923, celebrities including Thomas Edison, Pope Pius XI, General John Pershing and child star Jackie Coogan made pallophotophone recordings for later playback over the air. Although the audio quality was reportedly as good as a live broadcast and the system was otherwise a technological success, these uses were experimental and the system was never adopted by the broadcasting industry.

In 1925, the Brunswick-Balke-Collender Company, maker of Brunswick phonograph records, licensed parts of GE's system for use in the electrical recording process it was developing. Instead of beaming the light onto photographic film, the vibrating mirror reflected it directly into a photoelectric cell, generating an electronic audio signal which was amplified and used to drive the side-to-side motions of the recording stylus as it engraved a spiral groove into the rotating wax master disc. Brunswick publicized its unique method as "Brunswick Light-Ray" recording. Used simply as a novel type of general-purpose microphone, this hollowed-out version of the pallophotophone proved to be very problematic. In 1927, Brunswick abandoned it in favor of the ordinary carbon and condenser microphones being used by its competitors.

In the later 1920s and early 1930s, GE experimented with variations of the system and recorded many radio broadcasts from its Schenectady, New York radio station WGY. Unlike the first-generation recorder, in these variants the tiny mirror was not vibrated directly by sound waves, but by an electromagnetic audio signal originating from a conventional microphone. In 1927, GE publicly unveiled a variable-area sound-on-film motion picture sound system based on this method. It was marketed by RCA (then a GE subsidiary) as RCA Photophone. In 1929, RKO Radio Pictures became the first motion picture studio to use Photophone exclusively. Western Electric later acquired the Photophone trademark.

== 21st century reconstruction ==
As far as is known, none of the original pallophotophone machines built by GE have survived to the present day, but some reels of pallophotophone recordings of radio broadcasts still exist. In 2008, thirteen reels were rediscovered in the archives of the Schenectady Museum by curator Chris Hunter and John Schneiter, a former GE researcher and museum board member. The films were labeled "radio programs of 1929–1930” and had several unusual characteristics that were puzzling. Unlike normal 35 mm film, they did not have sprocket holes. Schneiter contacted his former colleague Russ DeMuth, a mechanical engineer at GE Global Research, to help decipher the mysterious films. Hunter, Schneiter and DeMuth studied the patents and photographs of the original pallophotophone and built a new player from scratch, using modern components, with which they were able to recover the audio from the reels.

The material on the surviving reels included:

- An early seven-note version of the NBC chimes
- A broadcast of a high-school basketball match, believed to be the world's second-oldest recording of a sports broadcast
- A historic October 21, 1929 recording of the 82-year-old Thomas Edison, with Henry Ford and President Herbert Hoover, speaking on a broadcast commemorating "Light's Golden Jubilee", the 50th anniversary of Edison's invention of the incandescent light bulb
