= Tom Dowd & the Language of Music =

2003 film

- Directed by: Mark Moormann
- Starring: Les Paul; Eric Clapton; John Coltrane; Ray Charles; Otis Redding; Ornette Coleman; Tito Puente; Thelonious Monk; Cream; Aretha Franklin; Lynyrd Skynyrd; Derek and the Dominos; Booker T. & the M.G.'s; The Allman Brothers Band
- Production company: Palm Pictures
- Release date: January 19, 2003 (US)
- Running time: 89 minutes
- Country: United States

Tom Dowd & the Language of Music is a documentary about the life and work of music producer/recording engineer Tom Dowd released in 2003 and in theater in August 2004. The documentary contains historical footage, vintage photographs, and interviews with a list of musicians from the worlds of jazz, soul and classic rock, providing insight into the life of Dowd. It was a 2005 Grammy Award nominee. The film is also stored in the Library of Congress.

== About ==
An engineer and producer for Atlantic Records, Dowd was responsible for some of the most influential R&B, rock, and jazz records in the 20th century. In his own words, Dowd tells how he went from working on the Manhattan Project as rising physicist, while still high school age, to recording some of these records. Dowd's technical skills increased the popularity of the recording studio for making music. The documentary tells how his use of the multitrack eight-track tape recorder at Atlantic Records in the late 1950s gave musicians and producers greater control over their productions and helped bring music recording from being monaural to stereo. His contributions made it possible to isolate musical sounds and then manipulate (mix) their parts in the recording process.

John Coltrane, Charlie Mingus, Aretha Franklin, Bobby Darin, The Drifters, Eric Clapton, Cream, the Allman Brothers are some of the artists interviewed in the documentary.

Filmmaker Mark Moormann premiered the documentary at the 2003 Sundance Film Festival and its international premiere was at the 2003 Toronto International Film Festival. Chris Blackwell's Palm Pictures has released the film in North America and the Caribbean and Lightning Entertainment is handling the foreign release of the film. Dowd died in 2002, shortly after this documentary was made.

== Reception ==
Reception to the documentary at its time of release was positive. Variety, The Austin Chronicle, and Film Threat both gave positive reviews, though Variety noted the film "feels a little long." Author Robert Gordon in the book Respect Yourself: Stax Records and the Soul Explosion called the film a "thrill for all fans of pop music since the early 1960s." The film has also been recommended by authors to watch when learning about becoming an audio engineer.

On review aggregator website Rotten Tomatoes, the film holds an approval rating of 90% based on 30 reviews, with an average rating of 7.4/10.

== Soundtrack ==
Derek And The Dominos

- "Layla"

Cream

- "Tales Of Brave Ulysses"
- "Strange Brew"
- "Sunshine Of Your Love"

Jesse Jones Jr.

- "This Is The Thang"
- "Papa Stoppa"
- "That's The Way Love Is"

Eddie Condon

- "Improvisation For The March Of Time"

Eileen Barton

- "If I Knew You Were Comin' I'd've Baked A Cake"

Cab Calloway

- "Hotcha Razz-Ma-Tazz"

Joe Morris

- "The Applejack"

Stick McGhee

- "Drinkin' Wine Spo-Dee-O-Dee"

Tito Puente

- "Oye Còmo Va"

Columbia University Band

- "Roar Lion, Roar"
- "Sans Souci"

Big Joe Turner

- "Flip Flop And Fly"

Ruth Brown

- "Mama He Treats Your Daughter Mean"

Ray Charles

- "It Should've Been Me"
- "This Little Girl Of Mine"

John Coltrane

- "Naima"

Thelonious Monk

- "Blue Monk"

Ornette Coleman

- "First Take"

Les Paul

- "Sweet Georgia Brown"

The Coasters

- "Charlie Brown"
- "Poison Ivy"

Charles Mingus

- "Pithecanthropus Erectus"

The Drifters

- "Save the Last Dance for Me"

Ben E. King

- "Stand By Me"

Bobby Darin

- "Mack The Knife"

Booker T. & the M.G.'s

- "Hip Hug-Her"
- "Green Onions"

Rufus Thomas

- "Walking the Dog"

Otis Redding

- "Try A Little Tenderness"

Aretha Franklin

- "Baby, Baby, Baby"
- "Ain't No Way"
- "Respect"

The Allman Brothers Band

- "Midnight Rider"
- "In Memory Of Elizabeth Reed"
- "Whipping Post"

Lynyrd Skynyrd

- "Workin' For MCA"
- "Gimme Back My Bullets"
- "Freebird"

The Goods

- "Blow Your Mind"
- "Snow Skies"
- "I Love You"
- "Maybe It's Me"

Tom Dowd

- "I Love A Piano (Joe Bushkin piano cover)"

Wilson Pickett

- "Land Of 1000 Dances"
