= Charles A. Hoxie =

American electrical engineer

Charles Hoxie (R) demonstrates use of his pallophotophone.

Charles A. Hoxie (February 26, 1867–October 13, 1941) was an American electrical engineer who created the pallophotophone at General Electric. During his career (1912–1932) at General Electric, he devised a sound-on-film process to put recordings on film and so is credited as one of the inventors of sound film.

== Biography ==
Charles A. Hoxie was born February 26, 1867 in Constable, New York.

Hoxie studied mechanical and electrical engineering and made his first technological success as an inventor developing an internal telephone system that saw use in the shoe factory cities of New England. He was later made wire chief of the New England Telephone Company.

In 1912, Hoxie left New England Telephone to join the General Electric Company of Schenectady, New York, where he worked in the research department. In 1920, Hoxie developed a visual and photographic receiver for trans-Atlantic communications which was capable of transmitting and receiving up to 600 words per minute, far faster than what was capable by a skillful hand operator.

Hoxie's work became focused upon the inscription of sound waves through small vibrating mirrors, resulting in the invention of the pallophotophone, an important forerunner for the sound encryption of motion picture film, which launched commercially in 1927.

Hoxie died October 13, 1941, in Alplaus, New York. He was 74 years old at the time of his death. He was buried in Attleboro, Massachusetts on October 16, 1941.

== See also ==
- History of multitrack recording
- List of film formats
- List of film sound systems
- History of sound recording
