= Josef Szulc =

Polish composer and conductor

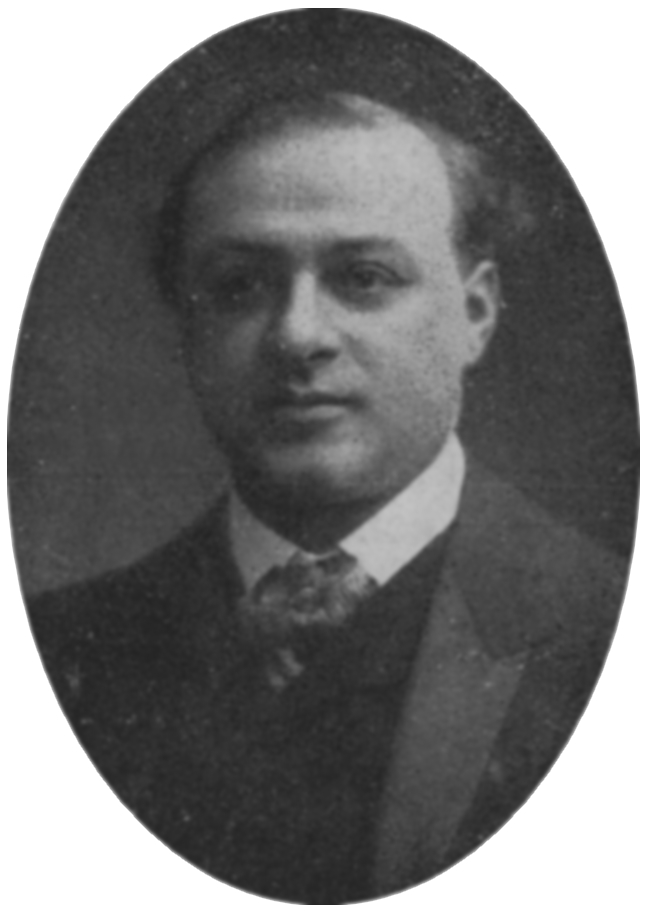
Józef Szulc before 1921

Josef Zygmunt Szulc (4 April 1875, Warsaw, Warsaw Governorate, Russian Empire – 10 April 1956, Paris, France) was a composer and conductor. He also used the pseudonym Jan Sulima.

== Life ==
Szulc was born in Poland to a musical family. His first cousins were the conductor and composer Ignatz Waghalter and the renowned cellist Henryk Waghalter. Szulc began his formal training as a pianist at the Warszawa Conservatory under Moszkowski. He also lived in Berlin briefly (using the name Joseph Schultz) and later moved to Paris to complete his studies in conducting and composition in 1899, converting the spelling of his first name to Joseph. At the conservatoire he trained under Jules Massenet. In 1903 he moved to Brussels, where he was made chief conductor at the Théâtre de la Monnaie and saw instant success with his ballet Ispahan and several tunes.

His wife, Suzy Delsart, was an operetta star (operette divette) and sang the title role of The Merry Widow by Franz Lehár and also influenced her husband into writing lighter and more popular tunes. In 1907 he completed the music for Marcel Gerbidon's operetta, Flossie or Je m'appelle Flossie.

In 1908 he adapted Pierre Veber's comedy Loute, then in 1914 began the musical comedy Flup ! to a libretto by Gaston Dumestre, which had a successful premiere in 1920, followed by 5,000 performances. His other successes included Titin to a libretto by Gaston Dumestre.

Between World War I and World War II, he composed nearly twenty operettas. Additionally, he wrote songs to poetry of Paul Verlaine (Opus 83) one song of which was recorded by the great tenor, Enrico Caruso. It was recorded by other major artists of the day and was featured in an anthology printed in the United States by International Music Company. Sergius Kage was the compiler of this anthology. Szulc wrote some other lieder to German poetry which were published in Berlin during a brief stint there. he also composed a Violin Sonata.

Szulc's song, "Clair de Lune", from his 10 Melodies, Op. 83, has been recorded by French countertenor Philippe Jaroussky on his album Green – Melodies Francaises. This was also the song recorded by Caruso and other artists in the 1910s and 20s.

Collections of Szulc operetta scores have been found in the University of Nebraska, Lincoln music library, donated by Jack Rokhar. Another collection can be found at the British Library. The donor pasted many articles and reviews in the flyleaf of these scores and they are an invaluable source of information for researchers.

== Musical comedies ==
- 1920 : "Flup !", with a libretto by Gaston Dumestre
- 1920 : "Titin", with a libretto by Gaston Dumestre
- 1925 : "Mannequins", with a libretto by Jacques Bousquet and Henri Falk
- 1926 : "Divin Mensonge", with a libretto by Alex Madis, Pierre Veber and Hugues Delorme.
- 1945 : "Pantoufle", with a libretto by Albert Willemetz

== Filmography ==
- 1930 : La route est belle, directed by Robert Florey and André Baugé
- 1930 : L'Enfant de l'amour, directed by Marcel L'Herbier
- 1933 : Mannequins, directed by René Hervil
- 1933 : Les Surprises du sleeping, directed by Karl Anton
- 1935 : Wedding Night, directed by Maurice Kéroul and Georges Monca

== Discography ==
- 2013 : Violin sonata in A minor op. 61 – Acte Préalable AP0271

== Notes ==
1. ^Brister, Wanda. (2011). The Songs of Józef Zygmunt Szulc. Journal of Singing, Vol. 67, no. 3, 347–354.
