= Jules Raucourt =

Belgian film actor

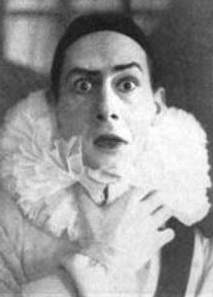
Jules Raucourt as Pierrot in Prunella, 1918

Jules Raucourt, born on May 8, 1890, in Brussels, Belgium and died on January 30, 1967, in Los Angeles, California, was a Belgian film actor. He acted in Belgian, French and American film productions.

== Life and career ==
He is also known under the names Jules Raucort or Raucourt. He played roles for films between 1917 and 1939. He had more important roles were in silent film performances. He notably played in The Poor Gentleman (1921) by Armand Du Plessy based on the screenplay of the novel published in 1855 by Hendrik Conscience, produced by Hippolyte De Kempeneer.

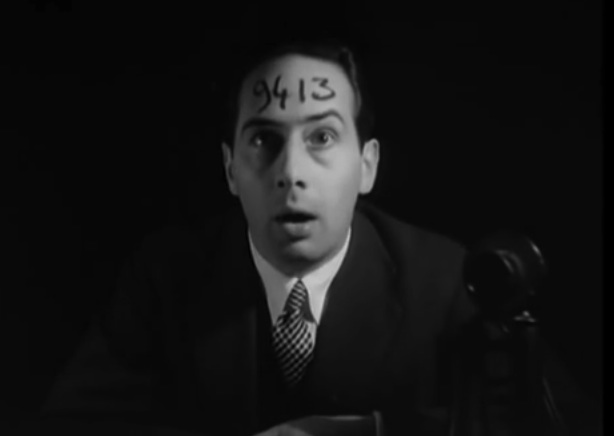
Jules Raucourt, starring as extra #9413 in The Life and Death of 9413: a Hollywood Extra

Later, Raucourt played Mr. Jones #9413, the subject of the landmark experimental film The Life and Death of 9413: a Hollywood Extra (1928). He later wrote a novel, using the title of the film. His appearance in Life and Death of 9413 had some parallels with his life of beginning in lead roles in silents, then being relegated to small parts, often as an uncredited extra in his own career.

== Partial filmography ==
- 1918: My Wife by Dell Henderson, as Ronald Farwell
- 1918: La Tosca by Edward José, as Mario Cavaradossi
- 1918: Prunella, by Maurice Tourneur
- 1928: His Tiger Wife by Hobart Henley
- 1928: The Life and Death of 9413: a Hollywood Extra by Robert Florey and Slavko Vorkapić
- 1930: Le sceptre vert by Jacques Feyder, as Sir James Rimsay
- 1934: Caravane by Erik Charell, as Baron de Tokay
- 1935: Folies-Bergère, by Marcel Achard and Roy Del Ruth, as the finance minister; (French version of Folies Bergère de Paris by Roy Del Ruth, 1935)
- 1935: The Lottery Lover, by Wilhelm Thiele, as Frenchman

== Bibliography ==
- James, David E. (2005). The Most Typical Avant-Garde: History and Geography of Minor Cinemas in Los Angeles. Oakland, California: University of California Press. ISBN 0520242580.
- Slide, Anthony (2012). Hollywood Unknowns: A History of Extras, Bit Players, and Stand-Ins. Jackson: University Press of Mississippi. ISBN 978-1617034749.
- Taves, Brian (1987). Robert Florey: The French Expressionist. Lanham, Maryland: Scarecrow Press. ISBN 0810819295.
