= Tonia Navar =

French actress and playwright

Tonia Navar (1886–1959), also known as Melle Tonia Navar and Antoinette Lauzur, was a French actress and playwright.

== Major roles ==
She performed in 1927 at the Comédie Francaise in Saint-Georges Bouhélier's new play Les Flambeaux de la Noel. In the summer of 1930, she played her first major role at the Comédie Francaise, Yanetta in Eugène Brieux's play La robe rouge (1900). In the late 1930s, she often played the title role in Jean Racine's Phèdre. She also had the title role in Racine's Britannicus and in Baisers perdus in 1932.

Navar also performed in films, among them The Road Is Fine (1930), directed by Robert Florey, and The Foreigner (1931), directed by Gaston Ravel.

== Playwright ==
Navar wrote Un homme est venu and L'amour en coulisses. She is mentioned as an important French woman playwright in a study published in 2001.

== Teaching ==
In 1939, a journal reported that Navar's acting course, called "Cours Molière" was growing and had to move to larger facilities. Navar's Parisian acting school prepared students for stage and film careers. Jacqueline Maillan was one of her students.

== Personal life ==
She was befriended with the courtesan, performer and later princess, Liane de Pougy, with whom she exchanged letters in the 1930s. Pougy mentions her several times in her memoirs.

Parisian society columns reported on Navar as a celebrity in 1924. In 1930, newspapers reported on a lawsuit that Navar had filed against a British film company which allegedly caused her to gain weight, become less attractive, and damage her voice in the course of a film production.

Little is known of her political convictions or activities during the Second World Ward, yet a prominent advertisement in a film magazine devoted mainly to German stars suggests that she was not considered politically dangerous to the Vichy regime.
