= This Is the Night (1932 film) =

1932 film

- Lobby card with Lilli Damita and Cary Grant
- Directed by: Frank Tuttle
- Written by: Benjamin Glazer; George Marion Jr. play Naughty Cinderella; Avery Hopwood play Pouche; Henri Falk; René Peter
- Produced by: Benjamin Glazer (uncredited)
- Starring: Lili Damita; Charles Ruggles; Roland Young; Thelma Todd; Cary Grant
- Cinematography: Victor Milner
- Music by: Ralph Rainger; W. Franke Harling (uncredited); John Leipold (uncredited)
- Production company: Paramount Pictures
- Distributed by: Paramount Pictures
- Release date: April 8, 1932
- Running time: 80 minutes
- Country: United States
- Language: English

This Is the Night is a 1932 American pre-Code comedy film directed by Frank Tuttle, and starring Lili Damita, Charles Ruggles, Roland Young, Thelma Todd, and Cary Grant in his film debut. It was made by Paramount Pictures.

The picture is based on the 1923 play Pouche by Henri Falk and René Peter, and the 1925 English-language adaptation Naughty Cinderella written by Avery Hopwood. The plays had already been adapted for film once before as Good and Naughty (1926) with Pola Negri.

Night scenes in this film were intended to be seen in blue tint. Tinting is used on the restored 2011 single DVD version released by Turner Classic Movies. However, tinting was absent from recent prints prior to restoration. The version shown on the TCM cable channel in the 1990s was not tinted, nor is the version in the 2016 DVD set "Cary Grant - The Vault Collection".

== Plot ==
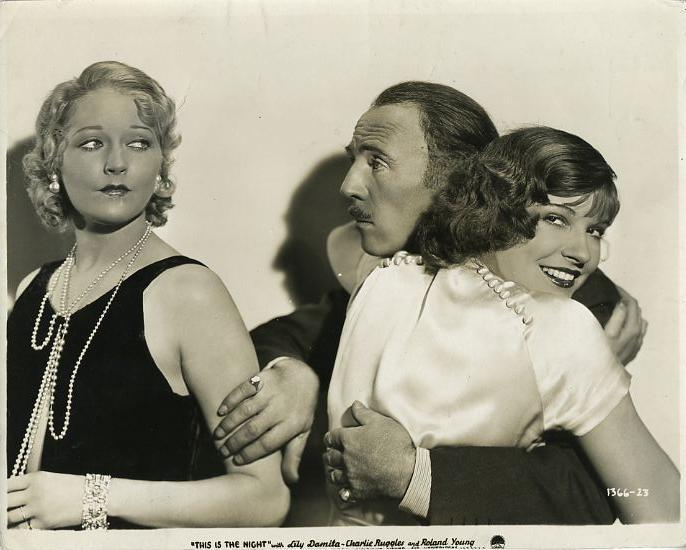
Thelma Todd, Roland Young and Lili Damita in This Is the Night

When Claire Mathewson's husband Stephen comes back unexpectedly from the 1932 Summer Olympics, where he was supposed to compete in the javelin throw, he discovers the train tickets for a romantic Venice getaway she has planned with her lover Gerald.

Gerald's friend, Bunny, lies and says that the tickets are actually for Gerald and his wife. With Stephen still suspicious, Gerald must find a fake wife to go to Venice with him. He tries to hire the actress Chou-Chou, but since her boyfriend is a jealous man, she gives the job to out-of-work Germaine, who needs the 2000 franc fee to keep from starving. At first, Gerald thinks she is too demure, but she soon convinces him that she can pretend to be a glamorous wife.

The two couples go to Venice. Bunny, attracted to Germaine, decides to join them. On the train, Stephen questions Gerald and Germaine about how they met. When they arrive in Venice, Claire quickly becomes jealous, as both Stephen and Gerald seem fascinated by Germaine. Claire eventually demands that Gerald send Germaine away immediately, so he orders her to leave the next day. Meanwhile, a drunken Bunny climbs a ladder into Germaine's bedroom and offers to take her away. After she turns down his offer, he falls into a canal on his way out and is apprehended by two policemen. Stephen believes he hears a burglar and goes to her room to investigate. The two are then caught in a seemingly compromising position by Gerald and Claire. However, Bunny reappears and explains what really happened. Her love for her husband rekindled, Claire breaks off her affair with Gerald. Germaine reveals to Gerald that she is not in fact Chou-Chou and decides to return to Paris, but Gerald catches up to her in a gondola and asks her to marry him.

== Cast ==
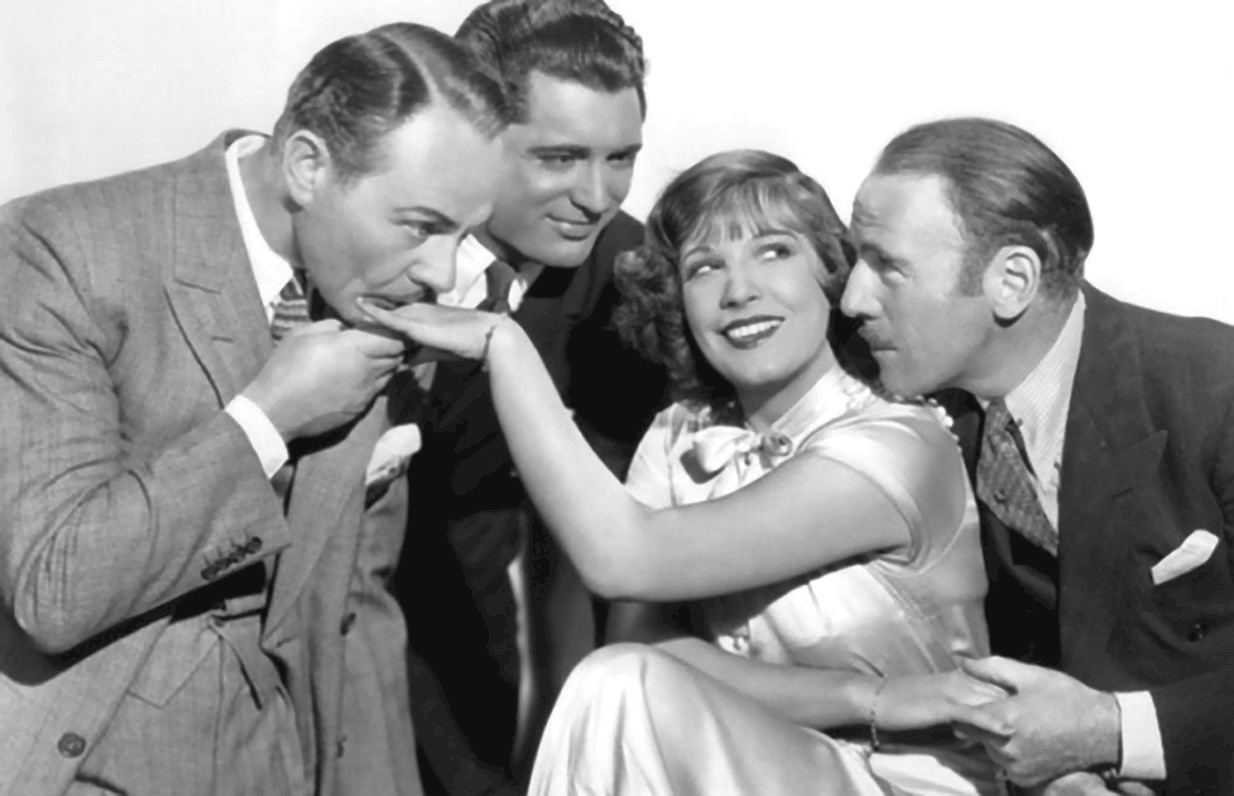
Charles Ruggles, Cary Grant, Lili Damita and Roland Young in This Is the Night

- Lili Damita as Germaine
- Charles Ruggles as Bunny West
- Roland Young as Gerald Grey
- Thelma Todd as Claire
- Cary Grant as Stephen Mathewson
- Irving Bacon as Sparks, Gerald's chauffeur. In a running gag, he repeatedly snags Claire's dress, causing her to lose her clothing.
- Davison Clark as Studio Official (uncredited)
- Gino Corrado as Manager of Neapolitan Hotel (uncredited)
- Claire Dodd as Chou-Chou (uncredited)
- Alex Melesh as Porter (uncredited)
- Donald Novis as Singing Gondolier (uncredited)
- Tiny Sandford as Porter (uncredited)
- Rolfe Sedan as Boulevardier (uncredited)
- Harry Semels as Man in the Manhole (uncredited)

== Production ==
This Is the Night is Cary Grant's feature film debut. He disliked his role, believing that a man accepting the unfaithfulness of his wife so calmly was unbelievable. After seeing the film, he decided to quit the movie industry; his friend Orry-Kelly talked him out of it.

== Reception ==
The film received a mixed to positive reception from critics. The reviewer from the Times stated that the "plot is hardly worth repeating, for it is occupied only with the ritual humours of infidelity and intoxication", but he praised Roland Young, Charlie Ruggles and Claire Dodd's performances, describing them as "very skilful". Bob Wagner of Script thought that the film was made to a high standard, with "exceptionally beautiful" cinematography. He spotted Cary Grant as a newcomer in the film and thought that he made a "splendid figure".

== Sources ==
- Deschner, Donald (1973). The Complete Films of Cary Grant. Citadel Press. ISBN 0-8065-0376-9.
- Eliot, Marc (2005). Cary Grant: A Biography. Random House. ISBN 0-307-20983-0.
