= Face value (disambiguation) =

The face value of a coin, stamp, or bank note is the value printed on the object.

Face Value may also refer to:

- Face Value (1918 film), an American silent drama film
- Face Value (1927 film), an American silent drama film
- Face Value (album), a 1981 album by Phil Collins
- Face Value (book), a 1983 compilation book by Jani Allan
- Face Value (play), a 1993 play by David Henry Hwang
- "Face Value", a 2004 episode from TV series Powers
- "Face Value", a 2012 song by The Ghost Inside from Get What You Give
- "Face value", a 1996 song by Prong from Rude Awakening
- "Face Value", a 2013 song by The Story So Far from What You Don't See
- "Face Values", a 1996 song by The Suicide Machines from Destruction by Definition
- Par value in finance and accounting
