= Paul Porcasi =

Italian actor (1879–1946)

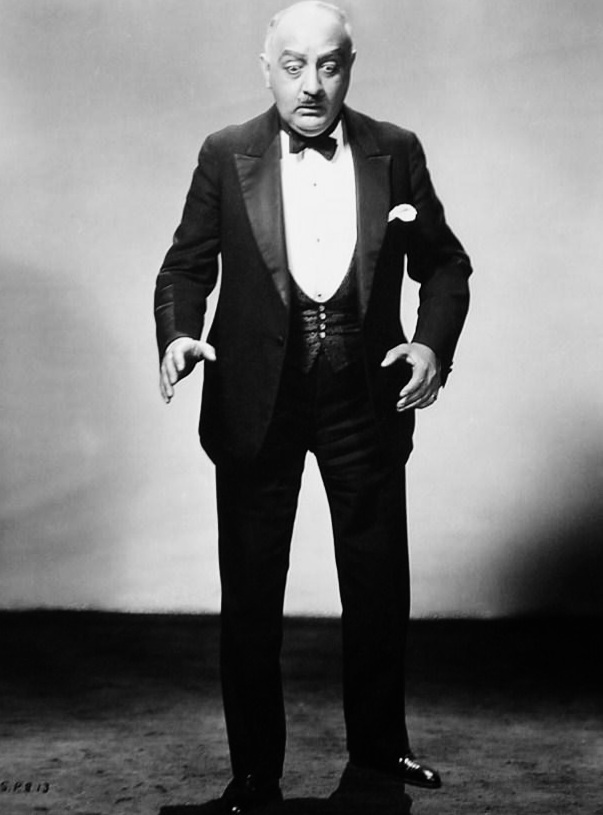
- Porcasi reprised his stage role in the film Broadway (1929)
- Born: 1 January 1879; Palermo, Sicily, Italy
- Died: 8 August 1946 (aged 67); Van Nuys, California, U.S.
- Occupation: Actor
- Years active: 1916–1945
- Spouse: Rose Marie Porcasi
- Children: 1

Paul Porcasi (1 January 1879 – 8 August 1946) was an Italian actor. He appeared in more than 140 films from 1917 to 1945.

== Biography ==
Porcasi sang with the Metropolitan Opera.

One of his early non-operatic productions was The Country Boy. He ended his theatrical career with the role of Nick Verdis in Broadway, which ran for 603 performances (16 September 1926 – 11 February 1928) at the Broadhurst Theatre. He reprised the role of Nick the Greek in Universal's 1929 film adaptation of the play.

Porcasi's other Broadway credits included Oh Mama (1925), The Texas Nightingale (1922), The National Anthem (1922), Jimmie (1920), Little Simplicity (1918), Blind Youth (1917), and Follow Me (1916).

Porcasi's film debut was in Fall of the Romanoffs (1917). He also was seen in MGM's adventure film Tarzan and His Mate (1934).

Porcasi and his wife Rose Marie had a son. Porcasi died on 8 August 1946 at his home in Van Nuys, California, aged 67.

== Selected filmography ==
- The Fall of the Romanoffs (1917; uncredited)
- Way Down East (1920) as Party Guest (uncredited)) as
- Cobra (1925) as Cafe Proprietor (uncredited)
- Say It Again (1926) as Count Tanza
- Broadway (1929) as Nick Verdis
- Murder on the Roof (1930) as Joe Carozzo
- Such Men Are Dangerous (1930) as Monsieur Durand (uncredited)
- The Three Sisters (1930) as Rinaldi
- Born Reckless (1930) as Pa Beretti
- A Lady's Morals (1930) as Maretti
- Morocco (1930) as Lo Tinto
- Derelict (1930) as Masoni
- The Criminal Code (1930) as Tony Spelvin
- The Men of North [ ( Luigi La Volpe ) ] (1931) as John Ruskin
- Gentleman's Fate (1931) as Papa Mario Giovanni
- Doctors' Wives (1931) as Dr. Calucci
- The Good Bad Girl (1931) as Tony Pagano
- Svengali (1931) as Bonelli
- Party Husband (1931) as Henri Renard
- Smart Money (1931) as Alexander Amenoppopolus
- Children of Dreams (1931; uncredited)
- El pasado acusa (1931) as Tony Pagano
- Bought! (1931) as Rapello
- Jenny Lind (1931) as Maretti
- Under Eighteen (1931) as François
- The Woman from Monte Carlo (1932) as Minor Role (scenes deleted)
- The Passionate Plumber (1932) as Paul Le Maire
- A Woman Commands (1932) as Cafe Proprietor (uncredited)
- The Man Who Played God (1932) as French Concert Manager (uncredited)
- Stowaway (1932) as Tony
- While Paris Sleeps (1932) as Kapas
- New Morals for Old (1932) as Concierge (uncredited)
- Devil and the Deep (1932) as Hassan
- The Painted Woman (1932) as Nick Machado
- A Parisian Romance (1932) as Deville
- The Red-Haired Alibi (1932) as Margoli
- The Kid from Spain (1932) as Gonzales
- Men Are Such Fools (1932) as Klepak
- Under-Cover Man (1932) as Sam Dorse
- The Death Kiss (1932) as Ellsmith (uncredited)
- A Farewell to Arms (1932) as Harry - Innkeeper (uncredited)
- Cynara (1932) as Joseph, Maitre D'
- The Secret of Madame Blanche (1933) as French Doctor (uncredited)
- Grand Slam (1933) as Nick (uncredited)
- King Kong (1933) as NY Apple Vendor early in the film (uncredited)
- Terror Aboard (1933) as Luigi - the Chef
- Hell Below (1933) as Italian Admiral (uncredited)
- Reunion in Vienna (1933) as Chef (uncredited)
- When Strangers Marry (1933) as Phillipe
- The Devil's in Love (1933) as Bartender (uncredited)
- No Marriage Ties (1933) as Angelo, Saloon Proprietor (uncredited)
- He Couldn't Take It (1933) as Nick
- Devil's Mate (1933) as Nick
- I Loved a Woman (1933) as Apopoulis - Hotel Proprietor in Greece (uncredited)
- Footlight Parade (1933) as Apollinaris
- Saturday's Millions (1933) as Felix
- Gigolettes of Paris (1933)
- Big Time or Bust (1933) as Louie
- Havana Widows (1933) as Fernando - Headwaiter (uncredited)
- Roman Scandals (1933) as Chef (uncredited)
- By Candlelight (1933) as Train Conductor (uncredited)
- Flying Down to Rio (1933) as The Mayor
- The Cat and the Fiddle (1934) as Cafe Proprietor (uncredited)
- Coming Out Party (1934) as Manager
- Looking for Trouble (1934) as Cabaret Manager
- Riptide (1934) as House Detective (uncredited)
- Tarzan and His Mate (1934) as Monsieur Feronde (uncredited)
- The Great Flirtation (1934) as Herr Direktor
- His Greatest Gamble (1934) as Innkeeper (uncredited)
- La Cucaracha (1934, short) as Señor Martinez
- Chained (1934) as Mr. Piazza, Hotel Manager (uncredited)
- British Agent (1934) as Count Romano
- Wake Up and Dream (1934) as Polopolis
- The Gay Divorcee (1934) as French Headwaiter (uncredited)
- Imitation of Life (1934) as Jackson's Restaurant Manager (uncredited)
- Million Dollar Baby (1934) as Marvelo No. 1
- Enter Madame (1935) as Archimede
- Rumba (1935) as Carlos
- A Night at the Ritz (1935) as Henri
- The Florentine Dagger (1935) as Antonio
- Baby Face Harrington (1935) as Headwaiter (uncredited)
- Go Into Your Dance (1935) as Show MC (uncredited)
- Under the Pampas Moon (1935) as Headwaiter
- Charlie Chan in Egypt (1935) as Insp. Fouad Soueida
- Broadway Gondolier (1935) as Señor Fuzzi (uncredited)
- Waterfront Lady (1935) as Tony Spadaloni
- Hi, Gaucho! (1935) as General Ortegas
- The Payoff (1935) as Nick
- Stars Over Broadway (1935) as Luigi (uncredited)
- Coronado (1935) as Waiter (uncredited)
- I Dream Too Much (1935) as Uncle Tito
- La Fiesta de Santa Barbara (1935, Short) as himself
- Rose Marie (1936) as Emil - the Chef (uncredited)
- Muss 'em Up (1936) as Luigi Turseniani - Head of the Mob
- The Lady Consents (1936) as Joe - Restaurant Proprietor (uncredited)
- The Leathernecks Have Landed (1936) as Enrico 'Rico' Venetzi
- Mr. Deeds Goes to Town (1936) as Italian Opera Board Member (uncredited)
- Trouble for Two (1936) as Cafe Proprietor (uncredited)
- Down to the Sea (1936) as Vasilios
- Crash Donovan (1936) as Cafe Owner
- Two in a Crowd (1936) as Polito, the Headwaiter (uncredited)
- Seventh Heaven (1937) as Gendarme
- Maytime (1937) as Trentini
- Café Metropole (1937) as Police Official
- That I May Live (1937) as Mr. Scaffa (uncredited)
- The Emperor's Candlesticks (1937) as Santuzzi
- Madame X (1937) as Hotel Gran Via Proprietor (uncredited)
- The Bride Wore Red (1937) as Nobili
- Big Town Girl (1937) as Nightclub Manager (uncredited)
- Crime School (1938) as Nick Papadopoulos
- I'll Give a Million (1938) as Cafe Proprietor (uncredited)
- Bulldog Drummond in Africa (1938) as Hotel Manager (uncredited)
- Vacation from Love (1938) as French Judge
- Topper Takes a Trip (1938) as Casino Owner (uncredited)
- Juarez (1939) as Councilman in Meeting with Maximilian (uncredited)
- Lady of the Tropics (1939) as Lamartine
- Everything Happens at Night (1939) as Bartender
- Dr. Kildare's Strange Case (1940) as Antonio "Tony", the Hospital Chef
- I Was an Adventuress (1940) as Fisherman
- Torrid Zone (1940) as Garcia
- Brother Orchid (1940) as Warehouse Manager (uncredited)
- Argentine Nights (1940) as Papa Viejos
- The Border Legion (1940) as Tony
- Moon Over Burma (1940) as Storekeeper
- The Trial of Mary Dugan (1941) as Ship's Captain (uncredited)
- Road to Zanzibar (1941) as Turk at Slave Market (uncredited)
- Two in a Taxi (1941) as Herman
- Rags to Riches (1941) as Professor Del Rio
- Doctors Don't Tell (1941) as Montez
- It Started with Eve (1941) as Armand - the Chef (uncredited)
- Road to Happiness (1941) as Pietro Pacelli
- Casablanca (1942) as Native introducing Ferrari (uncredited)
- Star Spangled Rhythm (1942) as Benito Mussolini—"Sweater, Sarong & Peekaboo Bang" Number (uncredited)
- Quiet Please, Murder (1942) as Rebescu (uncredited)
- Background to Danger (1943) as Customs Official with Joe (uncredited)
- Hi Diddle Diddle (1943) as Impresario
- Melody Parade (1943)
- The Unknown Guest (1943) as Town Barber (uncredited)
- Hot Rhythm (1944) as Mr. Peroni
- Hail the Conquering Hero (1944) as Cafe Owner (uncredited)
- Swing Hostess (1944) as Spumoni
- An American Romance (1944) as Professor Giovanni Cantaloni (uncredited)
- Nothing but Trouble (1944) as Italian Restaurateur (uncredited)
- I'll Remember April (1945) as Popolopolis
