= The Flower of the Indies =

1921 film

- Directed by: Théo Bergerat
- Written by: Théo Bergerat
- Starring: Huguette Duflos; André Baugé
- Production company: Société Générale des Cinématographes Éclipse
- Distributed by: Ciné-Location-Eclipse
- Release date: 18 March 1921
- Country: France
- Languages: Silent; French intertitles

The Flower of the Indies (French:La fleur des Indes) is a 1921 French silent film directed by Théo Bergerat and starring Huguette Duflos, André Baugé and Geo Leclercq.

== Cast ==
- Huguette Duflos as Huguette
- André Baugé as Jean de Mavel
- Geo Leclercq as Docteur Fontanes
- Haroutounian as Roucem

== Bibliography ==
- Philippe Rège. Encyclopedia of French Film Directors, Volume 1. Scarecrow Press, 2009.
