= Two in a Taxi =

1941 film by Robert Florey

- Directed by: Robert Florey
- Produced by: Irving Briskin
- Starring: Anita Louise; Russell Hayden; Noah Beery Jr. Dick Purcell
- Cinematography: George Meehan
- Edited by: Viola Lawrence
- Music by: Morris Stoloff
- Production company: Columbia Pictures
- Distributed by: Columbia Pictures
- Release date: 10 July 1941
- Running time: 63 minutes
- Country: United States
- Language: English

Two in a Taxi is a 1941 American comedy film directed by Robert Florey and starring Anita Louise, Russell Hayden, Noah Beery Jr. and Dick Purcell. It was produced and distributed by Columbia Pictures. Writer Marvin Wald was inspired by seeing a production of Clifford Odets' Waiting for Lefty to write this drama of cab drivers and their economic struggles.

== Cast ==
- Anita Louise as Bonnie
- Russell Hayden as Jimmy Owens
- Noah Beery Jr. as Sandy Connors
- Dick Purcell as Bill Gratton
- Chick Chandler as Sid
- Fay Helm as Ethel
- Frank Yaconelli as Tony Vitale
- George Cleveland as Gas Station Proprietor
- Ben Taggart as Sweeny
- Paul Porcasi as Herman
- Henry Brandon as the professor
- John Harmon as Benny
- James Seay as Cristy Reardon

== Bibliography ==
- Fetrow, Alan G. Feature Films, 1940-1949: a United States Filmography. McFarland, 1994.
