= The Life and Death of 9413: a Hollywood Extra =

1928 film

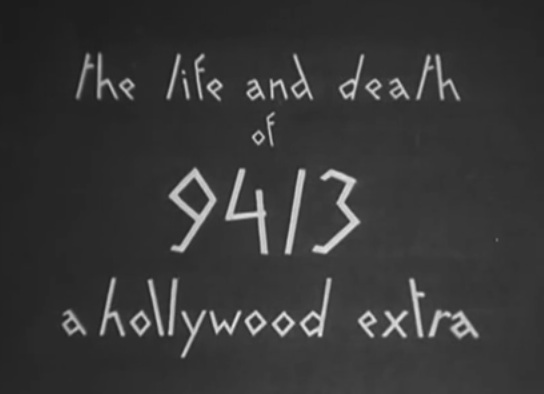
- Title card from the film
- Directed by: Robert Florey; Slavko Vorkapić
- Written by: Robert Florey; Slavko Vorkapić
- Produced by: Robert Florey; Douglas Fairbanks
- Starring: Jules Raucourt; Voya George; Adriane Marsh
- Cinematography: Gregg Toland; Paul Ivano
- Music by: George Gershwin
- Distributed by: FBO Pictures Corporation
- Release date: 1928
- Running time: 11 minutes
- Country: United States
- Language: Silent (English intertitles)
- Budget: US$97

The Life and Death of 9413: a Hollywood Extra is a 1928 American silent experimental short film co-written and co-directed by Robert Florey and Slavko Vorkapić. Considered a landmark of American avant-garde cinema, it tells the story of a man (played by Jules Raucourt) who comes to Hollywood with dreams of becoming a star; he fails and becomes dehumanized, with studio executives reducing him to the role of an extra and writing the number "9413" on his forehead.

The film has abrupt cuts, rapid camera movement, extensive superimposition, dim lighting, and twisted shapes and forms at disorienting angles. Filmed on a budget of only $97 ($1,819 in today's (2024+/-) dollars), it includes a combination of close-ups of live actors and long shots of miniature sets constructed from cardboard, paper cubes, tin cans, cigar boxes, and toy trains. With no access to Hollywood studios or equipment, most of the film was made in the filmmakers' homes (their walls painted black to provide a background).

The story was inspired by Florey's own experiences in Hollywood and George Gershwin's Rhapsody in Blue. It was one of the first films shot by Gregg Toland, who was later acclaimed for his work on such films as The Grapes of Wrath (1939) and Citizen Kane (1941). The film is a satire of Hollywood's social conditions, practices and ideologies, and the film industry's alleged mistreatment of actors. Douglas Fairbanks assisted with its development, and Charlie Chaplin and Joseph M. Schenck helped to promote it.

Unlike most experimental films, it received a wide release by FBO Pictures Corporation in more than 700 theaters in North America and Europe. The film has been well received by contemporary and present-day critics; according to film historian Brian Taves, "More than any other American film, it initiated the avant-garde in this country". In 1997, it was selected for preservation by the National Film Registry. Florey co-wrote and directed Hollywood Boulevard (1936), a lighter version of the film.

== Plot ==
Mr. Jones (Jules Raucourt), an artist and aspiring movie star, arrives in Hollywood and is immediately star-struck by the film industry's glitz and glamour. He speaks with a film-studio representative, presenting a letter of recommendation and trying to speak on his own behalf. The representative cuts him off, however, and writes the number "9413" on his forehead. From this point on, 9413 speaks only in unintelligible gibberish and moves mechanically, mindlessly following the instructions of film directors and studio representatives. He goes on a series of casting calls, but is unable to find success; he is repeatedly confronted with signs reading "No Casting Today". A series of images are interspersed through these scenes: shots of Hollywood, cameras filming, the word "Dreams" written in the stars, and a repeating loop of a man walking up a stairway toward the word "Success" without ever reaching the top.

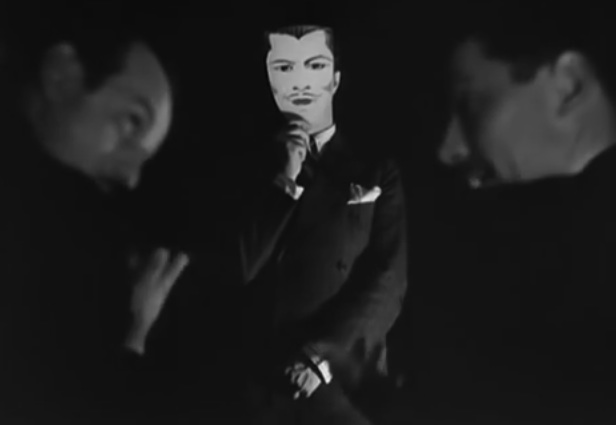
Studio executives applaud Extra #15 (Voya George) as he holds paper masks in front of his face, symbolizing his performances.

Unlike 9413, other extras around him become successful. A woman (Adriane Marsh) with the number 13 on her forehead repeatedly sits down and stands back up at the behest of a film director, and eventually succeeds in landing a part after she is greeted by a "Casting Today" sign. Another extra (Voya George) with the number 15, who (unlike 9413) has an expressionless, unenthusiastic facial expression, holds paper masks symbolizing his performances in front of his face. He is greeted enthusiastically by cheering crowds, all of whom speak in the same gibberish as 9413. His number is replaced with a star, and he becomes tremendously successful. 9413 admires the new movie star and can't contain his excitement when the two meet in person. He presents his own (much more impressive-looking) mask to the star to show he is also an actor. The star is unimpressed and turns his back on 9413, who sadly cradles his mask like a baby and laments his inability to achieve success.

Time passes, and 9413 remains unable to find work in Hollywood. Despite repeated phone calls to studio representatives begging for work, he is always confronted by "No Casting Today" signs. He cannot afford food, and bills he is unable to pay are slipped under his door. A series of images symbolizing his mental anguish include twisted trees blowing in the wind and a man lying on the stairway leading to "Success", still unable to reach the top. Starving, exhausted, and in despair about his failures, he collapses and dies. After the other actors laugh at him, his tombstone is shown. It reads: "Here Lies No. 9413, a Hollywood Extra"; the words "No Casting Today" appear next to it.

After his death, 9413's spirit leaves his body and is pulled up a ramp into the sky. As he gets higher, he grows angelic wings and ascends into heaven: a place with glittering crystal towers and bright, blinking lights. A hand removes the "9413" from his forehead, he smiles happily, and he flies further into heaven.

== Production ==
=== Conception ===
Robert Florey and Slavko Vorkapić, who met after Florey attended one of Vorkapić's American Society of Cinematographers lectures, are credited as co-writers and co-directors of The Life and Death of 9413: a Hollywood Extra. Although accounts differ about the two men's level of involvement in the film's creation, most identify Florey as primarily responsible. According to film historian Brian Taves, Vorkapić was not involved in the writing or direction of the film; his contributions were limited to set design and miniature lighting, but Florey insisted on equal credit for Vorkapić's role in bringing the film to fruition. Early reports about the film support this view, including a 1928 article about Florey in Hollywood Magazine. Taves also says that Vorkapić did nothing to promote the film when it was first released, later exaggerating his role in its production when it became respected. Paul Ivano, who did camerawork on the film, agreed: "Vorkapić tries to get credit, but he didn't do much." Vorkapić has said that the initial idea was Florey's, and they discussed it and drafted a rough one-page synopsis together. However, "all the effects were devised, designed, photographed, and added by me", and "at least 90 percent of the editing and montage" was Vorkapić's work. He said that he directed most of the opening and ending sequences, crediting Florey with filming the casting scene and the shots of laughing extras, and the rise of Voya George's character to stardom was filmed jointly.

Within a few years of his arrival in Hollywood, Florey conceived a film about an ordinary actor's dreams of becoming a star and his failure to realize his hopes. Florey's work as a publicist and journalist covering the film industry gave him a familiarity with the struggles of aspiring actors, and their disappointment at failing to achieve their dreams, which influenced the writing of A Hollywood Extra. The final inspiration for the film, however, came after Florey attended a performance of George Gershwin's Rhapsody in Blue. Florey had been working in Hollywood for only a few months when he heard Gershwin's music, and it inspired him to incorporate its rhythms into a film. He later described the film as a "continuity in musical rhythm of the adventures of my extra in Hollywood, the movements and attitudes of which appeared to synchronize themselves with Gershwin's notes". Although most avant-garde films of the time emphasized mood over emotion, he wanted his script to be equal parts abstraction and narrative. Florey wrote it in precise detail, describing each shot relative to the length of film required (a budget necessity, due to the expense of film stock).

=== Development ===
Florey did not own a camera at the time, and his efforts to obtain one were unsuccessful until he met Vorkapić. Florey recalled, "I say to Slav, 'Slav, I have an idea but not much money. You have a camera and are a clever painter. Let's make the picture in collaboration and we split the benefit.'" According to Vorkapić, he said: "Florey, you get me $100 and I'll make you a picture in my own kitchen." Vorkapić allowed Florey to borrow a small box camera which he had bought with the proceeds from the sale of one of his oil paintings. It was a DeVry camera with one lens, a type which Florey said was sold as a "toy". Florey had trouble obtaining film, since he found it too expensive to purchase negative and positive film from film laboratories. Florey knew that film ends (scraps of leftover, unexposed film stock) were often discarded after shooting on big-budget Hollywood films, however, and he tried to persuade filmmakers to give them to him. Camerawork had just been completed on The Gaucho (1927), a film starring Douglas Fairbanks, and Florey obtained more than 1,000 feet of film from the production in 10- and 20-foot strips. He then spliced the film ends together by hand (a process he found time-consuming and frustrating), which resulted in the equivalent of a full reel of negative film. Fairbanks (who had employed Florey to handle his European public relations) provided financial assistance, gave Florey access to his editing rooms, and helped provide him with film ends.

The film was shot by Gregg Toland (credited simply as "Gregg"), who was also working as an assistant to cinematographer George Barnes at the Samuel Goldwyn Studio. It was one of Toland's first films, and the cinematographer was later acclaimed for his work on The Grapes of Wrath (1939) and Citizen Kane (1941). The Life and Death of 9413: a Hollywood Extra cost $97 ($1,819 today) to make, paid entirely by Florey. The budget consisted of $55 ($1,031 today) for development and printing, $25 ($469 today) for negatives, $14 ($263 today) for transportation, and $3 ($56 today) for store props (most of which cost five or ten cents apiece). Of the development costs, the salaries for everyone involved in the film totaled $3. Toland had the use of a Mitchell camera, which permitted some shots which would have been impossible with the DeVry camera (including about 300 feet of closeups). Additional camerawork was by Paul Ivano; according to Taves, Ivano was primarily responsible for much of the film's camerawork and Toland primarily handled the closeups. A Hollywood Extra was shot on 35mm film, over a three-week period in late 1927, mainly on weekends. No subtitles are used in the film. Only two captions are used, each with one word ("Dreams" and "Success"); they were produced by reflecting a moving light through cardboard cutouts, creating words among the shadows.

=== Casting ===
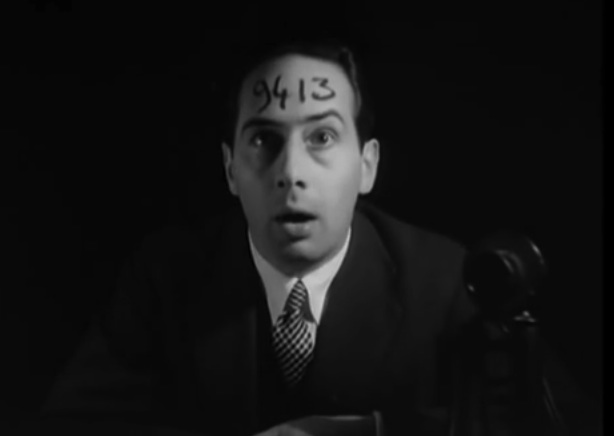
Jules Raucourt played the protagonist, who is dehumanized after studio representatives make him a film extra and write the number 9413 on his forehead.

The extra 9413 was played by Belgian actor Jules Raucourt, who was credited in the film simply as "Raucourt". Although Raucourt began his career as a leading man in silent action films, he became a film extra himself after cinema transitioned to the sound era. Raucourt later wrote a novel, using the title of the film. Extra 13 was played by Adriane Marsh, a film extra in real life who never again had a credited film role. Extra 15 (who becomes a movie star) was played by Voya George, a friend of Vorkapić who went on to a career in European films. Florey appears in the film as a casting director, although only his disembodied mouth and hand are visible as he shakes his finger at the protagonist. Vorkapić also had a brief role in the film, as the man endlessly climbing the staircase to "Success".

=== Filming ===
Since the filmmakers had no access to a studio, the film was shot at their homes; walls were painted black to provide a background. According to Movie Makers writer Herman G. Weinberg and Jack Spears of Films in Review, it was filmed primarily at Florey's house; however, film historian David E. James said that it was filmed in Vorkapić's kitchen. In an interview, Florey said that filming was done in his kitchen and in Vorkapić's living room. Some scenes were filmed in Toland's garage. The film has three basic types of composition: miniature sets, close-ups of live actors, and newsreel-like scenes of Hollywood and film studios. It includes abrupt cuts, rapid camera movement, extensive superimposition, dim lighting, and twisted shapes and forms at disorienting angles. The film has elements of German Expressionism, echoing The Cabinet of Dr. Caligari (1920); its opening credits, in particular, are angular and expressionistic. A single 400-watt lamp was used as lighting for the film; two lamps were originally planned, but one burned out before filming began. During closeups, the actors would hold the light bulb in their hands to light their faces. When an actor changed position, they would switch the bulb from one hand to another. The actors' faces are often in partial shadow as a result, their features obscured. Toland also used small reflectors that he borrowed from film studios, which included a light bulb hung inside a cone-shaped mirror. The film's acting is abstract and stylized, with the actors mouthing gibberish instead of speaking words. A recording of Rhapsody in Blue was played constantly during filming, so that the actors would (in Florey's words) become "saturated" with the rhythm of the "blues". This was a source of annoyance for his neighbors and landlord.

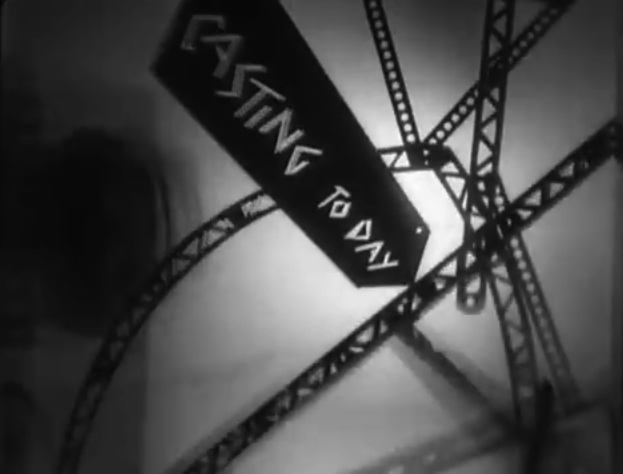

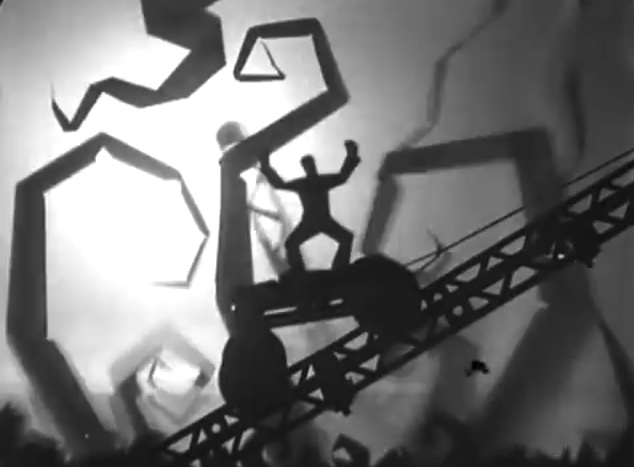
Scenes of Hollywood cityscapes (top) and of heaven at the end of the film (bottom) were achieved with miniature sets made from paper cubes, tin cans, cigar boxes, toy trains and an Erector Set.

Scenes of Hollywood cityscapes and shots of heaven at the end of the film were achieved with miniature sets that were filmed in long shots to appear large and expansive. A total of 45 sets were built, none larger than about two square feet and the most expensive costing $1.67. It took days to prepare the sets; Florey removed cardboard from laundered shirts and cut them into squares, which Vorkapić painted impressionistically to resemble buildings. The elevated trains in the cityscapes were toy trains that Florey purchased and mounted on pasteboard runways; he pulled them along the track on a string with one hand, and shot the scene with the other. Movement on the miniature sets was simulated by moving lamps and casting shadows. To make the sets look more realistic (and to conceal defects), prisms and kaleidoscopes were placed in front of the camera lens and moved during filming; a cylindrical lens was rotated during filming to magnify an image to the desired diameter. According to Florey, this was useful in "giving the scenes the rhythms which we thought they required".

Skyscrapers were oblong cubes filmed from an angle that exaggerated their height. To create the effect of sunlight reflecting from buildings, one person would stand on one side of the cubes with a mirror, and another would stand on the opposite side with a light bulb and swing it back and forth. The mirror would catch the reflection of the swinging light and throw it back onto the skyscrapers. To create the excitement surrounding an opening night, a skyscraper was photographed with the camera swinging quickly up and down and side to side. Although the scenes of the miniature sets were long shots, the actors were filmed entirely in closeups (about 300 feet of the final film reel). Instead of trying to place an actor into the miniature backgrounds with trick photography, the scenes were cut rapidly and successively: the viewer first sees the actor and then the set, creating the impression they are in the same place. Sets involving actors were minimalistic; some consisted of only a few elements, such as a table, telephone, two chairs, and a cigar.

A film-studio set was created by photographing several reel spools with strips of film dangling against a background of blinking lights. The casting office was created by silhouetting strips of cardboard against a white background. To depict the protagonist's mental anguish, strips of paper were cut into twisted trees, which were silhouetted against a background of moving shadows and set in motion with an electric fan. To create a scene near the end of the film when the protagonist becomes delirious, the camera moves through a maze of different-sized cubes (with geometric designs inside them) on a flat, shiny surface. Heaven was a miniature set created from paper cubes, tin cans, cigar boxes, toy trains, and a motorized Erector Set. Although no still photos were taken for the film, illustrations of prismatic and kaleidoscopic effects have been obtained by enlarging frames of negative film. The paper prints were considerably softer than the movie print, to avoid graininess. The final film was edited to a one-reel length of 1,200 feet of filmstrip, with about 150 scenes; according to Florey, it had the same number of camera angles as contemporary full-length feature films. Although the film was carefully edited for synchronization with Rhapsody in Blue, much of its original, lyrical quality has been lost in modified versions.

== Themes and interpretation ==
The film is a satire of the social conditions, dominant practices, and ideologies of Hollywood, and the film industry's mistreatment of actors. Filmmaking was becoming more expensive and required greater technical resources (particularly with the rise of sound production), making it increasingly difficult for amateur filmmakers to enter the profession. This deepened a divide between amateurs and Hollywood professionals; as a result, a growing number of amateurs began lampooning Hollywood. The film is about an extra who starts his Hollywood career with hopes and dreams but finds himself used and discarded by the industry, his artistic ambitions destroyed. When it begins, the protagonist has a name (Mr. Jones) and a letter of recommendation outlining his talents; they are ignored and he is reduced to a number, symbolizing his dehumanization.

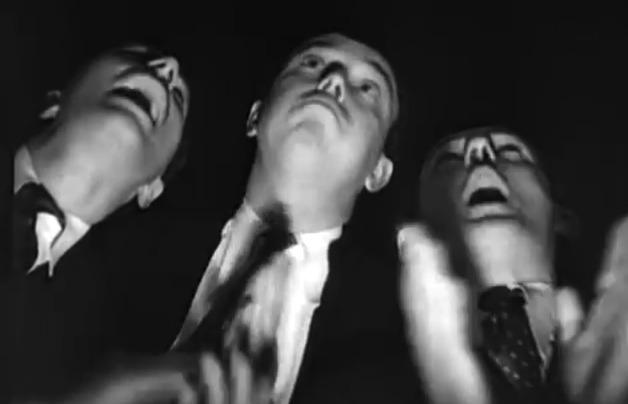
Applause for a performance by Voya George's character

The movie star inspires hero worship in American culture, and the painted masks he dons represent his performances. Actors and audience are depicted as unintelligent automatons, their mouths yapping senselessly as they respond to Hollywood films or hand signals from film directors. One scene loops a shot of a man climbing a staircase toward the word "Success", representing an actor's vain attempt to achieve fulfillment and advancement in his career. Film historians William Moritz and David E. James have compared this to a similar scene with a washerwoman in the Dadaist, post-Cubist film Ballet Mécanique (1924). Other scenes in A Hollywood Extra are frequently repeated, such as views of the city lights and shots of "Hollywood" and "No Casting" signs, which exemplify the protagonist's constant struggle to succeed in Hollywood.

The film's abrupt cuts, artificial scenery, extreme closeups, and twisted angles metaphorically amplify its somber narrative. Film producers and critics in A Hollywood Extra are shot from low angles with dark backdrops, giving the characters a powerful, foreboding appearance. Gregg Toland later used similar camera techniques in Citizen Kane. Closeups of the actors' faces are often shadowed, partially shrouding their features and depriving the characters of wholeness. The all-black backdrops in the closeups remove a real-world presence from the film. When the protagonist is waiting for phone calls with casting decisions, a telephone is superimposed on the actor's forehead to symbolize his growing desperation. His failure follows him to the grave (where the words "No Casting Today" appear next to his tombstone), and his death is symbolized by a pair of scissors cutting a strip of film.

Although the film depicts the protagonist's experience expressionistically, the glamour of Hollywood is portrayed more objectively. According to Taves, by reversing conventional expectations it invites the audience to interpret this version of Hollywood as "the material of dreams" and "an unreal paradise of cruelty and failure". Hollywood street scenes were filmed with a wildly-moving camera from tilted angles, edited into rapid juxtapositions to reflect the falsity and excess of the film industry. The protagonist's trip to heaven at the end of the film is both a satisfying conclusion and a satire of Hollywood's desire for happy endings. Heaven is in the opposite direction from Hollywood, another poke at the industry. James wrote that the image of heaven as an escape from film-industry brutality "figures the avant-garde's recurrent utopian aspirations".

A Hollywood Extra also touches on the mistreatment of women. Although the actors wear masks—symbolizing their ability to act—the female extra #13 does not; she is expected to simply obey the (male) filmmakers, and her only role is as an object for men to look at. Her success in this simple role, contrasted with the protagonist's inability to succeed despite hard work, reveals how differently the film industry views male and female actors.

== Release ==
The Life and Death of 9413: a Hollywood Extra (1928)

Most commonly known by its proper title, The Life and Death of 9413: a Hollywood Extra has been released and advertised as Hollywood Extra 9413 and $97 (a reference to the film's budget). Other titles include The Rhapsody of Hollywood (a name suggested by Charlie Chaplin) and The Suicide of a Hollywood Extra, a misnomer created by distributor FBO Pictures Corporation. Although many experimental films from the period were screened in the filmmakers' homes to audiences of families and friends, A Hollywood Extra had a wide release. Florey described the film at the time:

It is not much. Just about a man who is a fine actor in Iowa or somewhere and who comes to Hollywood and expects to conquer it overnight. ... The would-be idol goes to the studios. ... The casting director, he is merely a hand that rejects or selects. ... And the rest just tells how he loses out all around.

Sources differ about when and where the film premiered. According to film critic Daniel Eagan, Florey premiered the film in a movie club in Los Angeles; according to Anthony Slide, it opened at New York City's Cameo Theatre on June 17, 1928. David E. James said that the film had its true premiere at Charlie Chaplin's Beverly Hills villa. Chaplin, who had become disenchanted with many aspects of Hollywood filmmaking, was so impressed with the film that he watched it five times and screened it for guests at his home. His audience included film-industry elites including Douglas Fairbanks, John Considine, Harry d'Arrast, D. W. Griffith, Jesse L. Lasky, Ernst Lubitsch, Lewis Milestone, Mary Pickford, Joseph M. Schenck, Norma Talmadge, Josef von Sternberg, and King Vidor. Chaplin's screening was accompanied by a record of Rhapsody in Blue and the comedian playing the organ. Florey was so concerned about a negative reaction to the film's satire of Hollywood that he removed his name from the credits and hid in the projection room during the screening. Although the audience originally expected it to be one of Chaplin's gags, they were impressed with the film and Schenck arranged for it to begin screening at a United Artists theater on Broadway on March 21, 1928. A musical score, based on Rhapsody in Blue and played by a live orchestra (featuring the saxophone), was prepared by Hugo Riesenfeld for the showing. With a presentation usually reserved for bigger-budget films, it played twice nightly with the Gloria Swanson film Sadie Thompson and was billed as "the first of the impressionistic photoplays to be made in America".

The film was heavily publicized, with many media reports emphasizing its $97 budget. It received enough notice to be picked up for distribution by FBO Pictures Corporation, which eventually became part of RKO Pictures. The company released A Hollywood Extra to more than 700 theaters in North America and Europe. In North America, it was shown in New York, Hollywood, Philadelphia, Cleveland, Montreal, and Washington, D.C. The film played in Philadelphia with Prem Sanyas (1925), receiving more praise than the main attraction and earning $32 in one week. A Hollywood Extra became one of the first widely-seen American avant-garde films in the United States, the Soviet Union, and Europe (England, France, Germany, and Italy). The French rights for the film and Florey's The Love of Zero (1928) were sold for $390.

Although A Hollywood Extra avoided conventional filmmaking, it was embraced by Hollywood and aided Florey, Vorkapić, and Toland's careers; Vorkapić was offered a special-effects position at Paramount Pictures shortly after the film's release. Paramount wanted to hire Florey for the position, but after Josef von Sternberg said that Vorkapić was primarily responsible for A Hollywood Extra's special effects they offered him the job instead. Film production designer William Cameron Menzies wanted to work with Florey after seeing A Hollywood Extra, so they collaborated on The Love of Zero; Florey directed, and Menzies designed the sets.

== Reception ==
To the extent that The Life and Death of 9413: A Hollywood Extra dramatizes the condition of human life enthralled by and ruined by the entertainment industry, the all-pervading, massively powerful imagery of capital itself, it is the prototypical 20th century avant-garde film.

— David E. James, film historian

The film was well received by contemporary and present-day critics. According to one reviewer, it ranked in cinema "where Gertrude Stein ranks in poetry"; another called Florey "the Eugene O'Neill of the cinema". A 1929 edition of Movie Makers, the official publication of the Amateur Cinema League, called it a triumph of amateur experimentation and an imaginative use of limited resources. In a separate Movie Makers article, Herman G. Weinberg called its scenery "a fantastically beautiful vision of a dream metropolis, done in the expressionistic manner, but done with a fine eye for the camera and the context of the piece". C. Adolph Glassgold, contributing editor of the journal The Arts, called A Hollywood Extra "a truly tremendous picture" and said that Florey could become "the eventual leader of cinematic art": "It has movement, tempo, form, intensity of feeling, highly dramatic moments; in short, it is a real motion picture." In a Film Mercury review, Anabel Lane predicted that Florey would "one day hold a position of one of the bigger film directors": "If this production had been made in Europe and heralded as a hit, it would ... have been called a masterpiece." A Variety reviewer wondered if A Hollywood Extra was "an unannounced foreign-made short", given its stylistic similarity to European art films. Film director Henry King called it "way ahead of its time" and "a stroke of genius": "It was the most original thought I ever saw".

A Hollywood Extra has been praised by modern film historians and critics, who often include it on lists of prominent experimental films. Brian Taves called it a "landmark" of avant-garde film: "A Hollywood Extra was something entirely new, in both style and substance; more than any other American film, it initiated the avant-garde in this country." Film historian William Moritz called it "a genuine little masterpiece" and "perhaps the most famous American experimental film of the 1920s". Colorado State University film professor Hye Seung Chung called the film an "early American avant-garde masterpiece", and described Florey as "one of the most undeservingly neglected B film auteurs". David E. James described it as the "prototypical 20th-century avant-garde film", and A Hollywood Extra's commercial success indicates that experimental films were acceptable to contemporary popular viewers "rather than only an elite or mandarin audience". Director and author Lewis Jacobs wrote, "Its style, broad and impressionistic, disclosed a remarkable sensitivity and resourcefulness in the use of props, painting, camera, and editing."

The full, original film has not survived. In 1997, however, it was selected for preservation in the United States National Film Registry by the Library of Congress as being "culturally, historically, or aesthetically significant". A Hollywood Extra has been restored and released on two DVD collections: Unseen Cinema: Early American Avant Garde Film 1894–1941 (by Image Entertainment) and Avant-Garde: Experimental Cinema of the 1920s and '30s, by Kino International. The British Film Institute commissioned David Sawer to compose a score in 1996; it was first performed by the Matrix Ensemble, conducted by Robert Ziegler. The score, Hollywood Extra, was written for eight musicians and published by Universal Edition.

== Remake ==
The Life and Death of 9413: a Hollywood Extra was remade as Hollywood Boulevard, a 1936 film co-written and directed by Florey. Like A Hollywood Extra, its central character is an actor seeking a job in Hollywood who experiences the cruelty of the film industry and the whims of producers and studio executives. Hollywood Boulevard has visual similarities to the original film, such as unusual angles that reflect Hollywood's disordered nature. It includes several subplots that extend its running time and appeal to mass audiences—but, Brian Taves said, "tend to diminish the importance of the central characterization, depriving Hollywood Boulevard of the singleness of purpose that made A Hollywood Extra so unforgettable".
