= One Hour of Love =

1927 film by Robert Florey

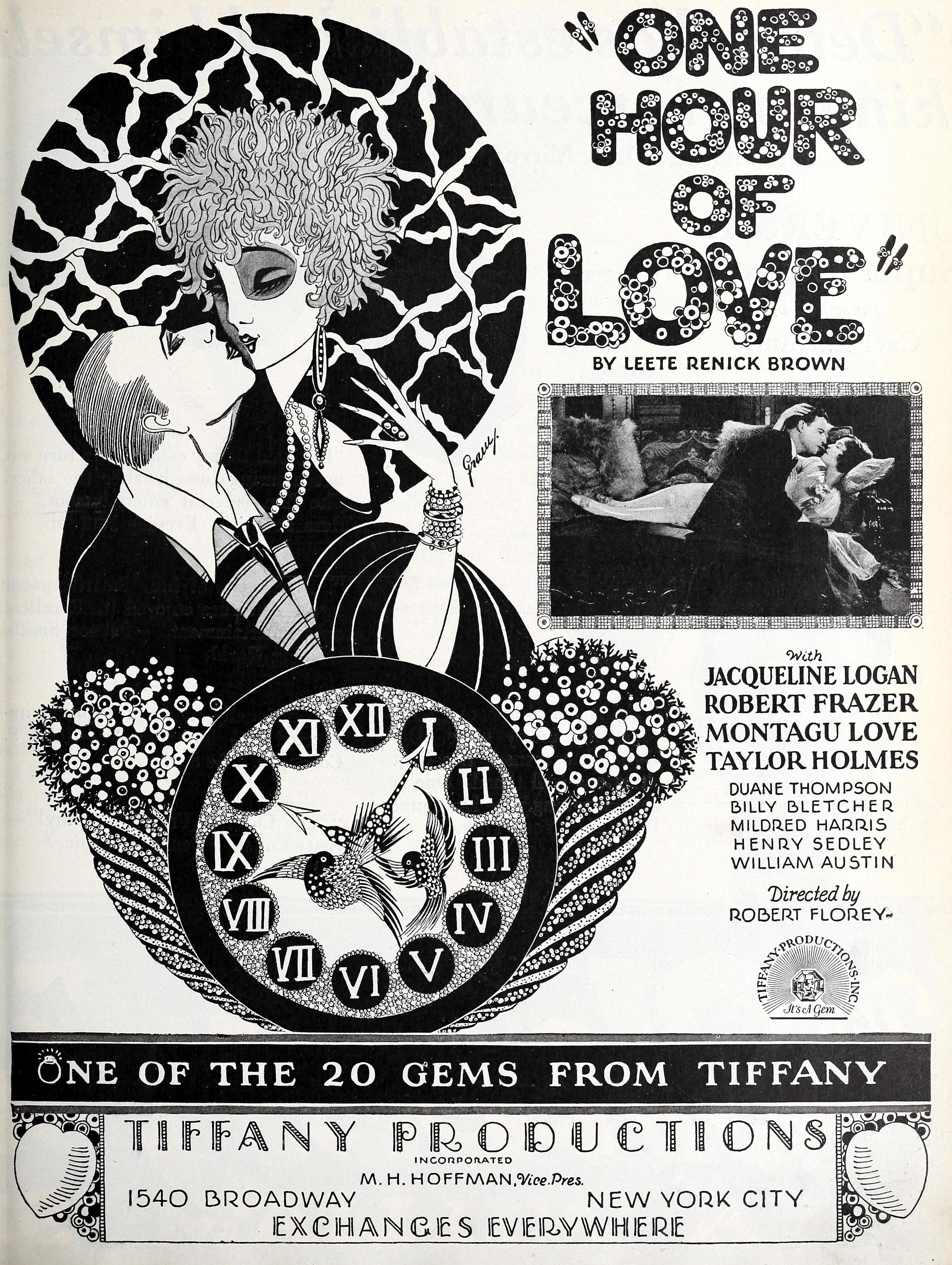
- Directed by: Robert Florey
- Written by: Leete Renick Brown (novel); Emerson Hough; Sarah Y. Mason
- Produced by: M.H. Hoffman
- Starring: Jacqueline Logan; Robert Frazer; Montagu Love
- Cinematography: Milton Moore; Mack Stengler
- Edited by: James C. McKay
- Production company: Tiffany Pictures
- Distributed by: Tiffany Pictures
- Release date: January 15, 1927
- Running time: 70 minutes
- Country: United States
- Languages: Silent; English intertitles

One Hour of Love is a 1927 American silent romantic drama film directed by Robert Florey and starring Jacqueline Logan, Robert Frazer and Montagu Love.

The film's sets were designed by the art director Edwin B. Willis.

== Cast ==
- Jacqueline Logan as 'Jerry' McKay
- Robert Frazer as James Warren
- Montagu Love as J.W. McKay
- Taylor Holmes as Joe Monahan
- Duane Thompson as Neely
- Mildred Harris as Gwen
- Hazel Keener as Vi
- William Austin as Louis Carruthers
- Henry Sedley as Tom Webb
- Billy Bletcher as 'Half Pint' Walker

== Preservation ==
Formerly a lost film, a copy was found and preserved in the National Archives of Canada, Ottawa.

== Bibliography ==
- Munden, Kenneth White. The American Film Institute Catalog of Motion Pictures Produced in the United States, Part 1. University of California Press, 1997.
