= Love Songs (1930 film) =

1930 film directed by Robert Florey

- Directed by: Robert Florey
- Written by: Carl Boese; Jacques Bousquet (play); Henri Falk (play); Robert Florey; Walter Hasenclever; Jean-Charles Reynaud
- Starring: Yolande Laffon; Pierre Bertin; Janine Merrey
- Cinematography: Eduard Hoesch; Otto Kanturek
- Music by: Armand Bernard; Franz Grothe; Artur Guttmann; Eduard Künneke
- Production companies: Harmonie-Film; Les Établissements Braunberger-Richebé
- Distributed by: Les Établissements Braunberger-Richebé
- Release date: 21 November 1930
- Running time: 105 minutes
- Countries: France; Germany
- Language: French

Love Songs (French: L'amour chante) is a 1930 French-German musical film directed by Robert Florey and starring Yolande Laffon, Piere Bertin and Janine Merrey. A separate German-language film, Rendezvous, and a Spanish version, My Wife's Teacher, were also released.

It is "a musical comedy based on the humorous complications created by an adulterous young wife in the lives of everyone around her."

The film was shot in Germany because France was not equipped to produce talkie films of sufficient quality for musicals.

The film's sets were designed by the art directors Marc Allégret and Julius von Borsody.

== Cast ==
- Yolande Laffon as Madame Lherminois
- Pierre Bertin as Claude Merlerault
- Janine Merrey as Loulou, Darling
- Louis Baron fils as Monsieur Lherminois
- Saturnin Fabre as M, Crispin
- Fernand Gravey as Armand Petitjean
- Josseline Gaël as Simone Crespin
- Maryanne as Une mère d'élève
- Renée Montel
- Nicole de Rouves
- Marcelle Monthil as Mlle. Bouclier
- Michéle
- Jim Gérald
- Henri Lesieur
- Florelle

== Bibliography ==
- Powrie, Phil & Rebillard, Éric. Pierre Batcheff and stardom in 1920s French cinema. Edinburgh University Press, 2009.
