= The Road Is Fine =

1930 film

- Directed by: Robert Florey
- Written by: Pierre Wolff
- Produced by: Pierre Braunberger
- Starring: Laurette Fleury; André Baugé; Léon Bary
- Cinematography: Charles Rosher
- Edited by: Lars Moen
- Music by: André Gailhard; Philippe Parès; Joseph Szulc; Georges Van Parys
- Production company: Les Établissements Braunberger-Richebé
- Release date: 24 January 1930
- Country: France
- Language: French

The Road Is Fine (French: La route est belle) is a 1930 French musical film directed by Robert Florey and starring Laurette Fleury, André Baugé and Léon Bary. As no French studios had been converted for sound film, it was shot at Elstree Studios in Britain.

== Cast ==
- Laurette Fleury as Huguette Bouquet
- André Baugé as Tony Landrin
- Léon Bary as Comte Armand Hubert
- Saturnin Fabre as M. Pique
- Tonia Navar as Mme. Delaccarrier
- Pierre Labry as Client de la guinguette
- Pierre Athon as Marchand des quatre saisons
- Mady Berry as Mme. Landrin
- Dorothy Dickson as Dorothy Dickson
- Serge Freddy-Karl as Jacquot
- Léon Belières as Le fripier Samuel Ginsberg

== Bibliography ==
- Marshall, Bill. France and the Americas: Culture, Politics, and History. 2005.
