= The Romantic Age (1927 film) =

1927 film directed by Robert Florey

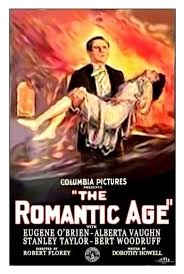
- Directed by: Robert Florey
- Written by: Dorothy Howell
- Produced by: Harry Cohn
- Starring: Eugene O'Brien; Alberta Vaughn; Bert Woodruff
- Cinematography: Norbert Brodine
- Production company: Columbia Pictures
- Distributed by: Columbia Pictures
- Release date: June 5, 1927
- Running time: 56 minutes
- Country: United States
- Languages: Silent; English intertitles

The Romantic Age is a 1927 American silent drama film directed by Robert Florey and starring Eugene O'Brien, Alberta Vaughn and Bert Woodruff.

== Cast ==
- Eugene O'Brien as Stephen
- Alberta Vaughn as Sally
- Bert Woodruff as Tom
- Stanley Taylor

== Preservation and status ==
A complete copy of the film is held at the Museum of Modern Art.

== Bibliography ==
- Munden, Kenneth White. The American Film Institute Catalog of Motion Pictures Produced in the United States, Part 1. University of California Press, 1997.
