= I Sell Anything =

1934 film by Robert Florey

- Directed by: Robert Florey
- Written by: Brown Holmes; Sidney Sutherland
- Story by: Albert J. Cohen; Robert T. Shannon
- Produced by: Samuel Bischoff (uncredited)
- Starring: Pat O'Brien; Ann Dvorak; Claire Dodd
- Cinematography: Sidney Hickox
- Production company: First National Pictures
- Distributed by: Warner Bros. Pictures
- Release date: October 20, 1934
- Running time: 74 minutes
- Country: United States
- Language: English

I Sell Anything is a 1934 American film directed by Robert Florey and starring Pat O'Brien, Ann Dvorak, and Claire Dodd. It was produced by First National Pictures and distributed by Warner Bros. Pictures.

O'Brien plays Spot Cash Cutler, a "smooth swindler" of phony jewels and antiques. Two women compete for Cutler's attention: Barbara (Dvorak), a waif; and Millicent Clark (Dodd), a rich girl.

== Cast ==
- Pat O'Brien as Spot Cash Cutler
- Ann Dvorak as Barbara
- Claire Dodd as Millicent Clark
- Roscoe Karns as Monk
- Hobart Cavanaugh as First Stooge
- Russell Hopton as Smiley Thompson
- Robert Barrat as McPherson
- Harry Tyler as Second Stooge
- Gus Shy as Third Stooge
- Leonard Carey as Chauffeur
- Ferdinand Gottschalk as Barouche
- Clay Clement as Peter Van Gruen
- Herman Bing as Bidder (uncredited)
- Gino Corrado as Waiter (uncredited)
