= Bert Woodruff =

American actor (1856–1934)

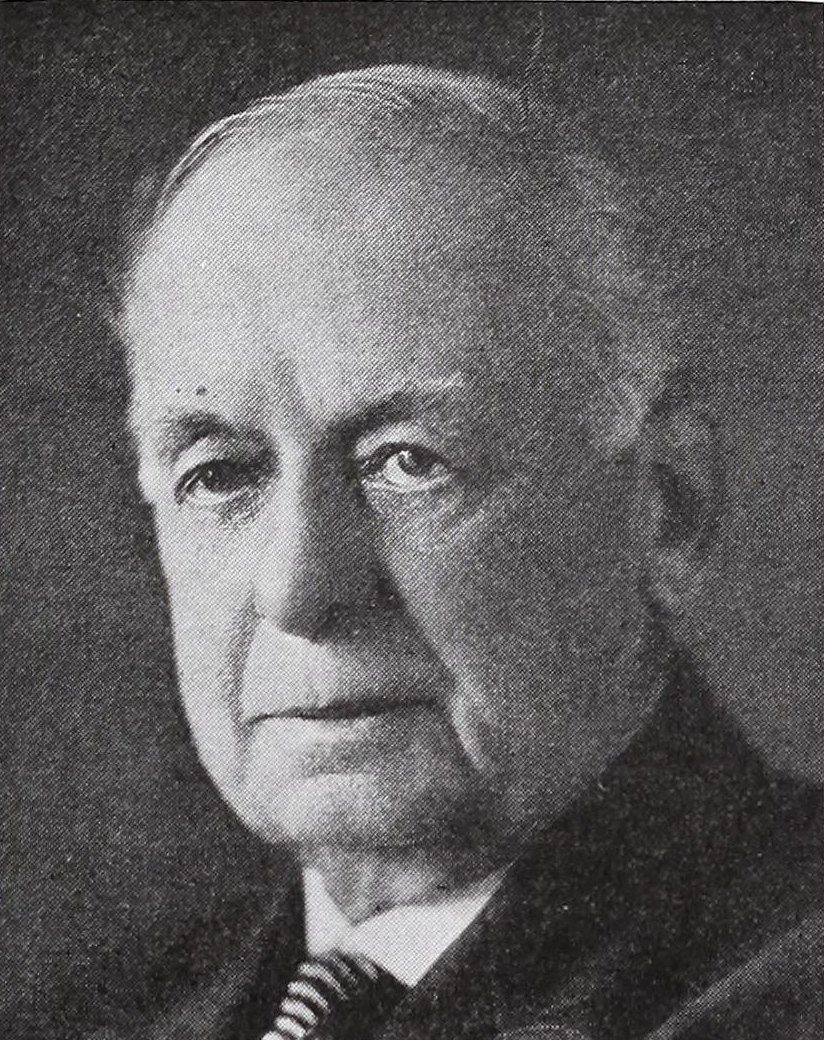
- Born: William Herbert Woodruff; April 29, 1856; Peoria, Illinois, US
- Died: June 14, 1934 (aged 78); Los Angeles, California, US
- Years active: 1916–1931

William Herbert "Bert" Woodruff (April 29, 1856 – June 14, 1934) was an American actor of the silent era.

Woodruff was born in Peoria, Illinois, and was the son of Mrs. Hannah Woodruff. He performed on stage before he began acting on film, debuting in 1876 as part of the Woodruff and West song-and-dance act. His performances included blackface comedy and Irish specialties. In 1882, he became part of the Adelphi Theater stock company in Peoria, where he worked for seven years.

In 1898, Woodruff moved into management, opening a vaudeville theater in Peoria and managing it until 1904. From there he went to Redondo Beach, California, where he opened the city's first theater for films. He appeared in more than 60 films between 1916 and 1931. He remains perhaps best known for playing the grandfather in the 1928 Harold Lloyd comedy Speedy.

Woodruff died of nephritis in Hollywood, California, aged 78.

== Selected filmography ==
- Jim Bludso (1917)
- A Love Sublime (1917)
- Hands Up! (1917)
- The Delicious Little Devil (1919)
- Bill Henry (1919)
- The Jailbird (1920)
- For Those We Love (1921)
- The Grim Comedian (1921)
- See My Lawyer (1921)
- Two Minutes to Go (1921)
- Watch Your Step (1922)
- Making a Man (1922)
- The Rosary (1922)
- The Isle of Lost Ships (1923)
- The Silent Partner (1923)
- The Six-Fifty (1923)
- A Noise in Newboro (1923)
- Children of Dust (1923)
- The Sea Hawk (1924)
- The Siren of Seville (1924)
- Flowing Gold (1924)
- The Mine with the Iron Door (1924)
- Paths to Paradise (1925)
- Some Pun'kins (1925)
- The Vanishing American (1925)
- The Fighting Heart (1925)
- Driftin' Thru (1926)
- The Barrier (1926)
- The Fire Brigade (1926)
- Eyes of the Totem (1927)
- The Life of Riley (1927)
- Spring Fever (1927)
- Lure of the Night Club (1927)
- The Romantic Age (1927)
- Speedy (1928)
- Marked Money (1928)
- The Shopworn Angel (1928)
- The River (1929)
- A Song of Kentucky (1929)
- Laughing Sinners (1931) as Tink
- The Texas Ranger (1931)
