= A Happy Man (1932 film) =

1932 film

- Directed by: Antonin Bideau
- Written by: Jacques Bousquet
- Cinematography: Paul Portier
- Distributed by: United Artists
- Release date: 1932
- Running time: 87 minutes
- Country: France
- Language: French

A Happy Man (French: Un homme heureux) is a 1932 French film directed by Antonin Bideau. It is considered to be a lost film.

== Cast ==
- Henri Bosc as Michel Guérard
- Jacques Bousquet
- Suzanne Christy as Simone Fontanet
- Suzanne Dantès as Liouba Grebinsky
- Claude Dauphin as Claude Moreuil
- Lucette Desmoulins as Lulu
- Alice Tissot as Madame Fontanet
- Georges Tréville as Monsieur Pédoux

== Bibliography ==
- Waldman, Harry. Missing Reels: Lost Films of American and European Cinema. McFarland, 2000.
