= The Foreigner (1931 film) =

1931 film

- Directed by: Gaston Ravel
- Written by: Gaston Ravel
- Based on: The Foreigner by Alexandre Dumas fils
- Produced by: Jean de La Cour; Liddy Hegewald
- Starring: Fernand Fabre; Elvire Popesco; Henri Debain
- Cinematography: Léonce-Henri Burel
- Production companies: Films Jean de la Cour; Hegewald Film
- Distributed by: Les Films Osso
- Release date: 6 February 1931
- Running time: 88 minutes
- Country: France
- Language: French

The Foreigner (French: L'étrangère) is a 1931 French drama film directed by Gaston Ravel and starring Fernand Fabre, Elvire Popesco and Henri Debain. It is based on the 1876 play of the same title by Alexandre Dumas fils. It was shot at the Epinay Studios in Paris. The film's sets were designed by the art directors Lazare Meerson, Jacques Colombier and Tony Lekain. Separate German (The Stranger) and Italian-language versions were also produced.

== Cast ==
- Fernand Fabre as Le duc de Septmonts
- Elvire Popesco as Dora Clarkson
- Henri Debain as Mister Clarkson
- Cady Winter as La duchesse de Septmonts
- Tonia Navar as La métisse
- Max Maxudian as Le colon
- Olga Day as La suivante
- Émile Drain as Mauriceau
- Jean Gérard as Gérard

== Bibliography ==
- Bessy, Maurice & Chirat, Raymond. Histoire du cinéma français: 1929-1934. Pygmalion, 1988.
- Crisp, Colin. Genre, Myth and Convention in the French Cinema, 1929-1939. Indiana University Press, 2002.
- Goble, Alan. The Complete Index to Literary Sources in Film. Walter de Gruyter, 1999.
- Rège, Philippe. Encyclopedia of French Film Directors, Volume 1. Scarecrow Press, 2009.
