= The Payoff (1935 film) =

1935 American dramatic film directed by Robert Florey

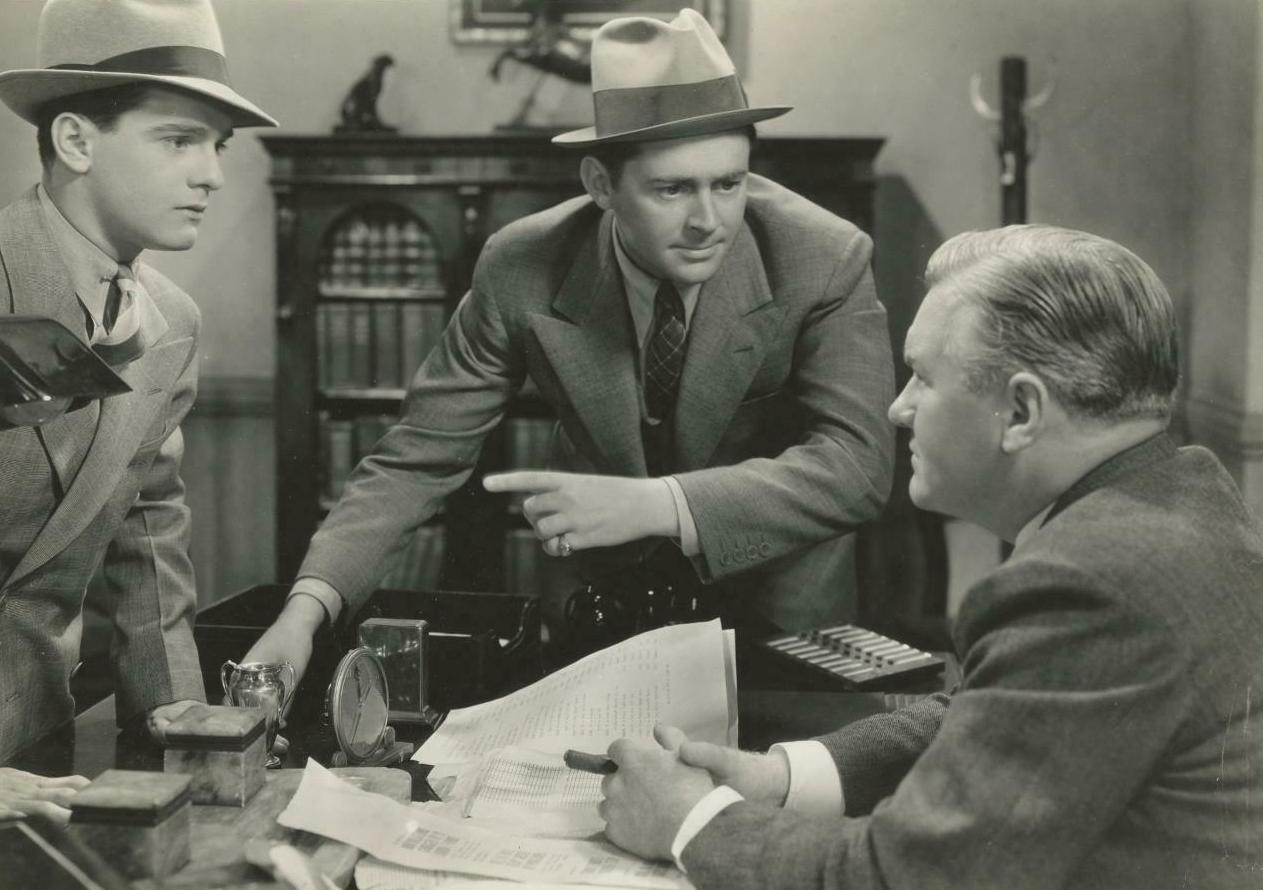
- (L. to r.) Frankie Darro, James Dunn, and Joseph Crehan in a scene from the film
- Directed by: Robert Florey
- Cinematography: Arthur L. Todd
- Edited by: Harold McLernon
- Distributed by: Warner Bros. Pictures
- Release date: November 9, 1935
- Running time: 64 minutes
- Country: United States
- Language: English

The Payoff is a 1935 American dramatic film directed by Robert Florey and starring James Dunn.

== Plot ==
A newspaper reporter is promoted to the sports desk but saddled with a wife whose spending habits drive her into a relationship with a blackmailing racketeer.

== Cast ==
- James Dunn as Joe McCoy
- Claire Dodd as Maxine McCoy
- Patricia Ellis as Connie Travers
- Alan Dinehart as Marty Bleuler
- Joseph Crehan as Harvey Morris
- Frankie Darro as Jimmy Moore
- Frank Sheridan as George Gorman
- Al Hill as Mike
- Paul Porcasi as Nick
- George Chandler as Reporter
