= His Tiger Lady =

1928 film

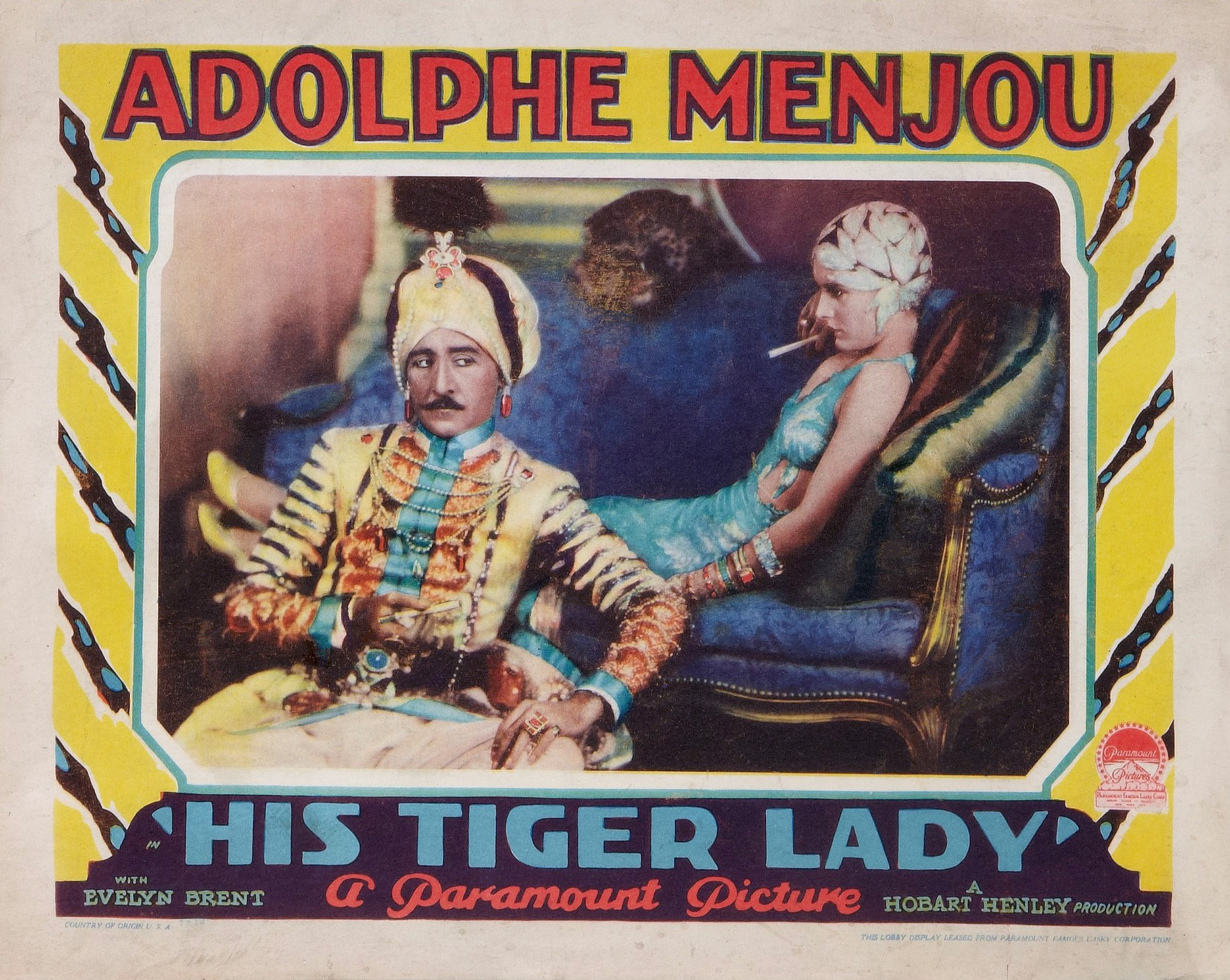
- Lobby card
- Directed by: Hobart Henley
- Screenplay by: Ernest Vajda; Herman J. Mankiewicz (titles)
- Based on: Super of the Gaiety by Alfred Savoir
- Produced by: Jesse L. Lasky; Adolph Zukor
- Starring: Adolphe Menjou; Evelyn Brent; Rose Dione; Émile Chautard
- Cinematography: Harry Fischbeck
- Edited by: Alyson Shaffer
- Production company: Famous Players–Lasky Corporation
- Distributed by: Paramount Pictures
- Release date: May 27, 1928
- Running time: 60 minutes
- Country: United States
- Language: Silent (English intertitles)

His Tiger Lady is a lost 1928 American silent drama film directed by Hobart Henley and written by Herman J. Mankiewicz, Alfred Savoir, and Ernest Vajda. The film stars Adolphe Menjou, Evelyn Brent, Rose Dione, Émile Chautard, Mario Carillo, and Leonardo De Vesa. The film was released on May 27, 1928, by Paramount Pictures.

== Plot ==
As described in a pressbook for the film, Henri works at the Folies Bergère and has a part dressed as a Maharaja in a Hindu tableau. As he sits on an elephant, he sketches the profile of the beautiful Tiger Lady, who sits each night in a box with three admirers. From his attitude, he is hopelessly in love with her. She is known as the Tiger Lady for her passion for tigers, and at each evening performance she pays no heed of the performance until the tiger act comes on.

The other cast members see Henri's love for the lady, and the Stage Manager forges a letter from her to Henri. Henri cannot believe his luck, and after the show he puts on his suit and leaves to meet his love. However, when he reaches the door and opens it, he is met with a deluge of water, and his suit is ruined. Crestfallen, he changes into his costume and leaves.

At a restaurant, the Tiger Lady is dining with her three admirers when Henri walks in dressed as a Rajah. Waiters flock around him, and he points to her table, saying that he always dines with the most beautiful woman in the place. When he is seated, the Tiger Lady shows that she is attracted to him. Henri orders everything in sight, and when the Duke insists on paying, Henri permits him.

Henri accompanies the Tiger Lady to her hotel. In her room she tells him that he must prove his love by entering a tiger's cage and retrieving her glove. Her past three admirers had failed this at the critical moment. Henri is nonplussed but determined to go through with it. By a stroke of fortune, the tiger has died that night, and Henri enters the cage, puts his foot on the animal, and strikes a pose for the lady. She is enthralled by his courage.

Henri sees that the Tiger Lady loves only the man she thinks he is. He tells her that the tiger was dead. She does not believe him. He then admits that he is only an actor, not deserving of her love with her station in life, and leaves. The next day, Henri at rehearsal sees a new woman in the chorus, revealed as the Tiger Lady. Having come down to his level, there is nothing more to do than for them to accept each other.

== Cast ==
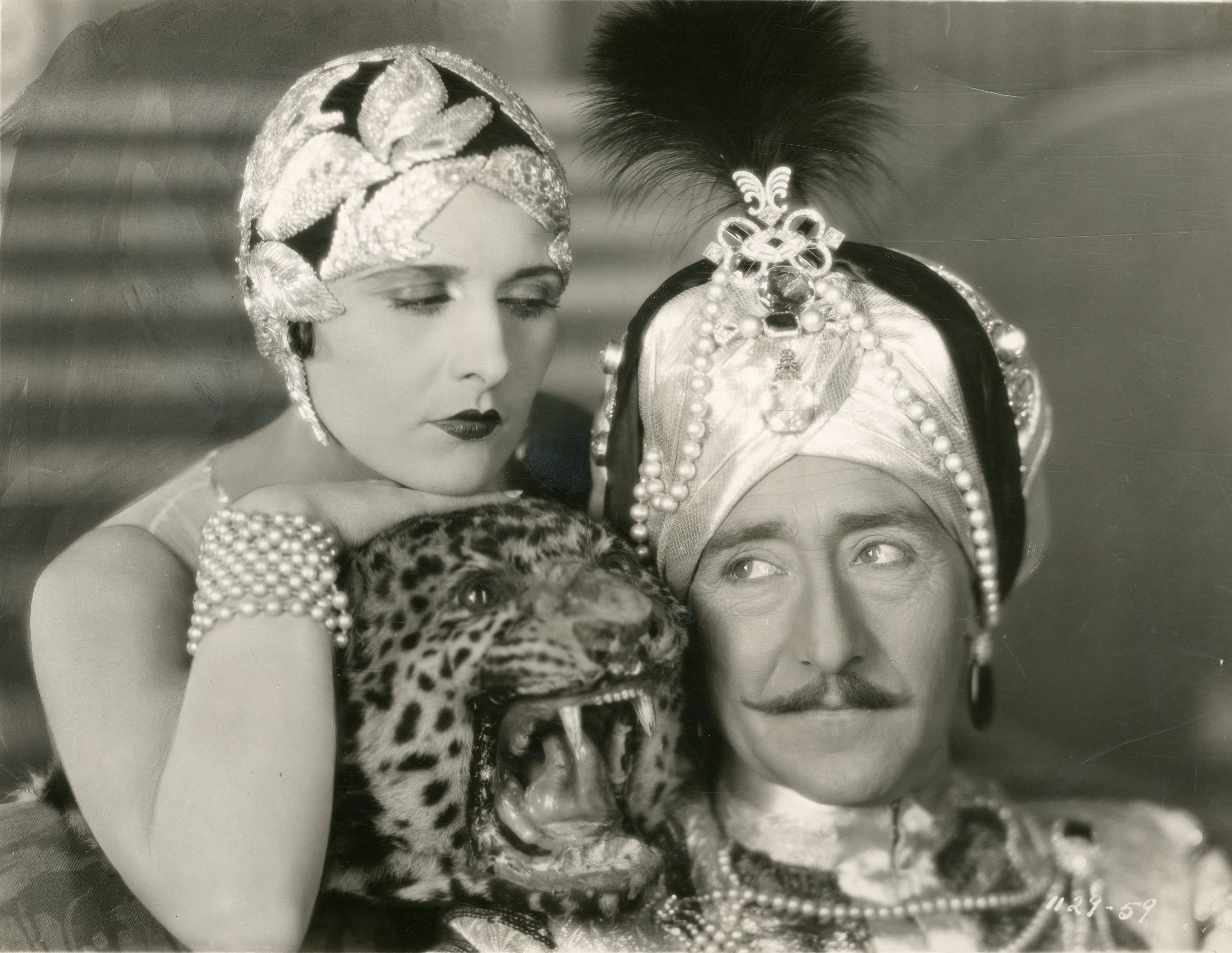
Film still with Brent and Menjou

- Adolphe Menjou as Henri
- Evelyn Brent as The Tiger Lady
- Rose Dione as Madame Duval
- Émile Chautard as Stage Manager
- Mario Carillo as The Duke
- Leonardo De Vesa as The Count
- Jules Raucourt as The Marquis
