= The Florentine Dagger =

1935 film by Robert Florey

- Theatrical release poster
- Directed by: Robert Florey
- Written by: Brown Holmes (add'l dialogue)
- Screenplay by: Tom Reed
- Based on: The Florentine Dagger (1923 novel) by Ben Hecht
- Starring: Donald Woods; Margaret Lindsay
- Cinematography: Arthur L. Todd
- Edited by: Thomas Pratt
- Music by: Bernhard Kaun
- Production company: Warner Bros. Pictures
- Distributed by: Warner Bros. Pictures
- Release date: March 30, 1935 (U.S.)
- Running time: 69 minutes
- Country: United States
- Language: English
- Budget: $130,000
- Box office: $260,000

The Florentine Dagger is a 1935 American film noir mystery film directed by Robert Florey.

The film numbers among the first Hollywood movies in which psychoanalysis is a significant factor in the story.

== Plot ==
Juan Cesare is a descendant of the Borgia line and convinced that he has inherited their murderous tendencies. Suspicions deepen when the father of the girl he loves turns up stabbed to death with a Florentine dagger.

== Cast ==
- Donald Woods as Juan Cesare
- Margaret Lindsay as Florence Ballau
- C. Aubrey Smith as Dr. Lytton
- Henry O'Neill as Victor Ballau
- Robert Barrat as Inspector Von Brinkner
- Florence Fair as Teresa Holspar
- Frank Reicher as Stage Manager
- Charles Judels as Hotel Proprietor
- Rafaela Ottiano as Lili Salvatore
- Paul Porcasi as Italian policeman
- Eily Malyon as Fredericka, mask maker
- Egon Brecher as Lytton's butler
- Herman Bing as The baker
- Henry Kolker as The auctioneer

== Box Office ==
According to Warner Bros records the film earned $185,000 domestically and $75,000 foreign.
