= Paris-New York-Paris =

1928 film

- Directed by: Robert Péguy
- Written by: Jacques Bousquet; Henri Falk
- Starring: Marcel Vibert; Colette Darfeuil
- Cinematography: Roger Hubert; Joseph-Louis Mundwiller
- Production company: Etablissements Louis Aubert
- Release date: 25 December 1928
- Country: France
- Languages: Silent; French intertitles

Paris-New York-Paris is a 1928 French silent comedy adventure film directed by Robert Péguy and starring Marcel Vibert and Colette Darfeuil.

== Synopsis ==
An idle man is spurred into action by the thought of becoming an aviator and beating Charles Lindbergh's new record. He runs into mechanical difficulties but is assisted by the beautiful Jacqueline with whom he falls in love. After realising she is married he finds himself falling for the American Jessie Snowden.

== Cast ==
- Marcel Vibert as Maurice Francoeur
- Colette Darfeuil as Jessie Snowden
- Diana Hart as Jacqueline Francoeur
- Giulio Del Torre as Raoul d'Estre
- Germaine Noizet
- Hélène d'Or

== See also ==
- Lindbergh Boom

== Bibliography ==
- Rège, Philippe. Encyclopedia of French Film Directors, Volume 1. Scarecrow Press, 2009.
