= My Wife's Teacher =

1930 film directed by Robert Florey

- Directed by: Robert Florey
- Written by: Carl Boese; Jacques Bousquet (play); Henri Falk (play); Robert Florey; José Luis Salado
- Produced by: Pierre Braunberger
- Starring: Imperio Argentina
- Cinematography: Eduard Hoesch; Otto Kanturek
- Music by: Armand Bernard; Franz Grothe; Artur Guttmann; Eduard Künneke; Amadeo Vives
- Production companies: Cinaes; Harmonie-Film; Les Établissements Braunberger-Richebé; Renacimiento Films
- Distributed by: Cinaes
- Release date: 31 October 1930
- Running time: 85 minutes
- Country: France /Germany /Spain
- Language: Spanish

My Wife's Teacher (Spanish: El profesor de mi mujer, El profesor de mi señora or El amor solfeando) is a 1930 comedy film directed by Robert Florey, and starring Imperio Argentina. It was made as the Spanish-language version of the German film Rendezvous. Such multi-language versions were common during the early years of sound. A separate French version as also released as Love Songs. The film's sets were designed by Julius von Borsody.

Both the French film and this Spanish version were shot in Germany, in Berlin, in the UFA studios.

Vicente Romero indicates that Armand Guerra also participated in the making of the film. Brian Taves credits Florey only for "supervising" the direction.

== Cast ==
- Imperio Argentina
- Florelle
- Julia Lajos
- Valentín Parera
- Luis Torrecilla

== Bibliography ==
- Comas, Àngel. Diccionari de llargmetratges. Cossetània Edicions, 2005. ISBN 84-9791-096-6
