= Rendezvous (1930 film) =

1930 film directed by Carl Boese

- Directed by: Carl Boese
- Written by: Carl Boese; Jacques Bousquet (play); Henri Falk (play); Robert Florey; Menne Freudenberg; Walter Hasenclever; Armin Robinson
- Starring: Lucie Englisch; Ralph Arthur Roberts; Alexa Engström
- Cinematography: Eduard Hoesch; Otto Kanturek
- Music by: Artur Guttmann
- Production company: Harmonie-Film
- Distributed by: Rosenfeld Film
- Release date: 29 August 1930
- Running time: 90 minutes
- Country: Germany
- Language: German

Rendezvous (German: Komm' zu mir zum Rendezvous) is a 1930 German musical film directed by Carl Boese and starring Lucie Englisch, Ralph Arthur Roberts and Alexa Engström. Separate versions were made in French (Love Songs) and Spanish (My Wife's Teacher). Such multi-language versions were common in the early years of sound. Dialogues were written by Walter Hasenclever. It was shot at the Babelsberg Studios in Potsdam. The film's sets were designed by the art director Julius von Borsody.

== Cast ==
- Lucie Englisch as Yvonne
- Ralph Arthur Roberts as Leon
- Alexa Engström as Antoinette
- Walter Rilla as Armand
- S.Z. Sakall as Crepin
- Paul Morgan as Weber, Portier
- Fritz Schulz as Claude
- Margarete Kupfer as Frau Schild - Pianistin
- Trude Lieske]as Lulu

== Bibliography ==
- Parish, James Robert; Canham, Kingsley (1976). Film Directors Guide: Western Europe. Scarecrow Press. ISBN 978-0-8108-0908-6.
