= Mannequins (film) =

1933 film

- Directed by: René Hervil
- Based on: Mannequins by Henri Falk; Jacques Bousquet
- Produced by: Jacques Haïk
- Starring: Noël-Noël; Gaby Basset; Paul Amiot
- Cinematography: Paul Cotteret
- Edited by: André Versein
- Music by: Joseph Szulc
- Production company: Les Établissements Jacques Haïk
- Distributed by: Les Établissements Jacques Haïk
- Release date: 14 July 1933
- Running time: 80 minutes
- Country: France
- Language: French

Mannequins is a 1933 French comedy film directed by René Hervil and starring Noël-Noël, Gaby Basset and Paul Amiot. It was based on the 1925 operetta of the same name by Henri Falk and Jacques Bousquet. The film's sets were designed by the art director Jean d'Eaubonne.

== Synopsis ==
Alfred, a glove salesman, falls asleep at his counter one night. He dreams that the various wax models come to life, and falls for one of them who resembles the girl he loves.

== Cast ==
- Noël-Noël as Alfred
- Gaby Basset as Rose
- Paul Amiot as L'inspecteur
- Pierre Juvenet as Le marquis
- Arielle as Trianon
- Edmée Favart as Micheline / Fleur de Pêcher
- René Hiéronimus as Le vicomte
- Sylviane Mancel as Soeurette
- Moriss as White Lotus
- Ketty Pierson as Une vendeuse

== Bibliography ==
- Bessy, Maurice & Chirat, Raymond. Histoire du cinéma français: 1929-1934. Pygmalion, 1988.
- Crisp, Colin. Genre, Myth and Convention in the French Cinema, 1929-1939. Indiana University Press, 2002.
- Goble, Alan. The Complete Index to Literary Sources in Film. Walter de Gruyter, 1999.
- Rège, Philippe. Encyclopedia of French Film Directors, Volume 1. Scarecrow Press, 2009.
