= Outcast (1937 film) =

1937 American film by Robert Florey

- Directed by: Robert Florey
- Written by: Doris Malloy; Dore Schary
- Story by: Frank R. Adams
- Produced by: Emanuel Cohen
- Cinematography: Rudolph Maté
- Edited by: Ray Curtiss
- Music by: Ernst Toch
- Distributed by: Paramount Pictures
- Release date: February 5, 1937
- Running time: 73 minutes
- Country: United States
- Language: English

Outcast is a 1937 American drama film directed by Robert Florey. Unusually for Florey, this was an independent production (Emanuel Cohen Productions, billed as "Major Pictures Corporation") released through Paramount Pictures.

== Plot ==
Warren William plays a Baltimore doctor accused of murder. Although acquitted, he becomes a pariah and his practice is ruined, so he transplants himself to a small Wisconsin town. Confiding with a sympathetic retired lawyer (Lewis Stone), the doctor just begins to build back his practice, his self-respect, and a relationship with a local girl (Karen Morley) when his past follow him in the form of the avenging sister of the murder victim.

== Cast ==
- Warren William as Dr. Wendell Phillips / Phil Jones
- Karen Morley as Margaret Stevens
- Lewis Stone as Anthony Abbott
- Jackie Moran as Freddie Simmerson
- John Wray as Hank Simmerson
- Esther Dale as Hattie Simmerson
- Christian Rub as Olaf, the Valet
- Virginia Sale as Jessica Tuite
- Ruth Robinson as Mrs. Scutter
- Murray Kinnell as Anthony 'Tony' Stevens
- Harry Woods as Grant, the Head Lyncher
- Richard Carle as Mooney
- Matthew Betz as Don, a Townsman
