= Skyscraper Symphony =

1929 film by Robert Florey

- Directed by: Robert Florey
- Release date: 1929
- Running time: 9 minutes
- Country: United States
- Language: Silent

Skyscraper Symphony (1929) is an avant-garde silent short film by French-American filmmaker Robert Florey. The film was shot in the early morning hours in New York City. It captured skyscrapers which, by the late 1920s had become a global trademark of the city and became a representation of the ever-developing technologies in America, as well as the rapid growth of capitalism. Florey's focus on the booming metropolitan in the post-World War I era has solidified this film as a "city symphony," and he draws upon his own experience as a tourist in America to capture the excitement and uncertainty of being in New York City.

== Synopsis ==
Skyscraper Symphony (1929)

The film consists of a sequence of low-angle shots of skyscrapers in Manhattan. The beginning and end of the film's shots are primarily static, with one shot fading slowly into the next. The middle portion of the film has abrupt and rapid cuts between shots, with the camera capturing the buildings in shaky, canted movements.

== Reception ==
Musicologist Hannah Lewis has compared the "striking angles, zooms, panning, and unsteady camera angles" which "disorient" viewers of Skyscraper Symphony to techniques used by montage theorists.

== Bibliography ==
- Jacobs, Steven; Kinik, Anthony; Hielscher, Eva (2019). The city symphony phenomenon: cinema, art, and urban modernity between the wars. AFI film readers. New York [New York]: Routledge, Taylor & Francis Group. ISBN 978-1-138-66527-9.
