= André Baugé =

French opera singer

André Gaston Baugé (4 January 1893, Toulouse - 25 May 1966, Clichy-la-Garenne) was a French baritone, active in opera and operetta, who also appeared in films in the 1930s.

== Life and career ==
The son of Alphonse Baugé, a vocal teacher, and Anna Tariol-Baugé a soprano active in operetta, he studied with his parents and appeared in the French provinces billed as André Grilland.

He made his debut at the Paris Opéra-Comique as Frédéric in Lakmé in 1917. A pensionnaire at the Opéra-Comique until 1925, he appeared as Clément Marot in La Basoche, Sylvanus in Au Beau Jardin de France, Figaro in Le Barbier de Séville, Escamillo in Carmen, Alfio in Cavalleria Rusticana, Don Giovanni, Clavaroche in Fortunio, Lescaut in Manon, the title role in Mârouf, savetier du Caire, Ourrias in Mireille, Jean in Les noces de Jeannette, Silvio in Paillasse, Pelléas, d’Orbel in La Traviata, Marcel in La boheme, and Albert in Werther. He sang in the first performances at the Salle Favart of Béatrice, Masques et Bergamasques and Véronique., and in 1925 at the Opéra played Germont in Traviata and the title role in Mârouf, having been heard as Escamillo also in Monte Carlo the previous year.

In 1925 he sang in the French premiere of Monsieur Beaucaire and moved into the field of comédie musicale and Viennese operetta. A succession of appearances in that genre followed: Venise (alongside his mother) in 1927, Paganini in 1928, Vouvray in 1929 (for which he wrote the text), Le Clown amoureux in 1929, Robert le Pirate in 1929, Cinésonor in 1930 (also writing the text), Nina-Rosa in 1931, Valses de Vienne in 1933, Au temps des Merveilleuses in 1934, Au soleil du Mexique in 1935 and Le Chant du tzigane in 1937.

On film he appeared in La Route est belle, one of the first films with sound (1929–1930, music by Szulc) and other films up to 1935 when he returned to the theatre. As well as contributing to the books of several productions (Vouvray, Cinésonor) he designed the cover for the score of Venise by Richepin. He was for a time the director of the Trianon-Lyrique in Paris.

He was the author of the libretto of an opéra-bouffe in three acts entitled tableaux Beaumarchais, using Rossini's music arranged by Eugène Cools (1877-1936), which was premiered at the Théâtre des Variétés in Marseille in 1931. After the war he taught at the École Normale, returning to the theatre in 1958 as Johann Strauss senior in Valses de Vienne. He left recordings of songs from many of his roles, and some of these have been re-issued on CD.

== Family ==
His wife was the singer Suzanna Laydeker (who also appeared as Laydeker-Baugé and died in 1980).

== Filmography ==
- The Flower of the Indies (1921)
- A Caprice of Pompadour (1930)
- La route est belle (1930)
- Petit Officier... Adieu ! (1930)
- The Little Cafe (1931)
- La Ronde des heures (1931)
- Pour un sou d'amour (1932)
- The Barber of Seville (1933)
- The Guardian Angel (1934)
- La Route heureuse (1935)
- Story of a Poor Young Man (1935)
- Madame Angot's Daughter (1935)
