= La Tosca (1918 film) =

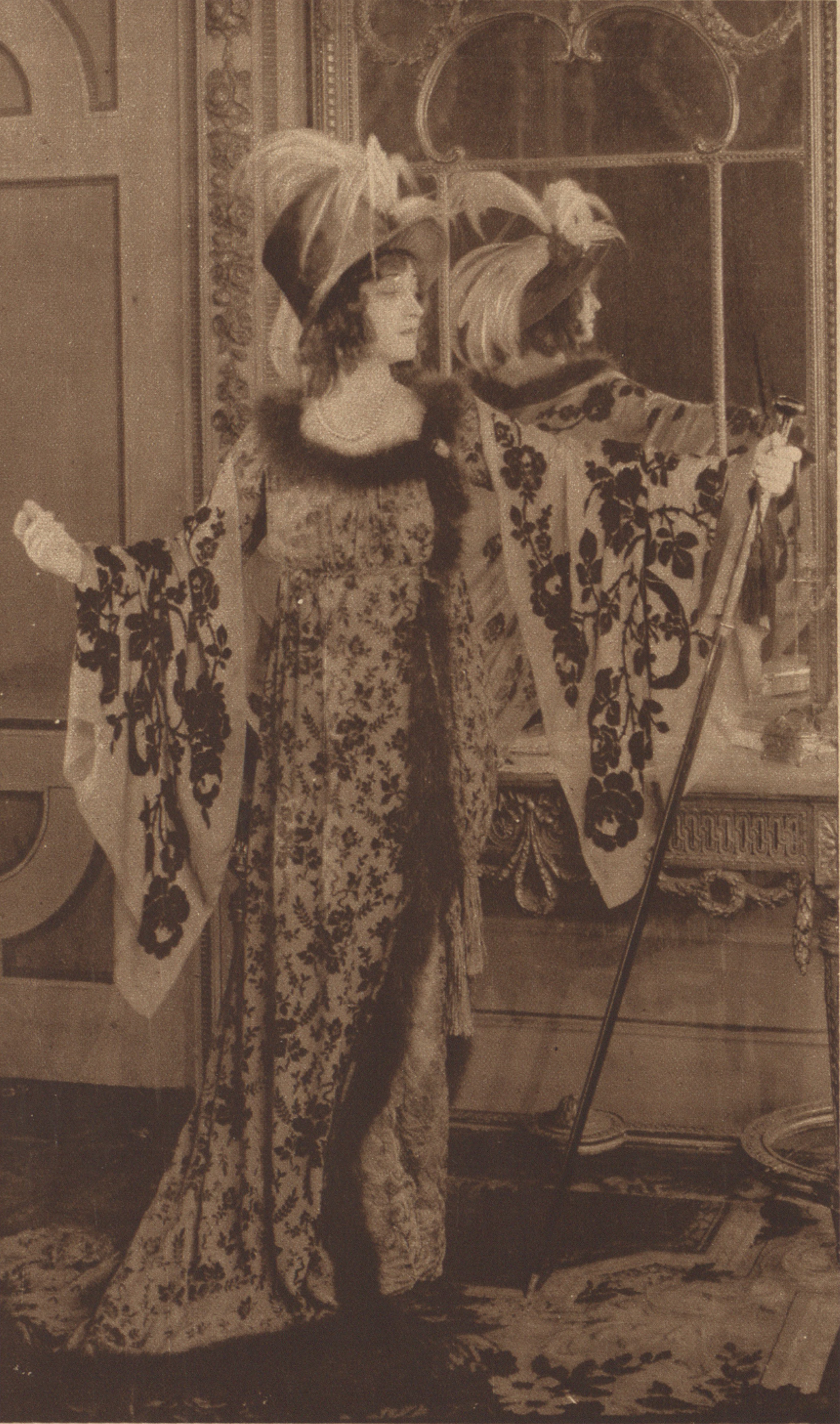
- Pauline Frederick as Floria Tosca
- Directed by: Edward José
- Screenplay by: Charles E. Whittaker
- Based on: La Tosca by Victorien Sardou
- Produced by: Adolph Zukor
- Starring: Pauline Frederick; Frank Losee; Jules Raucourt; Henry Hebert; W.H. Forestelle
- Cinematography: Ned Van Buren
- Music by: Hugo Riesenfeld
- Production company: Famous Players–Lasky Corporation
- Distributed by: Paramount Pictures
- Release date: March 25, 1918
- Running time: 50 minutes
- Country: United States
- Language: English

La Tosca is a 1918 American drama silent film directed by Edward José and written by Charles E. Whittaker after the play La Tosca by Victorien Sardou. The film stars Pauline Frederick, Frank Losee, Jules Raucourt, Henry Hebert and W.H. Forestelle. Some of the film was shot on location in Jacksonville and Fort Marion, Florida. The film was released on March 25, 1918, by Paramount Pictures.

Another film adaptation of the play was made in Italy in the same year, starring Francesca Bertini.

== Cast ==
- Pauline Frederick as Floria Tosca
- Frank Losee as Baron Scarpia
- Jules Raucourt as Mario Cavaradossi
- Henry Hebert as Cesare Angelotti (*aka Henry Herbert)
- W.H. Forestelle as Spoletti

== Preservation ==
La Tosca is currently presumed lost. In February of 2021, the film was cited by the National Film Preservation Board on their Lost U.S. Silent Feature Films list.
