= Hollywood Unknowns =

2012 book by Anthony Slide

- First edition
- Author: Anthony Slide
- Language: English
- Genre: Non-fiction
- Publisher: University Press of Mississippi
- Publication date: 2012
- Publication place: United States

Hollywood Unknowns: A History of Extras, Bit Players, and Stand-Ins is a 2012 English non-fiction book written by Anthony Slide about the relatively unknown actors of cinema of the United States.
