= Jacques Bousquet =

French actor and screenwriter

- Occupation: Actor
- Years active: 1923–1938 (film)

Jacques Bousquet was a French actor and screenwriter.

== Selected filmography ==
- Dancing Mad (1925)
- A Gentleman of the Ring (1926)
- Paris-New York-Paris (1928)
- Rendezvous (1930)
- Love Songs (1930)
- My Wife's Teacher (1930)
- A Gentleman of the Ring (1932)
- The Regiment's Champion (1932)
- To the Polls, Citizens (1932)
- A Happy Man (1932)
- Court Waltzes (1933)
- Mannequins (1933)
- Idylle au Caire (1933)
- Night in May (1934)
- Stradivarius (1935)
- Under Western Eyes (1936)
- The Brighton Twins (1936)

== Bibliography ==
- Waldman, Harry. Missing Reels: Lost Films of American and European Cinema. McFarland, 2000.
