= Henri Falk =

French writer

- Born: 19 August 1881; Neuilly-sur-Seine, France
- Died: 6 March 1937 (aged 55); Paris, France
- Occupations: Screenwriter, Playwright
- Years active: 1928–1936 (film)

Henri Falk (1881–1937) was a French playwright and screenwriter. A number of his works were adapted into films. The 1925 Broadway musical Naughty Cinderella was adapted by Avery Hopwood from a play by Falk.

== Selected filmography ==
- Good and Naughty (1926)
- Paris-New York-Paris (1928)
- Rendezvous (1930)
- My Wife's Teacher (1930)
- Our Masters, the Servants (1930)
- Love Songs (1930)
- Le Bal (1931)
- A Caprice of Pompadour (1931)
- This Is the Night (1932)
- The Improvised Son (1932)
- Mannequins (1933)
- The Premature Father (1933)
- My Hat (1933)
- Primerose (1934)
- George and Georgette (1934)
- The Hortensia Sisters (1935)
- Adventure in Paris (1936)
- Royal Waltz (1936)

== Bibliography ==
- Dietz, Dan. The Complete Book of 1920s Broadway Musicals. Rowman & Littlefield, 2019.
- Goble, Alan. The Complete Index to Literary Sources in Film. Walter de Gruyter, 1999.
