= Anna Tariol-Baugé =

French singer and actress

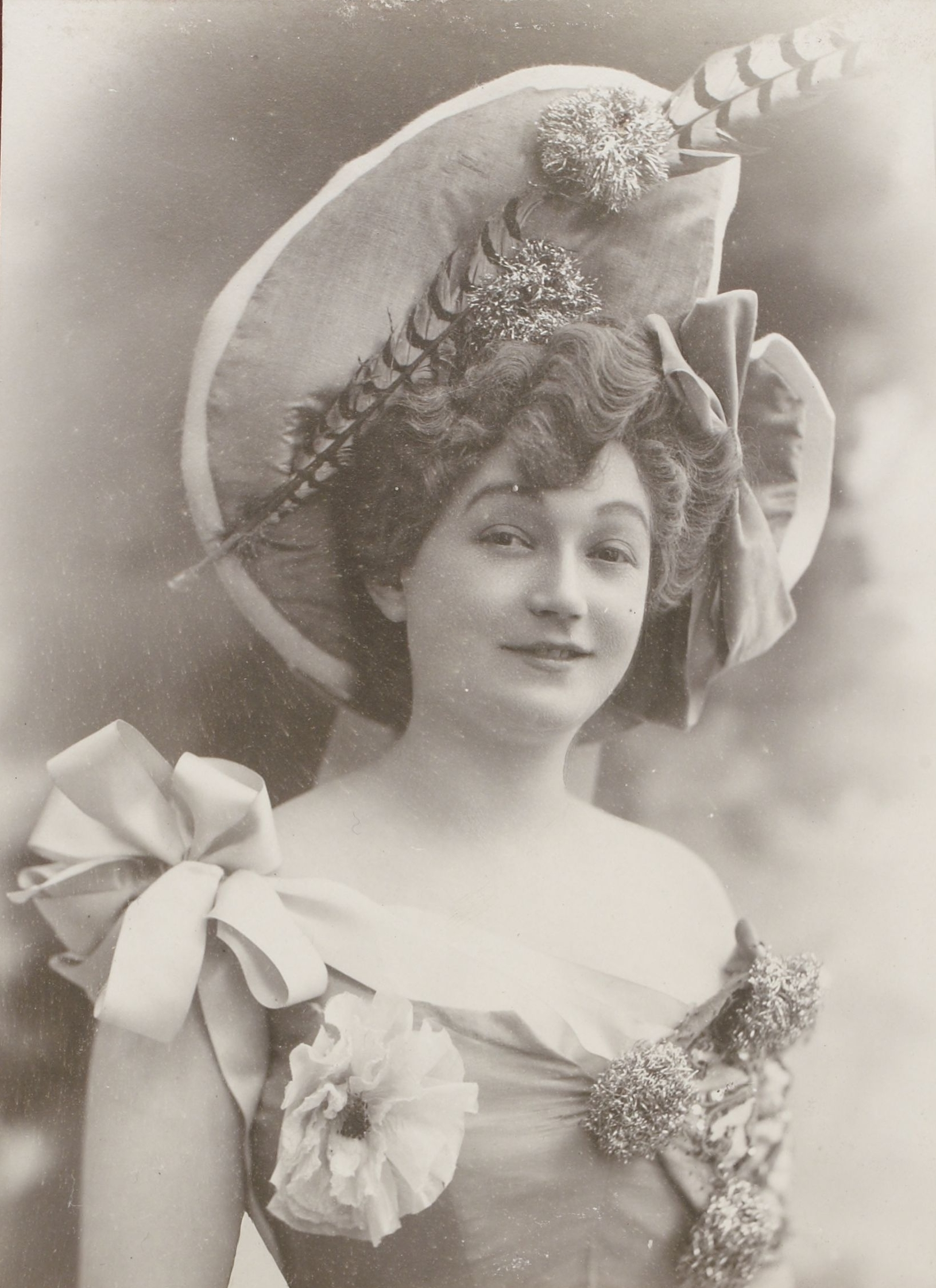

Background information
- Born: 28 August 1871; Veyre-Monton, France
- Died: 1 December 1944; Asnières-sur-Seine, France
- Genres: operetta
- Instrument: vocals

Anna Tariol-Baugé (born Anna-Rose Tariol; 28 August 1871, in Veyre-Monton – 1 December 1944, in Asnières-sur-Seine) was a French operetta singer and theatre actress. She is known for her performances in Offenbach's operettas.

== Life ==
Anna-Rose Tariol is the daughter of Joseph Tarriol, and Rose Grellier.

She made her debut at the Bordeaux opera, in the comic opera. In 1891, she moved to Russia. Returning to France, she sang in Toulouse and Nantes, then moved to Paris, where she performed mainly in light opera. She debuted at the Nouveau-Théâtre in a production of Boccaccio by Franz von Suppé.

Fernand Samuel, director of Théâtre des Bouffes-Parisiens, hired her. She performed in the roles of Loïa in the operetta La Dame de Trèfle (1898) by Maurice Froyez and Charles Clairville; Agathe Coquenard, at the premiere of Véronique, on 10 December 1898; La Chula in Shakespeare (1899); Aurora in Sleeping Beauty; Fanchon in François-les-Bas-Bleus (1900), and the title role of Josephine Sold by her Sisters.

In 1904, she was part of the troupe of the Théâtre des Variétés. She also appears on the stage of music-halls, at the Casino de Paris, at the Moulin-Rouge, and at the Théâtre Marigny.
