= Good and Naughty =

1926 film

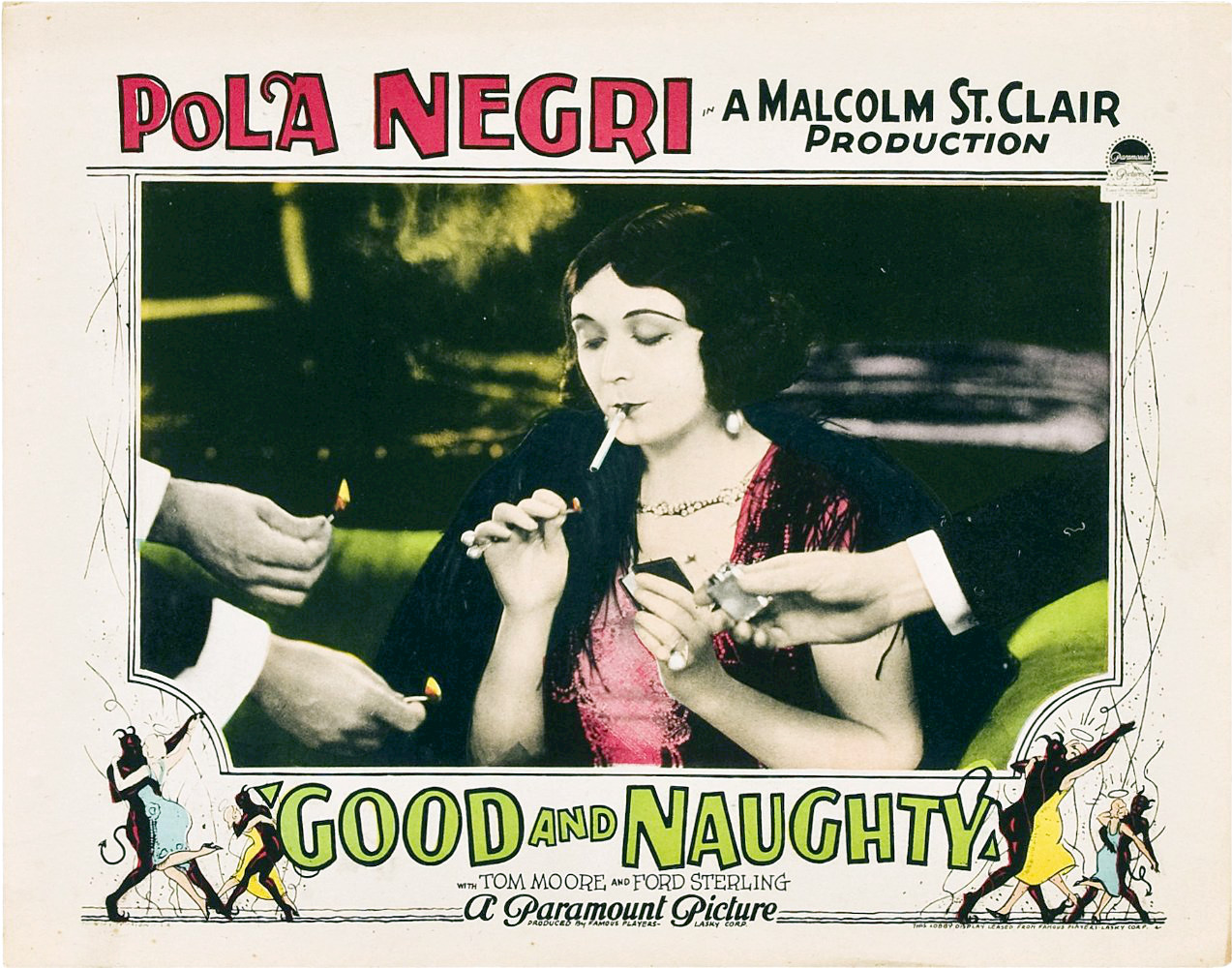
- Lobby card
- Directed by: Malcolm St. Clair
- Written by: Avery Hopwood; Pierre Collings
- Based on: Naughty Cinderella by Henri Falk and René Peter
- Starring: Pola Negri; Tom Moore
- Cinematography: Bert Glennon
- Distributed by: Paramount Pictures
- Release date: June 7, 1926
- Running time: 6 reels
- Country: United States
- Language: Silent (English intertitles)

Good and Naughty is a 1926 American silent romantic comedy film directed by Malcolm St. Clair and starring Pola Negri and Tom Moore. It was based on the play Naughty Cinderella by Henri Falk and René Peter. Released in 1926, it is a romantic comedy of mistaken identity about an attractive interior decorator (Negri) who is forced to make herself unattractive so she can be hired by a firm that has a policy against hiring attractive women.

== Plot ==
As described in a film magazine, because a firm has a policy against hiring attractive women because they soon marry other employees and then quit, Germaine Morris makes herself unattractive and is hired as an interior decorator. She is secretly in love with the firm's head, Gerald Gray, who has been courting Claire, the wife of one of his patrons, Thomas Fenton. Claire invites Gerald to accompany them on a yachting trip. To allay suspicions, Gerald's friend Bunny West arranges for chorus girl Chouchou Rouselle to come along with them as his pretend fiancé. When the latter is unable to go, Germaine tells Bunny that she will go instead of the chorus girl. Germaine boards as her regular self, a woman of amazing loveliness, and Gerald, Bunny, and the Fenton's all fall in love with her. After several situations, including Claire confessing to her husband that she was being courted by another man, Gerald arranges a reconciliation between the husband and wife and then proposes an arrangement between himself and Germaine so that she can become a former employee.

== Cast ==
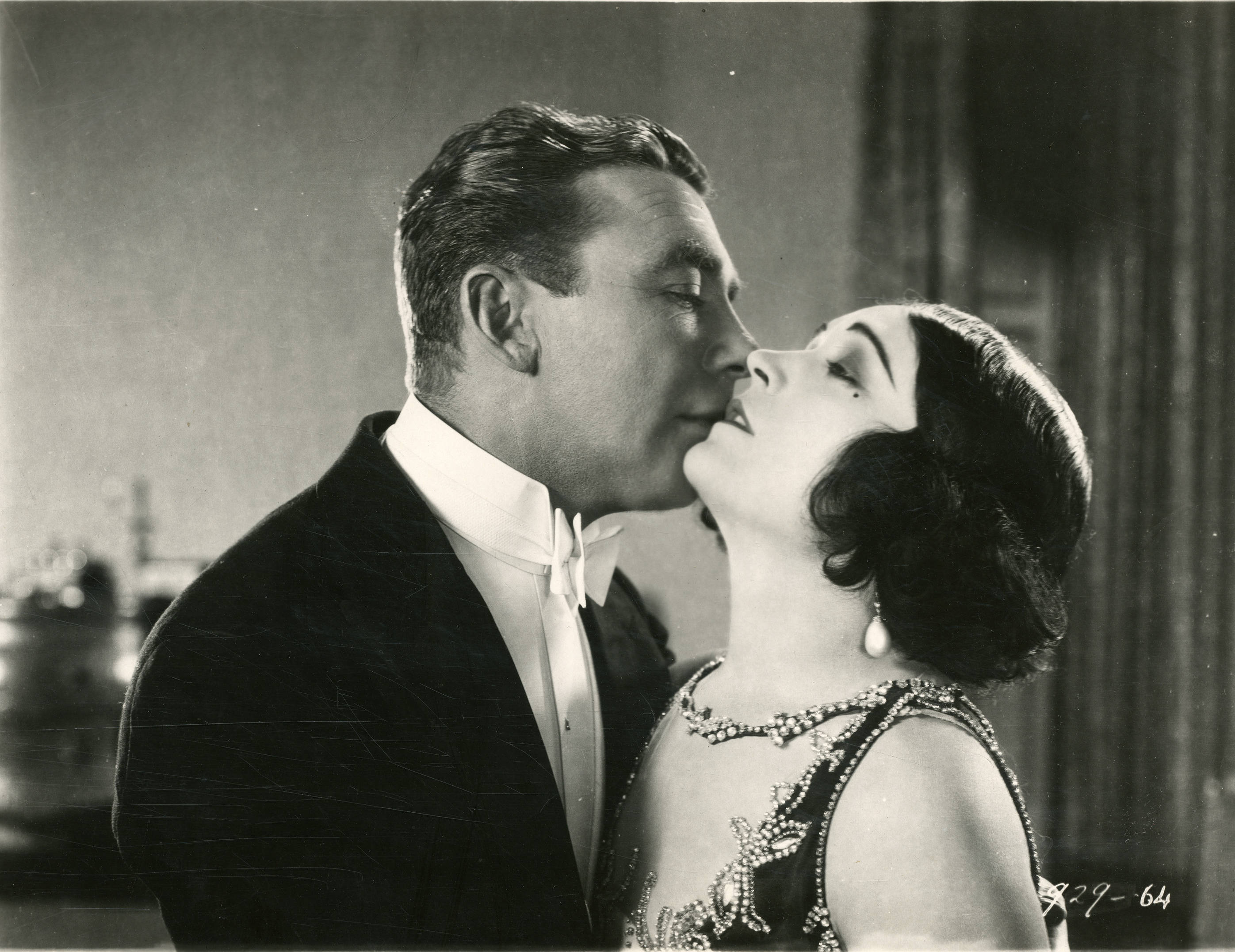
Tom Moore and Pola Negri in Good and Naughty

- Pola Negri as Germaine Morris
- Tom Moore as Gerald Gray
- Ford Sterling as Bunny West
- Miss DuPont as Claire Fenton
- Stuart Holmes as Thomas Fenton
- Marie Mosquini as Chouchou Rouselle
- Warner Richmond as Bad News Smith

== Reception ==
Good and Naughty earned a measured approval by New York Times film critic Mordaunt Hall, who deemed the film “an artificial but competently acted screen chronicle” and “an agreeable entertainment proving its worth by the periodical outbursts of laughter it elicited.” Hall added that though the film was appreciated by the theatre patrons “some of the humor is built on extraneous gags that do not help the continuity of the narrative, even though they had the desired effect upon the audience.”

== Preservation ==
With no prints of Good and Naughty located in any film archives, it is a lost film.
