= Face Value (1927 film) =

1927 film

- Directed by: Robert Florey
- Written by: Frances Guihan
- Starring: Fritzi Ridgeway; Gene Gowing; Betty Baker
- Cinematography: Herbert Kirkpatrick
- Production company: Sterling Pictures
- Release date: August 1, 1927
- Running time: 50 minutes
- Country: United States
- Languages: Silent; English intertitles

Face Value is a 1927 American silent drama film directed by Robert Florey and starring Fritzi Ridgeway, Gene Gowing and Betty Baker.

== Synopsis ==
After being badly wounded in the face during World War I, an American soldier remains in Paris after the war rather than return home to face his family and sweetheart.

== Cast ==
- Fritzi Ridgeway as Muriel Stanley
- Gene Gowing as Howard Crandall
- Betty Baker as Calra
- Paddy O'Flynn as Bert
- Jack Mower as Arthur Wells
- Edwards Davis as Crandall Sr
- Joe Bonner as Butler

== Bibliography ==
- Munden, Kenneth White. The American Film Institute Catalog of Motion Pictures Produced in the United States, Part 1. University of California Press, 1997.
