= Robert Florey =

French-born American director

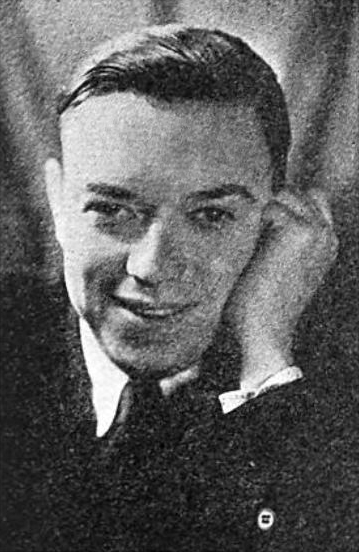
- Born: Robert Gustave Fuchs; September 14, 1900; Paris, France
- Died: May 16, 1979 (aged 78); Santa Monica, California, U.S.
- Burial place: Forest Lawn, Hollywood Hills Cemetery
- Occupations: Director; screenwriter; journalist

Robert Florey (September 14, 1900 – May 16, 1979) was a French-American director, screenwriter, film journalist and actor.

Florey directed more than 50 films, the majority of them during the 1930s, with the best known likely being the Marx Brothers first feature The Cocoanuts (1929). His 1932 foray into Universal-style horror, Murders in the Rue Morgue, is regarded by horror fans as highly reflective of German expressionism. In 2006, when his film Daughter of Shanghai (1937) was selected by the Library of Congress for preservation in the United States National Film Registry, he was noted as being "widely acclaimed as the best director working in major studio B-films".

== Early life ==
Born as Robert Gustave Fuchs in Paris, he grew up near the studio of Georges Méliès. In 1920, he worked at first as an assistant and extra in featurettes from Louis Feuillade.

== Career ==
=== Hollywood ===
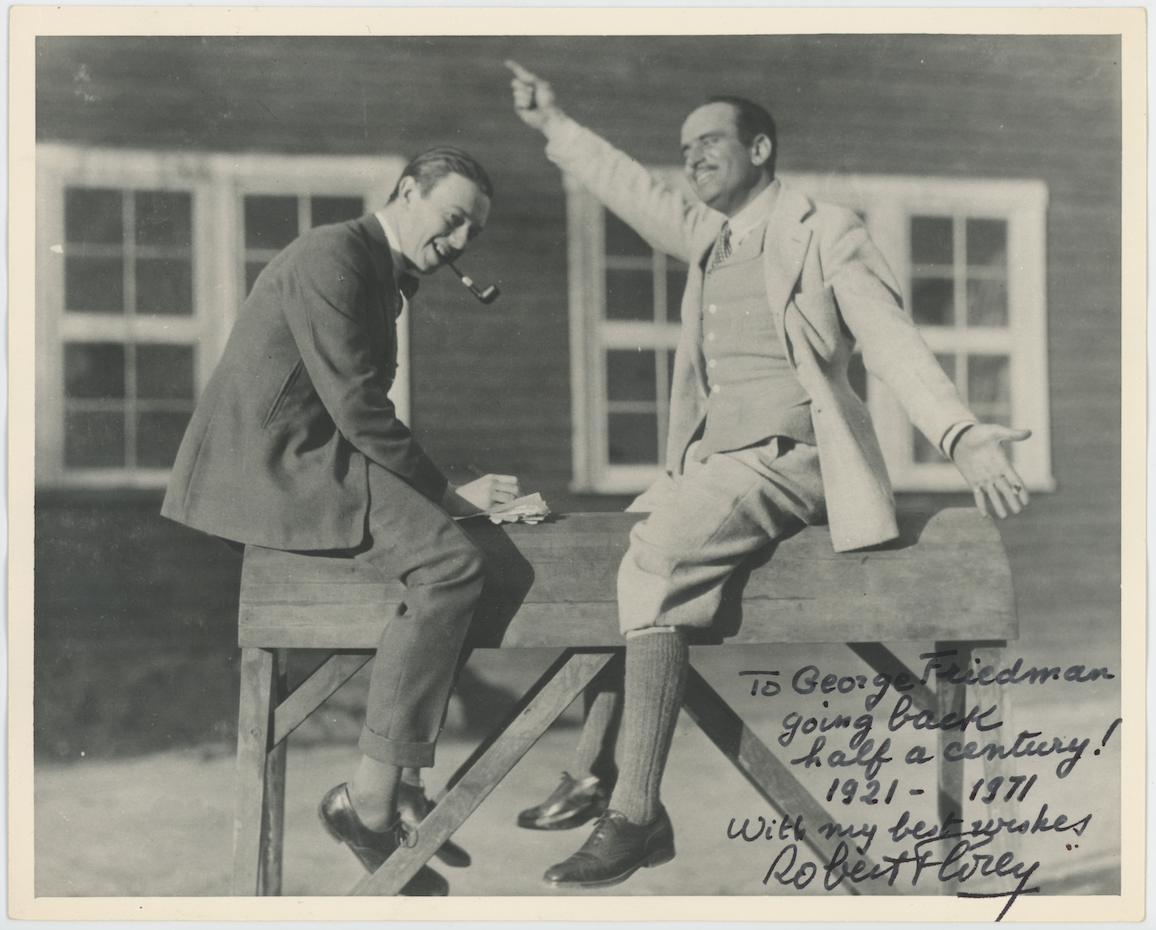
Florey and Fairbanks (1921)

In 1921, Florey went to Hollywood, working as a journalist for Cinémagazine. He was foreign publicity director for Douglas Fairbanks and Mary Pickford and European advance manager for Rudolph Valentino. He was an assistant director on Parisian Nights (1925). He was hired by Metro-Goldwyn-Mayer as an assistant on The Masked Bride (1925), Exquisite Sinner (1926), Bardelys the Magnificent (1926), La Bohème (1926) and The Magic Flame (1927). He also shot newsreel footage in New York.

=== Early films ===
Florey's first film as director was One Hour of Love (1927) for Tiffany Productions. He did The Romantic Age (1927) for Columbia and Face Value (1927) for Stirling Pictures. He was assistant on The Woman Disputed (1928). He directed and co-wrote the 27-minute experimental film Johann the Coffinmaker in 1927, said to have been made for $200 in his spare time, shooting at night while working on other films in the daytime. The avant-garde film was made on only three sets, and involved a lot of trick photographic effects.

=== Shorts ===
In the late 1920s he produced two experimental short films: The Life and Death of 9413: a Hollywood Extra (1928) co-directed with Slavko Vorkapić, and Skyscraper Symphony the following year. He also directed The Love of Zero (1928), Hello New York! (1928) with Maurice Chevalier, and Pusher-in-the-Face (1929) from a script and story by F. Scott Fitzgerald published for the first time on the magazine Woman's Home Companion.

=== Paramount ===
As a director, Florey's reputation is balanced between his avant-garde expressionist style, most evident in his early career, and his work as a fast, reliable studio-system director called on to finish troubled projects, such as 1939's Hotel Imperial.

At Paramount, he made The Hole in the Wall (1929), starring Claudette Colbert and Edward G. Robinson, and The Cocoanuts (1929), the first film of the Marx Brothers. He directed the short Night Club (1929) with Fanny Brice and made The Battle of Paris (1929) with Gertrude Lawrence.

Florey went to England to direct the French musical The Road Is Fine (1930), and to Germany for My Wife's Teacher (1930), a Spanish-language version of the film Rendezvous. While in Germany, he directed Love Songs (1930). He did Black and White (1931) with Raimu, co-directing with Marc Allegret.

=== Murders in the Rue Morgue ===
Florey made a significant but uncredited contribution to the script of the 1931 version of Frankenstein. Florey was to be given the job of directing Frankenstein, and he filmed a screen test with Bela Lugosi playing the monster, but Universal Pictures gave the job to James Whale, who cast Boris Karloff.

Instead, Universal assigned Florey and Lugosi to Murders in the Rue Morgue (1932). Florey, with the help of cinematographer Karl Freund and elaborate sets representing 19th century Paris, made Murders into an American version of German expressionist films such as Cabinet of Dr. Caligari (1920). Florey directed The Man Called Back (1932) with Conrad Nagel for Tiffany Pictures, and Those We Love (1932) with Mary Astor. He wrote the script for a version of A Study in Scarlet (1933).

=== Warner Bros. ===
Florey went to Warner Brothers, where he directed a number of "B" movies: Girl Missing (1933) with Glenda Farrell and Ben Lyon, Ex-Lady (1933) with Bette Davis, The House on 56th Street (1933) with Kay Francis, Bedside (1934) with Warren William, Registered Nurse (1934) with Bebe Daniels, Smarty (1934) with Joan Blondell and William, I Sell Anything (1934) with Pat O'Brien, I Am a Thief (1934) with Astor, The Woman in Red (1935) with Barbara Stanwyck, and The Florentine Dagger (1935) with Donald Woods. He did some uncredited work on Go into Your Dance (1935) with Al Jolson and Ruby Keeler, and he was the assistant director on I've Got Your Number (1934). He also did some location filming in China for Oil for the Lamps of China (1935). He directed Going Highbrow (1935) with Guy Kibbee, Don't Bet on Blondes (1935) with William (and a young Errol Flynn), and The Payoff (1935) with James Dunn.

=== Paramount ===
Florey returned to Paramount where he directed Ship Cafe (1935) with Carl Brisson, The Preview Murder Mystery (1936) with Reginald Denny, Till We Meet Again (1936) with Herbert Marshall, Hollywood Boulevard (1936) with John Halliday and a young Robert Cummings, Outcast (1937) with William, King of Gamblers (1937) with Claire Trevor and Lloyd Nolan, Mountain Music (1937) with Bob Burns and Martha Raye, This Way Please (1937) with Charles "Buddy" Rogers and Betty Grable, Daughter of Shanghai (1937) with Anna May Wong, Dangerous to Know (1938) with Wong, and King of Alcatraz (1938) with Gail Patrick and Nolan. He did some uncredited work on Rose of the Rancho (1936). His films were marked by fast pace, cynical tone, Dutch angles, and dramatic lighting.

Florey directed Hotel Imperial (1939) with Isa Miranda and Ray Milland, The Magnificent Fraud (1939) with Akim Tamiroff and Nolan, Death of a Champion (1939) with Lynne Overman, Parole Fixer (1940) from a book by J. Edgar Hoover, and Women Without Names (1940) with Ellen Drew.

=== Columbia ===
Florey went to Columbia for The Face Behind the Mask (1941) with Peter Lorre, Meet Boston Blackie (1941) with Chester Morris, and Two in a Taxi (1941) with Anita Louise.

=== Warner Bros. ===
Florey went to Warner Bros. for Dangerously They Live (1941) with John Garfield, Lady Gangster (1942) with Faye Emerson and the big budget musical The Desert Song (1943) with Dennis Morgan.

At 20th Century Fox he did some assisting on Bomber's Moon (1943) and directed Roger Touhy, Gangster (1944) with Preston Foster. He went to Republic for Man from Frisco (1944).

In April 1944, he was burned when his car was on fire. Back at Warners Florey directed God Is My Co-Pilot (1945) with Morgan, and Danger Signal (1945) with Emerson and Zachary Scott.

He did some uncredited work on San Antonio (1945) with Errol Flynn and returned to the horror genre with The Beast with Five Fingers (1946).

He was also associate director to Charlie Chaplin on Chaplin's film Monsieur Verdoux (1947).

=== Freelance director ===
Florey directed Tarzan and the Mermaids (1948) with Johnny Weissmuller for Sol Lesser in Mexico, and two French Foreign Legion films: Rogues' Regiment (1948) with Dick Powell and Outpost in Morocco (1949) with George Raft.

He did The Crooked Way (1949) with John Payne, The Vicious Years (1950), Johnny One-Eye (1950) with Pat O'Brien, and Charlie's Haunt (1950) with Edgar Bergen then did some uncredited work on Flynn's The Adventure of Captain Fabian (1951).

=== Television ===
Florey was a free spirit who valued his personal liberty within the studio system [but] he never had the commercial clout to make that system work for him...he amused himself with second-string projects and B-picture budgets, relatively minor efforts on which he could work undisturbed, casually inserted a personal touch here and there. His success at this mode of directing made him extremely suitable for television work, and he enlivened over 300 episodes of series like Wagon Train, The Twilight Zone and Alfred Hitchcock Presents with his characteristic stylistic flourishes.

— Film historian Richard Koszarski in Hollywood Directors, 1914-1940 (1976).

Florey's early works for television included The Walt Disney Christmas Show (1951) and Operation Wonderland (1951) for Disney.

He soon devoted himself to television almost exclusively, doing episodes of Your Favorite Story, The Loretta Young Show, Walt Disney's Wonderful World of Color, The Star and the Story, Four Star Playhouse, Ethel Barrymore Theater, Wire Service, Telephone Time, Studio 57, The Jane Wyman Show, General Electric Theater, Schlitz Playhouse, M Squad, Wagon Train, The Restless Gun (the pilot), Goodyear Theatre, Alcoa Theatre, Black Saddle, Westinghouse Desilu Playhouse, The Rough Riders, The David Niven Show, Lock Up, Zane Grey Theater, The Untouchables, The DuPont Show with June Allyson, Markham, The Texan, Checkmate, Michael Shayne, Hong Kong, The Barbara Stanwyck Show, Adventures in Paradise, Thriller, Alcoa Premiere, Alfred Hitchcock Presents, The Dick Powell Theatre, Going My Way, The Great Adventure, The Twilight Zone ("Perchance to Dream", "The Fever", "The Long Morrow") and The Outer Limits.

He also wrote a number of books, including Pola Negri (1927) and Charlie Chaplin (1927), Hollywood d'hier et d'aujord'hui (1948), La Lanterne magique (1966), and Hollywood annee zero (1972).

In 1950, Florey was made a knight in the French Légion d'honneur.

His 1937 thriller Daughter of Shanghai (1937) starring Anna May Wong was added to the National Film Registry in 2006.

== Personal life ==
Florey was married once from 1928 to 1936, and then a second time to Virginia Florey who lived until 2000.

== Death ==
Florey is buried at the Forest Lawn, Hollywood Hills Cemetery in Los Angeles with his second wife.

== Complete filmography ==
As an actor

- The Masque of Life (1915–1916)

This filmography lists Florey's credits as director of feature films, and is believed to be complete.

- That Model from Paris, 1926 (uncredited)
- One Hour of Love, 1927
- The Romantic Age, 1927
- Face Value, 1927
- The Hole in the Wall, 1929
- The Cocoanuts, 1929
- The Battle of Paris, 1929
- Skyscraper Symphony, 1929
- El amor solfeando (My Wife's Teacher), 1930
- The Road Is Fine (La Route est belle), 1930
- Love Songs (L'Amour chante), 1930
- Rendezvous, 1930
- Black and White (Le Blanc et la noir) (co-director), 1931
- Murders in the Rue Morgue, 1932
- The Man Called Back, 1932
- Those We Love, 1932
- Girl Missing, 1933
- Ex-Lady, 1933
- The House on 56th Street, 1933
- Bedside, 1934
- Registered Nurse, 1934
- Smarty, 1934
- I Sell Anything, 1934
- I Am a Thief, 1934
- The Woman in Red, 1935
- The Florentine Dagger, 1935
- Go Into Your Dance (uncredited), 1935
- Going Highbrow, 1935
- Don't Bet on Blondes, 1935
- Ship Cafe, 1935
- The Payoff, 1935
- The Preview Murder Mystery, 1936
- Till We Meet Again, 1936
- Hollywood Boulevard, 1936
- Outcast, 1937
- King of Gamblers, 1937
- Mountain Music, 1937
- This Way Please, 1937
- Daughter of Shanghai, 1937
- Dangerous to Know, 1938
- King of Alcatraz, 1938
- Disbarred, 1939
- Hotel Imperial, 1939
- The Magnificent Fraud, 1939
- Death of a Champion, 1939
- Parole Fixer, 1940
- Women Without Names, 1940
- The Face Behind the Mask, 1941
- Meet Boston Blackie, 1941
- Two in a Taxi, 1941
- Dangerously They Live, 1941
- Lady Gangster (billed as Florian Roberts), 1941
- Bomber's Moon (second-unit director), 1943
- The Desert Song, 1943
- Roger Touhy, Gangster, 1944
- Man from Frisco, 1944
- God Is My Co-Pilot, 1945
- Danger Signal, 1945
- San Antonio, 1945
- The Beast with Five Fingers, 1946
- Tarzan and the Mermaids, 1948
- Rogues' Regiment, 1948
- Outpost in Morocco, 1949
- The Crooked Way, 1949
- The Vicious Years, 1950
- Johnny One-Eye, 1950
- Adventures of Captain Fabian (uncredited), 1951

=== Short subjects ===
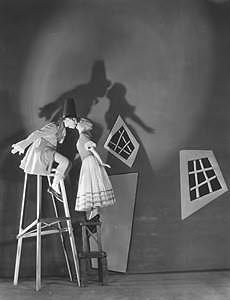
A publicity still from The Love of Zero, a 1927 avant-garde short film by Robert Florey

- The Love of Zero, 1928
- Hello New York! (aka Bonjour New York), 1928
- The Life and Death of 9413: a Hollywood Extra, 1928
- Skyscraper Symphony, 1929
- Fifty-Fifty, 1932
- "The Incredible Dr. Markesan" Thriller Series, costars Boris Karloff, 1962
