= List of French films of 1931 =

French films released in 1931

A list of films produced in France in 1931:

== A-L ==
Title	Director	Cast	Genre	Notes
À nous la liberté	René Clair	Henri Marchand, Raymond Cordy, Germaine Aussey	Comedy	Nominated for 1932 Oscar
About an Inquest	Henri Chomette, Robert Siodmak	Annabella, Jean Périer, Colette Darfeuil	Crime	Co-production with Germany
All That's Not Worth Love	Jacques Tourneur	Josseline Gaël, Mady Berry, Marcel Lévesque	Comedy drama	
Alone	Henri Diamant-Berger	Marie-Louise Damien, Henri Rollan, Ginette Maddie	Drama	
American Love	Claude Heymann, Pál Fejös	André Luguet, Suzet Maïs, Pauline Carton	Comedy	
Ariane	Paul Czinner	Gaby Morlay, Victor Francen, Rachel Devirys	Drama	Co-production with Germany
Azaïs	René Hervil	Max Dearly, Simone Rouvière, Gaston Dupray	Comedy	
Le Bal	Wilhelm Thiele	Germaine Dermoz, André Lefaur, Danielle Darrieux	Comedy	Co-production with Germany
Black and White	Marc Allégret, Robert Florey	Raimu, André Alerme, Fernandel	Comedy	
The Brothers Karamazov	Fedor Ozep	Fritz Kortner, Anna Sten, Aimé Clariond	Drama	
Calais-Dover	Anatole Litvak	Lilian Harvey, André Roanne, Armand Bernard	Comedy	Co-production with Germany
A Caprice of Pompadour	Willi Wolff	André Baugé, Gaston Dupray, Suzy Delair	Musical	
Caught in the Act	Hanns Schwarz, Georges Tréville	Blanche Montel, Henri Garat, Charles Dechamps	Comedy	Co-production with Germany
Checkmate	Roger Goupillières	Dolly Davis, Jean Marchat, Jean-Pierre Aumont	Mystery	
Comradeship	G.W. Pabst	Alex Bernard, Ernst Busch, Helena Manson	Drama	Co-production with Germany
Coquecigrole	André Berthomieu	Max Dearly, Danielle Darrieux, Gabrielle Fontan	Comedy drama	
Dance Hall	Maurice Tourneur	Gaby Morlay, Charles Vanel, José Noguero	Comedy	
David Golder	Julien Duvivier	Harry Baur, Paule Andral, Gaston Jacquet	Drama	
The Darling of Paris	Augusto Genina	Jane Marnac, Jean Gabin, Jean-Max	Drama	
Delphine	Roger Capellani	Henri Garat, Alice Cocéa, Jacques Louvigny	Comedy	
Departure	Maurice Tourneur	Jean Marchat, Simone Cerdan, Gaby Basset	Drama	
The Dream	Jacques de Baroncelli	Simone Genevois, Jaque Catelain, Jean Joffre	Drama	
Durand Versus Durand	Eugen Thiele, Léo Joannon	Roger Tréville, Paul Asselin, Jeanne Helbling	Comedy	Co-production with Germany
The Eaglet	Viktor Tourjansky	Jean Weber, Victor Francen, Simone Vaudry	Historical	
End of the World	Abel Gance	Abel Gance, Colette Darfeuil, Jeanne Brindeau	Science fiction	
English As It Is Spoken	Robert Boudrioz	Félicien Tramel, Wera Engels, Gustave Hamilton	Comedy	
La Femme d'une nuit	Marcel L'Herbier	Francesca Bertini, Jean Murat, Andrews Engelmann	Drama	
For an Evening	Jean Godard	Jean Gabin, Colette Darfeuil, Georges Melchior	Drama	
The Foreigner	Gaston Ravel	Fernand Fabre, Elvire Popesco, Henri Debain	Drama	
The Fortune	Jean Hémard	Alice Tissot, Claude Dauphin, Daniel Lecourtois	Drama	
The Girl and the Boy	Wilhelm Thiele, Roger Le Bon	Lilian Harvey, Henri Garat, Lucien Baroux	Comedy	Co-production with Germany
Gloria	Hans Behrendt, Yvan Noé	Brigitte Helm, André Luguet, Jean Gabin	Drama	Co-production with Germany
Holiday	Robert Boudrioz	Florelle, Lucien Gallas, Pierre Juvenet	Comedy	
I'll Be Alone After Midnight	Jacques de Baroncelli	Mireille Perrey, Pierre Bertin, Vanah Yami	Comedy	
La Chienne	Jean Renoir	Michel Simon, Janie Marèse, Georges Flamant	Drama	
Le Blanc et le Noir	Robert Florey	Fernandel, Raimu, Pauline Carton	Comedy drama	
Le Million	René Clair	Annabella, René Lefèvre, Jean-Louis Allibert	Musical	
Let's Get Married	Louis Mercanton	Alice Cocéa, Fernand Gravey, Marguerite Moreno	Comedy	
The Lovers of Midnight	Augusto Genina, Marc Allégret	Danièle Parola, Pierre Batcheff, Josseline Gaël	Crime drama	
Luck	René Guissart	Marie Bell, Marcel André, Françoise Rosay	Drama	

== M-Z ==
Title	Director	Cast	Genre	Notes
Make a Living	André Berthomieu	Victor Boucher, Dolly Davis, André Dubosc	Comedy	
The Malay Dagger	Roger Goupillières	Jean Marchat, Gaby Basset, Jean Toulout	Crime	
The Man at Midnight	Harry Lachman	Jean Weber, Josseline Gaël, Odette Talazac	Comedy	
Marius	Alexander Korda Marc Allégret	Raimu, Pierre Fresnay, Orane Demazis Charpin	Romantic drama	
Mistigri	Harry Lachman	Madeleine Renaud, Jean Debucourt, Noël-Noël	Drama	
Monsieur the Duke	Jean de Limur	Henri Defreyn, Alice Field, Stella Arbenina	Comedy	
Montmartre	Raymond Bernard	Gaby Morlay, Line Noro, Pauline Carton	Drama	
Moon Over Morocco	Julien Duvivier	Harry Baur, René Lefèvre, Robert Le Vigan	Mystery	
My Aunt from Honfleur	André Gillois	Florelle, Jim Gérald, Jeanne Cheirel	Comedy	
My Cousin from Warsaw	Carmine Gallone	Elvire Popesco, André Roanne, Madeleine Lambert	Comedy	Co-production with Germany
My Friend Victor	André Berthomieu	René Lefèvre, Simone Bourday, Pierre Brasseur	Comedy	
Passport 13.444	Léon Mathot	Léon Mathot, Tania Fédor, René Ferté	Adventure	
The Perfume of the Lady in Black	Marcel L'Herbier	Roland Toutain, Huguette Duflos, Wera Engels	Mystery	
On purge bébé	Jean Renoir	Michel Simon, Marguerite Pierry, Fernandel	Comedy	
Princess, At Your Orders!	Hanns Schwarz, Max de Vaucorbeil	Lilian Harvey, Henri Garat, Jean Mercanton	Comedy	Co-production with Germany
The Rebel	Adelqui Migliar	Suzy Vernon, Thomy Bourdelle, Pierre Batcheff	Drama	
Ronny	Reinhold Schünzel, Roger Le Bon	Käthe von Nagy, Lucien Baroux, Georges Deneubourg	Comedy	Co production with Germany
Salto Mortale	Ewald André Dupont	Gina Manès, Daniel Mendaille, Alfred Machard	Drama	Co-production with Germany
The Train of Suicides	Edmond T. Gréville	Vanda Gréville, Georges Colin, Simone Bourday	Thriller	
The Typist	Wilhelm Thiele	Marie Glory, Jean Murat, Armand Bernard	Comedy	
The Unknown Singer	Viktor Tourjansky	Lucien Muratore, Simone Cerdan, Jim Gérald	Drama	
The Voice of Happiness	Léo Joannon	Pauline Carton, René Ferté, Simone Bourday	Comedy	
When Love Is Over	Léonce Perret	Gaby Morlay, Victor Francen, Tania Fédor	Drama	
The Yellow House of Rio	Karl Grune, Robert Péguy	Charles Vanel, Renée Héribel, Jacques Maury	Thriller	Co-production with Germany

== Short films ==
Title	Director	Cast	Genre	Notes
Attaque nocturne	Marc Allégret	Fernandel, Julien Carette, Madeleine Guitty	Comedy	
Bouif's Daughter	René Bussy	Félicien Tramel	Comedy	
J'ai quelque chose à vous dire	Marc Allégret	Fernandel	Drama	short film

== See also ==
- 1931 in France
