= 1931 in Brazil =

Events in the year 1931 in Brazil.

== Incumbents ==
=== Federal government ===
- President: Getúlio Vargas (Head of the Provisional Government)
- Vice President: none

=== Governors ===
- Alagoas:
  - till 9 August: Hermilo de Freitas Blackbird
  - 9 August-31 October: Louis de France Albuquerque
  - from 31 October: Tasso de Oliveira Tinoco
- Amazonas: Álvaro Botelho Maia
- Bahia: Leopoldo Afrânio Bastos do Amaral, then Raimundo Rodrigues Barbosa, then Juracy Magalhães
- Ceará:
  - till 13 June: Manuel Fernandes Távora
  - 13 June - 22 September: João da Silva Leal
  - from 22 September: Roberto Carneiro de Mendonça
- Goiás: Pedro Ludovico Teixeira
- Maranhão:
  - till 9 January: José Maria Perdigão
  - 9 January - 18 August: Astolfo Serra
  - 18 August - 8 September: Joaquim Aquino Correia
  - from 8 September: Lourival Seroa da Mota
- Mato Grosso: Antonino Mena Gonçalves, then Artur Antunes Maciel
- Minas Gerais: Olegário Maciel
- Pará: Joaquim de Magalhães Barata
- Paraíba: Antenor de França Navarro
- Paraná:
  - Mário Alves Monteiro Tourinho
  - João Perneta
- Pernambuco: Carlos de Lima Cavalcanti
- Piauí:
  - till 29 January: Humberto de Areia Leão
  - 29 January - 21 May: Joaquim de Lemos Cunha
  - from 21 May: Landry Sales
- Rio Grande do Norte:
  - till 28 January: Irenaeus Jofili
  - 29 January - 31 July: Aluisio de Moura Andrade
  - from 31 July: Hercolino Cascardo
- Rio Grande do Sul: José Antônio Flores da Cunha
- Santa Catarina:
- São Paulo:
- Sergipe:

=== Vice governors ===
- Rio Grande do Norte:
- São Paulo:

== Events ==
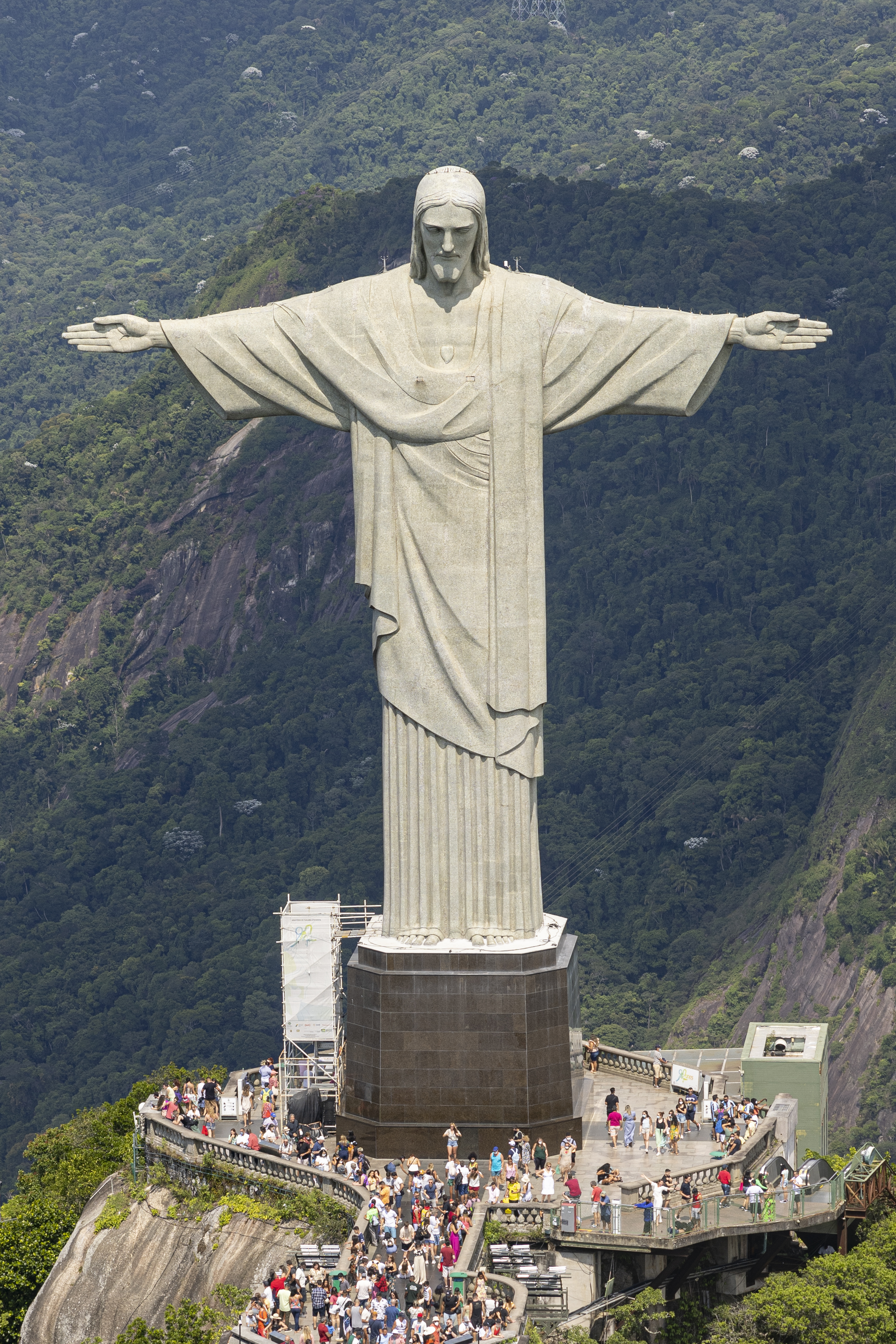
12 October: Statue of Christ the Redeemer

- 15 January – Eleven Italian seaplanes led by Italo Balbo land at Botafogo Bay after a 6,000 mile flight from Italy that began on 17 December. The pilots are greeted by President Getúlio Vargas.
- 16 September – Frente Negra Brasileira, Brazil's first Black political party, is founded.
- 12 October – The statue of Christ the Redeemer, overlooking Rio de Janeiro, is consecrated.
- date unknown
  - The Caiçaras Club is founded in Rio de Janeiro.

== Arts and culture ==
=== Books ===
- Jorge Amado – O País do Carnaval (The Country of Carnival)
- Júlio Afrânio Peixoto – História da literatura brasileira

=== Films ===
- Limite, directed by Mário Peixoto

=== Music ===
- Zequinha de Abreu's piece "Tico-Tico no Farelo" is renamed "Tico-Tico no Fubá"

== Births ==
- 8 January – Ozires Silva, entrepreneur, founder of Embraer
- 19 January –
  - Ottomar Pinto, politician, Governor of Roraima (2004–2007) (died 2007)
  - Ítalo Rossi, actor (died 2011)
- 10 February – Cauby Peixoto, singer (died 2016)
- 14 February – Newton de Sordi, footballer (died 2013)
- 16 March – Augusto Boal, theatre director, writer and politician (died 2009)
- 2 March – Ruth Rocha, writer
- 31 March – Ary Fernandes, playwright, actor, producer and filmmaker (died 2010)
- 12 April – Chico Anysio, actor (died 2012)
- 17 April – Benedito Ruy Barbosa, screenwriter (died 2026)
- 28 April – Nair Bello, actress and comedian (died 2007)
- 8 May – Etty Fraser, actress (died 2018)
- 10 June – João Gilberto, singer and guitarist (died 2019)
- 13 June – Moysés Baumstein, holographer and artist (died 1991)
- 18 June – Fernando Henrique Cardoso, 34th President of Brazil
- 29 June – Palmirinha Onofre, cook and television presenter (died 2023)
- 9 August – Mário Zagallo, footballer and manager (died 2024)
- 3 September – Paulo Maluf, politician
- 16 October – Mílton Alves da Silva, football player (died 1973)
- 17 October – José Alencar, politician (died 2011)

== Deaths ==
- 26 January – Graça Aranha, writer and diplomat (born 1868)
- 9 June – Henrique Oswald, pianist and composer (born 1852)
- 24 July – Nonô, footballer (born 1899)
- 8 September – Prince Luiz Gastão of Orléans-Braganza, descendant of the Brazilian Imperial Family (born 1911)
- 6 October – Oscar Cox, sportsman (born 1880)

== See also ==
- 1931 in Brazilian football
- List of Brazilian films of 1931
