= List of Brazilian films of 1931 =

A list of films produced in Brazil in 1931:

| Title | Director | Cast | Genre | Notes |
|---|---|---|---|---|
1931
| Alma do Brasil | Libero Luxardo | Libero Luxardo, Antônio Ribas, Otaviano de Souza | Drama | |
| Alvorada da Glória | Luiz de Barros, Victor del Picchia | Nélson de Oliveira, Nilo Fortes, Lygia Sarmento | Musical drama | |
| Casa de Caboclo | Augusto Campos | Arnaldo Conde, Carmem de Oliveira, Emílio Dumas | Drama | |
| Cousas Nossas | Wallace Downey | Alvarenga, Francisco Alves, Sebastião Arruda | Musical comedy | |
| Limite | Mario Peixoto | Olga Breno, Tatiana Rey, Raul Schnoor Drama | Drama | |
| Mágoa Sertaneja | Wallace Downey | Humberto Catalano, Batista Júnior | | |
| Mulher | Octavio Gabus Mendes | Carmem Violeta, Celso Montenegro, Ruth Gentil | Drama | |
| O Campeão de Futebol | Genésio Arruda | Genésio Arruda, Arthur Friedenreich | Drama | |
| O Mistério do Dominó Negro | Cléo de Verberena | Nélson de Oliveira, Cléo de Verberena, Emílio Dumas | Mystery | |

== See also ==
- 1931 in Brazil
