= 1931 in film =

The following is an overview of 1931 in film, including significant events, a list of films released and notable births and deaths.

== Events ==
- January 5: RKO acquires the producing and distribution arm of Pathé for $4.6 million.
- March 14: Alam Ara, the first Indian-made sound film, premieres at the Majestic Cinema in Bombay.
- June 20: Monogram Pictures releases its first film, Ships of Hate.
- July 7: Anti-competitive practices disclosed about certain distributors and producers in Canada.
- November 17: E. R. Tinker elected president of Fox Films replacing Harley L. Clarke.
- December 14: RKO refinancing plan approved.

== Academy Awards ==
The 4th Academy Awards were awarded to films completed and screened released between August 1, 1930, and July 31, 1931, by the Academy of Motion Picture Arts and Sciences.

Most Nominations: Cimarron (RKO Pictures) – 7

Major Awards

- Best Picture: Cimarron – RKO
- Best Director: Norman Taurog – Skippy
- Best Actor: Lionel Barrymore – A Free Soul
- Best Actress: Marie Dressler – Min and Bill

Most Awards: Cimarron – 3 (Best Picture; Best Adaptation and Best Art Direction)

Cimarron was the first Western to win Best Picture, and would remain the only one to do so for 59 years (until Dances with Wolves won in 1991). It received a then-record seven nominations, and was the first film to win more than two awards.

The 5th Academy Awards were conducted by the Academy of Motion Picture Arts and Sciences on November 18, 1932, at a ceremony held at The Ambassador Hotel in Los Angeles, California. The ceremony was hosted by Conrad Nagel. Films screened in Los Angeles between August 1, 1931, and July 31, 1932, were eligible to receive awards.

Most nominations: Arrowsmith (Samuel Goldwyn Productions) and The Champ (Metro-Goldwyn-Mayer) – 4

Major Awards

- Best Actor: Wallace Beery – The Champ and Fredric March – Dr. Jekyll and Mr. Hyde
- Best Actress: Helen Hayes – The Sin of Madelon Claudet
- Best Director: Frank Borzage – Bad Girl

Most Awards: Bad Girl (Best Director and Best Adaptation) and The Champ (Best Actor and Best Original Story) – 2

Note: The Academy Award for Best Picture went to 1932's Grand Hotel.

== Top-grossing films (U.S.) ==
The top ten 1931 released films by box office gross in North America are as follows:

Highest-grossing films of 1931
Rank	Title	Distributor	Domestic rentals
1	City Lights	United Artists	$2,000,000
2	Trader Horn	MGM	$1,642,000
3	Palmy Days	United Artists	$1,601,000
4	The Man Who Came Back	Fox Film	$1,400,000
5	Merely Mary Ann	Fox Film	$1,300,000
6	Arrowsmith; Dr. Jekyll and Mr. Hyde	United Artists; Paramount	$1,250,000
7	A Connecticut Yankee	Fox Film	$1,200,000
8	Cimarron	RKO	$1,122,000
9	Bad Girl	Fox Film	$1,100,000
10	Possessed	MGM	$1,030,000

== Best money stars ==
Variety reported the following as the biggest male stars in the U.S. in alphabetical order although grouped George Arliss and Ronald Colman together as having equal ranking.

Actor
George Arliss

Ronald Colman

Wallace Beery
Maurice Chevalier
Clark Gable
Edward G. Robinson
Will Rogers

The following were the biggest women names in the U.S. in alphabetical order but again grouped two actresses together to denote they were ranked the same.

Actress
Constance Bennett
Joan Crawford
Marlene Dietrich
Greta Garbo

Marie Dressler

Janet Gaynor
Norma Shearer

== Notable films ==
United States unless stated

=== # ===
- 24 Hours, directed by Marion Gering, starring Clive Brook, Kay Francis and Miriam Hopkins

=== A ===
- À Nous la Liberté (Freedom for Us), directed by René Clair – (France)
- Alam Ara (The Light of the World) (lost), directed by Ardeshir Irani – (India)
- Alexander Hamilton, directed by John G. Adolfi, starring George Arliss
- Alibi (lost), directed by Leslie S. Hiscott – (GB)
- Alice in Wonderland, directed by Bud Pollard
- Alone (Sola), directed by Henri Diamant-Berger – (France)
- Alone (Odna), directed by Leonid Trauberg and Grigori Kozintsev – (USSR)
- An American Tragedy, directed by Josef von Sternberg, starring Phillips Holmes and Sylvia Sidney
- Arrowsmith, directed by John Ford, starring Ronald Colman and Helen Hayes

=== B ===
- Bachelor Apartment, starring and directed by Lowell Sherman with Irene Dunne
- The Bachelor Father, directed by Robert Z. Leonard, starring Marion Davies and Ray Milland
- Bad Girl, directed by Frank Borzage, starring Sally Eilers and James Dunn
- Bad Sister, directed by Hobart Henley, starring Conrad Nagel, Sidney Fox, Bette Davis, Humphrey Bogart and ZaSu Pitts
- Berlin-Alexanderplatz, directed by Phil Jutzi, starring Heinrich George, based on the 1929 novel by Alfred Döblin – (Germany)
- The Black Camel, directed by Hamilton MacFadden, starring Warner Oland, Sally Eilers and Bela Lugosi
- Blonde Crazy, directed by Roy Del Ruth, starring James Cagney and Joan Blondell
- Bought!, directed by Archie Mayo, starring Constance Bennett
- Business Under Distress (To neznáte Hadimršku), Karel Lamač and Martin Frič – (Czechoslovakia)

=== C ===
- The Champ, directed by King Vidor, starring Wallace Beery and Jackie Cooper
- The Cheat, directed by George Abbott, starring Tallulah Bankhead
- La Chienne (The Bitch), directed by Jean Renoir, starring Michel Simon – (France)
- Cimarron, directed by Wesley Ruggles, starring Richard Dix and Irene Dunne
- The Cisco Kid, directed by Irving Cummings, starring Warner Baxter
- City Lights, a Charlie Chaplin film
- City Streets, directed by Rouben Mamoulian, starring Gary Cooper and Sylvia Sidney
- A Connecticut Yankee, directed by David Butler, starring Will Rogers
- The Criminal Code, directed by Howard Hawks, starring Walter Huston

=== D ===
- Daughter of the Dragon, directed by Lloyd Corrigan, starring Anna May Wong, Warner Oland and Sessue Hayakawa
- David Golder, directed by Julien Duvivier – (France)
- Dishonored, directed by Josef von Sternberg, starring Marlene Dietrich and Victor McLaglen
- Down River, directed by Peter Godfrey, starring Charles Laughton – (GB)
- Dr. Jekyll and Mr. Hyde, directed by Rouben Mamoulian, starring Fredric March and Miriam Hopkins
- Dracula, directed by Tod Browning, starring Bela Lugosi
- Dracula, directed by George Melford, starring Carlos Villarías

=== E ===
- Elisabeth of Austria (Elisabeth von Österreich), directed by Adolf Trotz, starring Lil Dagover and Paul Otto – (Germany)
- Emil and the Detectives (Emil und die Detektive), directed by Gerhard Lamprecht, starring Rolf Wenkhaus, Käthe Haack and Fritz Rasp – (Germany)
- Expensive Women, directed by Hobart Henley, starring Dolores Costello

=== F ===
- Five and Ten, directed by Robert Z. Leonard, starring Marion Davies and Leslie Howard
- Five Star Final, directed by Mervyn LeRoy, starring Edward G. Robinson
- Frankenstein, directed by James Whale, starring Colin Clive, Mae Clarke, John Boles and Boris Karloff
- A Free Soul, directed by Clarence Brown, starring Norma Shearer, Leslie Howard, Lionel Barrymore and Clark Gable
- From Saturday to Sunday (Ze soboty na neděli), directed by Gustav Machatý – (Czechoslovakia)
- The Front Page, directed by Lewis Milestone, starring Adolphe Menjou and Pat O'Brien

=== G ===
- Girls About Town, directed by George Cukor, starring Kay Francis, Joel McCrea and Lilyan Tashman
- Goldie, directed by Benjamin Stoloff, starring Jean Harlow and Spencer Tracy
- The Guardsman, directed by Sidney Franklin, starring Alfred Lunt and Lynn Fontanne
- Guilty Hands, directed by W. S. Van Dyke, starring Lionel Barrymore and Kay Francis

=== H ===
- Her Grace Commands (Ihre Hoheit befiehlt), directed by Hanns Schwarz, starring Willy Fritsch and Käthe von Nagy – (Germany)
- Hobson's Choice (lost), directed by Thomas Bentley – (GB)
- Honor Among Lovers, directed by Dorothy Arzner, starring Claudette Colbert and Fredric March
- The Hound of the Baskervilles, directed by Gareth Gundrey – (GB)
- Huckleberry Finn, directed by Norman Taurog, starring Jackie Coogan
- Hyppolit, the Butler (Hyppolit, a lakáj), directed by István Székely – (Hungary)

=== I ===
- I Take This Woman, directed by Marion Gering, starring Gary Cooper and Carole Lombard
- Indiscreet, directed by Leo McCarey, starring Gloria Swanson and Ben Lyon
- Iron Man, directed by Tod Browning, starring Lew Ayres and Jean Harlow
- It's a Wise Child, directed by Robert Z. Leonard, starring Marion Davies

=== J ===
- Just a Gigolo, directed by Jack Conway, starring William Haines

=== K ===
- Kalidas (lost), directed by H. M. Reddy – (Tamil)
- Kameradschaft (Comradeship), directed by G. W. Pabst – (Germany)
- Kiki, directed by Sam Taylor, starring Mary Pickford
- Der Kongreß tanzt (The Congress Dances), directed by Erik Charell, starring Lilian Harvey, Willy Fritsch, Conrad Veidt and Lil Dagover – (Germany)

=== L ===
- The Last Flight, directed by William Dieterle, starring Richard Barthelmess
- The Last Kiss, first full-length film produced in Dhallywood, Bangladesh
- Limite, directed by Mário Peixoto – (Brazil)
- Little Caesar, directed by Mervyn LeRoy, starring Edward G. Robinson, Douglas Fairbanks Jr. and Glenda Farrell

=== M ===
- M, directed by Fritz Lang, starring Peter Lorre – (Germany)
- The Mad Genius, directed by Michael Curtiz, starring John Barrymore
- Mädchen in Uniform, directed by Leontine Sagan, starring Hertha Thiele – (Germany)
- The Maltese Falcon, directed by Roy Del Ruth, starring Bebe Daniels, Ricardo Cortez and Una Merkel
- Marius, directed by Alexander Korda, starring Raimu and Pierre Fresnay – (France)
- Mata Hari, directed by George Fitzmaurice, starring Greta Garbo, Ramon Novarro, Lewis Stone and Lionel Barrymore
- Le Million, directed by René Clair – (France)
- The Millionaire, directed by John G. Adolfi, starring George Arliss
- The Miracle Woman, directed by Frank Capra, starring Barbara Stanwyck
- Monkey Business, directed by Norman Z. McLeod, starring the Marx Brothers
- My Sin, directed by George Abbott, starring Tallulah Bankhead and Fredric March

=== N ===
- The Neighbor's Wife and Mine (Madamu to nyōbō), directed by Heinosuke Gosho – (Japan)
- A Night in Montmartre, directed by Leslie S. Hiscott – (GB)
- Night Nurse, directed by William A. Wellman, starring Barbara Stanwyck, Ben Lyon, Joan Blondell and Clark Gable

=== O ===
- Other Men's Women, directed by William A. Wellman, starring Grant Withers, Regis Toomey and Mary Astor

=== P ===
- Palmy Days, directed by A. Edward Sutherland, starring Eddie Cantor
- Pardon Us, directed by James Parrott, starring Laurel and Hardy
- Parlor, Bedroom and Bath, directed by Edward Sedgwick, starring Buster Keaton
- The Peach Girl (Tao hua qi xue ji), directed by Bu Wancang, starring Ruan Lingyu – (China)
- Peludópolis (lost), directed by Quirino Cristiani – (Argentina)
- Platinum Blonde, directed by Frank Capra, starring Loretta Young, Robert Williams and Jean Harlow
- Possessed, directed by Clarence Brown, starring Joan Crawford and Clark Gable
- Private Lives, directed by Sidney Franklin, starring Norma Shearer and Robert Montgomery
- The Public Enemy, directed by William A. Wellman, starring James Cagney, Jean Harlow and Joan Blondell

=== Q ===
- Quick Millions, directed by Rowland Brown, starring Spencer Tracy

=== R ===
- A Brother's Revenge (Enteghm-e baradar), directed Ebrahim Moradi – (Iran)

=== S ===
- Sally in Our Alley, directed by Maurice Elvey, starring Gracie Fields – (GB)
- Secret Service, directed by J. Walter Ruben, starring Richard Dix
- The Secret Six, directed by George Hill, starring Wallace Beery, Lewis Stone, Johnny Mack Brown, Jean Harlow and Clark Gable
- Secrets of a Secretary, directed by George Abbott, starring Claudette Colbert and Herbert Marshall
- Sidewalks of New York, directed by Zion Myers and Jules White, starring Buster Keaton, Anita Page and Cliff Edwards
- The Sin of Madelon Claudet, directed by Edgar Selwyn, starring Helen Hayes
- The Sleeping Cardinal, directed by Leslie S. Hiscott, starring Arthur Wontner – (GB)
- Smart Money, directed by Alfred E. Green, starring Edward G. Robinson and James Cagney
- The Smiling Lieutenant, directed by Ernst Lubitsch, starring Maurice Chevalier, Claudette Colbert and Miriam Hopkins
- The Speckled Band, directed by Jack Raymond, starring Raymond Massey – (GB)
- A Spray of Plum Blossoms (Yī jiǎn méi), directed by Bu Wancang, starring Ruan Lingyu – (China)
- The Squaw Man, directed by Cecil B. DeMille, starring Warner Baxter and Lupe Vélez
- The Stolen Jools, directed by William C. McGann
- Street Scene, directed by King Vidor, starring Sylvia Sidney and Estelle Taylor
- The Struggle, directed by D.W. Griffith
- Svengali, directed by Archie Mayo, starring John Barrymore and Marian Marsh

=== T ===
- Tabu: A Story of the South Seas, directed by F. W. Murnau
- Tell England, directed by Anthony Asquith and Geoffrey Barkas – (GB)
- Ten Cents a Dance, directed by Lionel Barrymore, starring Barbara Stanwyck and Ricardo Cortez
- The Theft of the Mona Lisa (Der Raub der Mona Lisa), directed by Géza von Bolváry – (Germany)
- This Modern Age, directed by Nick Grinde, starring Joan Crawford and Neil Hamilton
- The Threepenny Opera (Die 3 Groschen-Oper), directed by G. W. Pabst, starring Lotte Lenya – (Germany)
- Tilly of Bloomsbury, directed by Jack Raymond, starring Sydney Howard and Phyllis Konstam – (GB)
- Tokyo Chorus (Tōkyō no kōrasu), directed by Yasujirō Ozu – (Japan)
- Tommi, directed by Yakov Protazanov – (USSR)
- Tonight or Never, directed by Mervyn LeRoy, starring Gloria Swanson and Melvyn Douglas

=== W ===
- Waterloo Bridge, directed by James Whale, starring Mae Clarke
- A Woman of Experience, directed by Harry Joe Brown, starring Helen Twelvetrees

== 1931 film releases ==
The Viking. 70 minutes. The Viking (French: Ceux du Viking), also known as White Thunder and Vikings of the Ice Field, is a 1931 Newfoundland/American adventure film about sealing directed by George Melford. Starring Charles Robert Starrett. The Viking was the first film to record sound and dialogue on location, with the use of magnetic wire recording. Release dates March 5, 1931 (Newfoundland) June 21, 1931 (United States)

=== January–March ===
- January 1931
  - 3 January
    - The Criminal Code
  - 9 January
    - Little Caesar
  - 17 January
    - Other Men's Women
  - 26 January
    - Cimarron
- February 1931
  - 3 February
    - Trader Horn
  - 14 February
    - Dracula
  - 28 February
    - Parlor, Bedroom and Bath
- March 1931
  - 5 March
    - The Speckled Band
  - 6 March
    - Ten Cents a Dance
  - 7 March
    - City Lights
  - 14 March
    - Kiki
  - 20 March
    - The Sleeping Cardinal
  - 21 March
    - Honor Among Lovers
  - 29 March
    - Bad Sister

=== April–June ===
- April 1931
  - 4 April
    - The Front Page
  - 6 April
    - A Connecticut Yankee
  - 15 April
    - Bachelor Apartment
  - 18 April
    - City Streets
    - The Secret Six
  - 23 April
    - The Public Enemy
  - 24 April
    - Dracula
  - 30 April
    - Iron Man
- May 1931
  - 1 May
    - The Millionaire
  - 11 May
    - M
  - 16 May
    - Indiscreet
  - 22 May
    - Svengali
- June 1931
  - 13 June
    - The Maltese Falcon
  - 20 June
    - A Free Soul
  - 21 June
    - The Black Camel
  - 27 June
    - I Take This Woman
  - 28 June
    - Goldie

=== July–September ===
- July 1931
  - 11 July
    - Smart Money
- August 1931
  - 1 August
    - The Smiling Lieutenant
    - Tabu
  - 7 August
    - Huckleberry Finn
    - The Miracle Woman
  - 8 August
    - Bought!
    - Night Nurse
  - 14 August
    - Bad Girl
  - 15 August
    - Pardon Us
  - 22 August
    - An American Tragedy
    - Guilty Hands
  - 29 August
    - The Last Flight
    - This Modern Age
- September 1931
  - 1 September
    - Waterloo Bridge
  - 5 September
    - Daughter of the Dragon
    - Secrets of a Secretary
    - The Squaw Man
    - Street Scene
  - 12 September
    - Alexander Hamilton
  - 18 September
    - Peludópolis (Argentina)
  - 19 September
    - Monkey Business
  - 23 September
    - Palmy Days
  - 26 September
    - Five Star Final
    - Sidewalks of New York
  - 30 September
    - Alice in Wonderland

=== October–December ===
- October 1931
  - 10 October
    - 24 Hours
  - 24 October
    - The Sin of Madelon Claudet
  - 31 October
    - Platinum Blonde
- November 1931
  - 1 November
    - The Cisco Kid
  - 7 November
    - The Mad Genius
  - 9 November
    - The Champ
  - 10 November
    - Secret Service
  - 21 November
    - Frankenstein
    - Possessed
  - 28 November
    - Battling with Buffalo Bill
- December 1931
  - 2 December
    - Anna Christie (Germany)
  - 3 December
    - Blonde Crazy
  - 7 December
    - Arrowsmith
  - 10 December
    - The Struggle
  - 12 December
    - Private Lives
  - 17 December
    - Tonight or Never
  - 24 December
    - Dr. Jekyll and Mr. Hyde
  - 26 December
    - Mata Hari

== Serials ==
- Battling with Buffalo Bill
- Danger Island
- Finger Prints
- The Galloping Ghost, starring Harold Grange
- Heroes of the Flames
- King of the Wild
- The Lightning Warrior, starring Rin Tin Tin
- The Mystery Trooper
- The Phantom of the West
- The Sign of the Wolf
- The Spell of the Circus
- The Vanishing Legion

== Short film series ==
- Laurel and Hardy (1921–1943)
- Charley Chase (1924–1940)
- Our Gang (1922–1944)
- Dogville Comedies (1929-1931)

== Animated short film series ==
- Aesop's Film Fables (1921–1933)
- Krazy Kat (1925–1940)
- Oswald the Lucky Rabbit (1927–1938)
- Mickey Mouse
  - The Birthday Party
  - Traffic Troubles
  - The Castaway
  - The Moose Hunt
  - The Delivery Boy
  - Mickey Steps Out
  - Blue Rhythm
  - Fishin' Around
  - The Barnyard Broadcast
  - The Beach Party
  - Mickey Cuts Up
  - Mickey's Orphans
- Silly Symphonies
  - Birds of a Feather
  - Mother Goose Melodies
  - The China Plate
  - The Busy Beavers
  - The Cat's Out
  - Egyptian Melodies
  - The Clock Store
  - The Spider and the Fly
  - The Fox Hunt
  - The Ugly Duckling
- Screen Songs (1929–1938)
- Talkartoons (1929–1932)
  - Mask a Raid (featuring Betty Boop)
- Looney Tunes (1930–1969)
- Flip the Frog (1930–1933)
- Terrytoons (1930–1964)
- Toby the Pup (1930-1931)
- Merrie Melodies (1931–1969)
- Scrappy (1931–1941)
- Tom and Jerry (Van Beuren) (1931–1933)

== Births ==
- January 1 – Mona Hammond, British actress (died 2022)
- January 3 – Conrad Brooks, née Biedrzycki, American actor and producer (died 2017)
- January 5 – Robert Duvall, American actor and filmmaker (died 2026)
- January 9 – Paul Mantee, American actor (died 2013)
- January 13
  - Scott Beach, American actor and writer (died 1996)
  - Charles Nelson Reilly, American comedian, actor, director and drama teacher (died 2007)
- January 14 – Caterina Valente, French singer and actress (died 2024)
- January 17 – James Earl Jones, American actor (died 2024)
- January 20 – Jack Grinnage, American actor
- January 22 – Mary Castle, American actress (died 1998)
- January 25 – Dean Jones, American actor (died 2015)
- January 26 – Mary Murphy, American actress (died 2011)
- January 29 – Leslie Bricusse, English-born film composer and lyricist (died 2021)
- January 30 – Read Morgan, American actor (died 2022)
- February 6
  - Bryan O'Byrne, American character actor and acting coach (died 2009)
  - Rip Torn, American actor and director (died 2019)
  - Mamie Van Doren, American actress and sex symbol
- February 8 – James Dean, American actor (died 1955)
- February 9 - Barbara Young, English actress (died 2023)
- February 14
  - Charles Hyatt, Jamaican actor, playwright and director (died 2007)
  - Margarita Lozano, Spanish actress (died 2022)
- February 15
  - Claire Bloom, English actress
  - Mohamed Hilmi, Algerian actor and director (died 2022)
- February 16 - Ken Takakura, Japanese actor (died 2014)
- February 18 - Laura Valenzuela, Spanish television presenter and actress (died 2023)
- February 20 - Karl Spiehs, Austrian producer (died 2022)
- February 24 – Dominic Chianese, American actor
- February 26 - Shay Duffin, Irish character actor (died 2010)
- February 28 - Gavin MacLeod, American actor (died 2021)
- March 5 - George Ogilvie, Australian director and actor (died 2020)
- March 8 - Gerald Potterton, British-Canadian director, writer, producer and animator (died 2022)
- March 15 - James Ellis, Irish actor (died 2014)
- March 20 – Hal Linden, American actor, director and musician
- March 22 – William Shatner, Canadian actor
- March 26 – Leonard Nimoy, American actor and director (died 2015)
- March 27 - Marion Brash, American actress (died 2022)
- April 1 – Ita Ever, Estonian actress (died 2023)
- April 7 - Ted Kotcheff, Canadian-Bulgarian director and producer (died 2025)
- April 8 – John Gavin, American actor and diplomat (died 2018)
- April 14 - Kenneth Cope, English actor and scriptwriter (died 2024)
- April 17 – Esteban Siller, Mexican voice actor (died 2013)
- May 5 - Brian O'Shaughnessy, British actor (died 2001)
- May 10 – Ettore Scola, Italian director and screenwriter (died 2016)
- May 13 - Zohra Lampert, American actress
- May 15 - K. S. Sethumadhavan, Indian director and screenwriter (died 2021)
- May 16 - Frank Albanese, American actor (died 2015)
- May 18 – Robert Morse, American actor and singer (died 2022)
- May 19 - James Greene, Northern Irish actor (died 2021)
- May 23
  - Barbara Barrie, American actress (died 2026)
  - Patience Cleveland, American actress (died 2004)
- May 24 – Michael Lonsdale, British-French actor (died 2020)
- May 28
  - Carroll Baker, American actress
  - Bob Hornery, Australian actor (died 2015)
- June 2 – Peter Cummins, Australian character actor (died 2024)
- June 3 – Carmen Dell'Orefice, American supermodel and actress
- June 7 – Virginia McKenna, English actress
- June 9 - Joe Santos, American actor (died 2016)
- June 14 – Marla Gibbs, American actress, singer, comedian, writer and producer
- June 15 – Ingrid van Bergen, German actress (died 2025)
- June 20
  - Olympia Dukakis, Greek-American actress (died 2021)
  - James Tolkan, American actor (died 2026)
- June 29 - Ed Gilbert, American actor (died 1999)
- July 1 – Leslie Caron, French actress and dancer
- July 2
  - Robert Ito, Canadian actor of Japanese ancestry
  - Frank Williams, English actor (died 2022)
- July 4 – Stephen Boyd, Irish actor (died 1977)
- July 5 – António de Macedo, Portuguese filmmaker, writer, university professor and lecturer (died 2017)
- July 6
  - Donal Donnelly, Irish actor (died 2010)
  - Della Reese, American jazz and gospel singer, actress and ordinated minister (died 2017)
- July 10 – Nick Adams, American actor and screenwriter (died 1968)
- July 11 – Tab Hunter, American actor and singer (died 2018)
- July 14 – Mirella Ricciardi, Kenyan photographer, writer and actress
- July 23 – David M. Walsh, American cinematographer.
- July 24 – Ermanno Olmi, Italian director and screenwriter (died 2018)
- July 27 – Jerry Van Dyke, American actor, musician and comedian (died 2018)
- July 28 – Darryl Hickman, American actor, voice artist, screenwriter and television executive (died 2024)
- August 1 - Pat Heywood, Scottish actress (died 2024)
- August 19
  - Elena Cotta, Italian actress
  - Marianne Koch, German actress
- August 23 – Barbara Eden, American actress
- August 12 – William Goldman, American screenwriter and novelist (died 2018)
- August 31 – Noble Willingham, American actor (died 2004)
- September 4 – Mitzi Gaynor, American actress, singer and dancer (died 2024)
- September 9
  - Zoltán Latinovits, Hungarian actor (died 1976)
  - Margaret Tyzack, English actress (died 2011)
- September 10 – Philip Baker Hall, American actor (died 2022)
- September 12
  - Ian Holm, English actor (died 2020)
  - Bill McKinney, American character actor (died 2011)
  - Silvia Pinal, Mexican actress (died 2024)
- September 13 – Barbara Bain, American actress
- September 17 – Anne Bancroft, American actress (died 2005)
- September 20
  - Peter Palmer, American actor (died 2021)
  - Ned Tanen, American producer (died 2009)
- September 21 – Larry Hagman, American actor and director (died 2012)
- September 29
  - Eddie Barth, American actor (died 2010)
  - Anita Ekberg, Swedish actress and sex symbol (died 2015)
- September 30 – Angie Dickinson, American actress
- October 6 - Eileen Derbyshire, British actress
- October 10 – Román Chalbaud, Venezuelan director (died 2023)
- October 12 - Yvonne Gilan, Scottish actress (died 2018)
- October 19 - Rubens de Falco, Brazilian actor (died 2008)
- October 21 – Vivian Pickles, English actress
- October 25 - Bob Gurr, American amusement ride designer and Imagineer
- October 30 - Ann Roth, American costume designer and actress
- November 3 – Monica Vitti, Italian actress (died 2022)
- November 5 - Gil Hill, American actor (died 2016)
- November 6 – Mike Nichols, German-born director (died 2014)
- November 10 – Don Henderson, English actor (died 1997)
- November 12 – Mary Louise Wilson, American actress, singer and comedian
- November 18 - Brad Sullivan, American character actor (died 2008)
- November 22 - Eric Rattray, British film producer
- November 30 – Jack Ging, American actor (died 2022)
- December 2 – Nadja Regin, Serbian actress (died 2019)
- December 3 - Jaye P. Morgan, American singer, actress and game show panellist (died 2026)
- December 9
  - Paddi Edwards, British-American actress (died 1999)
  - William Reynolds, American actor (died 2022)
- December 11
  - Anne Heywood, British actress (died 2023)
  - Rita Moreno, Puerto Rican actress
- December 20 - Mala Powers, American actress (died 2007)
- December 23 – Ronnie Schell, American actor and stand-up comedian (died 2026)
- December 24 - Robert Ridgely, American actor (died 1997)
- December 28 – Martin Milner. American actor (died 2015)

== Deaths ==
- February 18 - Louis Wolheim, American silent film/early sound film actor (born 1880)
- March 11 – F. W. Murnau, German director (born 1888)
- March 16 - James Neill, American silent film actor (born 1860)
- March 24
  - Charles Clary, silent film actor (born 1873)
  - Robert Edeson, stage and screen actor (born 1868)
- April 9 - Thomas Santschi, American screen actor (born 1880)
- June 7 – Viktor Schwanneke, German actor (born 1880)
- August 14 – Janie Marèse, French actress (born 1908)
- September 13 – Lawrence D'Orsay, English actor (born 1853)
- October 18 - Thomas Edison, inventor (born 1847)
- November 27 – Lya De Putti, Hungarian actress (born 1899)
- December 23 – Tyrone Power, Sr., stage and film veteran, father of movie star Tyrone Power (born 1869)

== Film debuts ==
- Hardie Albright – Young Sinners
- Elizabeth Allan – Alibi
- Astrid Allwyn – West of Broadway
- Heather Angel – City of Song
- Germaine Aussey – The Train of Suicides
- Binnie Barnes – A Night in Montmartre
- Ralph Bellamy – The Secret Six
- Gunnar Björnstrand – The False Millionaire
- Beulah Bondi – Street Scene
- Siegfried Breuer – Wochenend im Paradies
- Robert Burnier – Let's Get Married
- Bruce Cabot – Heroes of the Flames
- Joseph Calleia – My Sin
- Robert Coote – Sally in Our Alley
- Constance Cummings – The Criminal Code
- Finlay Currie – The Old Man
- Danielle Darrieux – Le Bal
- Bette Davis – Bad Sister
- Suzy Delair – A Caprice of Pompadour
- Alan Dinehart – The Brat
- Melvyn Douglas – Tonight or Never
- Paulette Dubost – Le Bal
- Else Ehser – M
- Hermione Gingold – Dance Pretty Lady
- Porter Hall – Secrets of a Secretary
- Yvonne Hébert – When Do You Commit Suicide?
- Rochelle Hudson – Laugh and Get Rich
- Allen Jenkins – The Girl Habit
- Gordon Jones – Not Exactly Gentlemen
- Arline Judge – Bachelor Apartment
- Guy Kibbee – Stolen Heaven
- Alexander Knox – The Ringer
- June Lang – Young Sinners
- Robert Le Vigan – Moon Over Morocco
- Wolfgang Liebeneiner – The Other Side
- Eric Linden – Are These Our Children?
- Ida Lupino – The Love Race
- Kenneth MacDonald – Dirigible
- Aline MacMahon – Five Star Final
- Amina Pirani Maggi – Television
- Orestis Makris – The Wizard of Athens
- Maritta Marke – Tired Theodore
- Matt McHugh – Street Scene
- Millard Mitchell – Secrets of a Secretary
- Pauline Moore – Frankenstein
- Adrian Morris – Dirigible
- Noël-Noël – La prison en folie
- Pat O'Brien – Honor Among Lovers
- Hugh O'Connell – The Smiling Lieutenant
- Eddie Parker – Delicious
- Otto Preminger (director, producer) – The Great Love
- John Qualen – Street Scene
- Gene Raymond – Personal Maid
- Kynaston Reeves – Many Waters
- Ethel Reschke – Mädchen in Uniform
- Flora Robson – A Gentleman of Paris
- Joe Sawyer – The Public Enemy
- Simone Simon – Durand contre Durand
- Jiřina Štěpničková – Muži v offsidu
- Betty Stockfeld – City of Song
- Doris Thalmer – Mädchen in Uniform
- Ann Todd – These Charming People
- Ralph Truman – City of Song
- Elena Verdugo – Cavalier of the West
- Virginia Weidler – Surrender
- Cora Witherspoon – Tarnished Lady
- Robert Young – The Black Camel
- Rina Zelyonaya – Road to Life
- George Zucco – Dreyfus

== Bibliography ==
- Block, Alex Ben; Wilson, Lucy Autrey (2010). George Lucas's blockbusting: a decade-by-decade survey of timeless movies, including untold secrets of their financial and cultural success. New York, New York: ItBooks.
- Finler, Joel Waldo (2003). The Hollywood Story. Wallflower Press. ISBN 978-1-903364-66-6.
