= Lucien Boyer =

French singer (1876-1942)

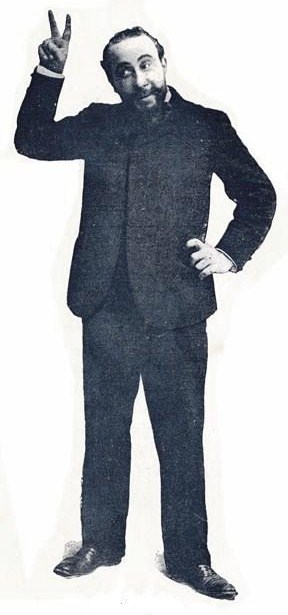
- Born: 20 January 1876; Léognan (Gironde)
- Died: 16 June 1942 (aged 66); Paris
- Occupations: Chansonnier, poet

Lucien Boyer (1876-1942) was a French music hall singer. He first won popularity singing to soldiers at the front during World War I.

Boyer's fame as a writer and singer spread throughout the world from the Montmartre district of Paris. He was author of more than 1,000 songs and 39 musical comedies and operettas. Among his best known songs were Valencia, Cu C'est Paris, La Femme du Matelot and Mon Paris.

When he came to America in 1921, it was for the purpose of acquiring American songs to be adapted for the public in France that liked "le Jazz."

Though Boyer did not author the famous French song La Madelon, he popularized the song during World War I.

== Published works ==
- Lucien Boyer Le Gondolier de Montmartre, collection of poetry, Paris, éditions du vieux moulin, 1926
- Lucien Boyer Paysages de France, Paris, société des publications modernes, 1931
- Lucien Boyer Qu'il était beau mon village, novel, Paris, éditions Baudinière, 1935
