= Edmond François Valentin About =

French writer (1828–1885)

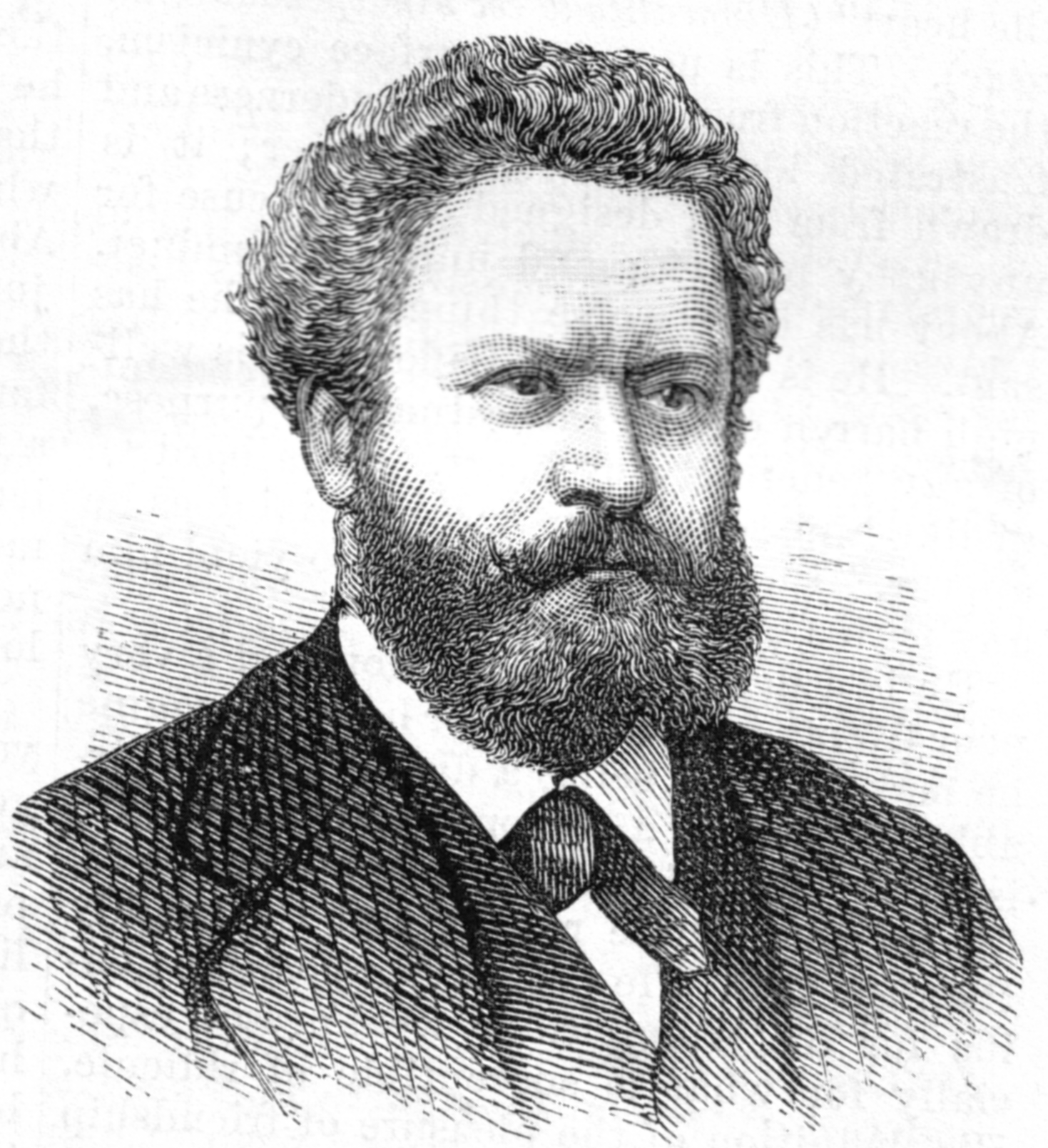
About in 1875.

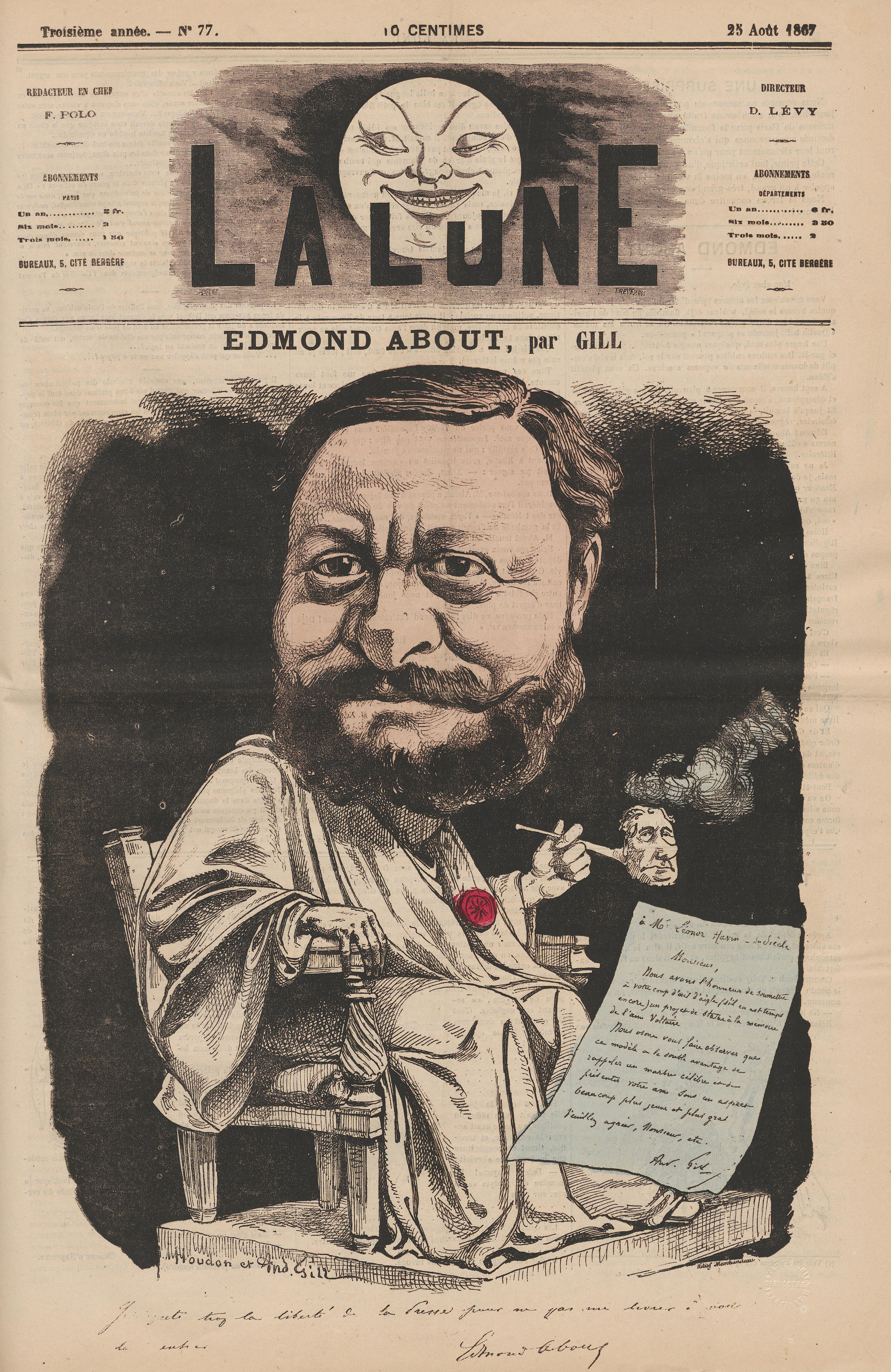
Caricature of About by André Gill, 1867.

Edmond François Valentin About (French: [ɛdmɔ̃ fʀɑ̃swa valɑ̃tɛ̃ abu]; 14 February 1828 – 16 January 1885) was a French novelist, publicist and journalist.

== Biography ==
About was born at Dieuze, in the Moselle département in the Lorraine region of France.

In 1848, he entered the École Normale, taking second place in the annual competition for admission in which Hippolyte Taine came first. Among his college contemporaries, besides Taine, were Francisque Sarcey, Challemel-Lacour and Prevost-Paradol. Of them all, About was considered the most highly vitalized, exuberant, brilliant and "undisciplined". It is said that one of his schoolmasters told him "You will never be more than a little Voltaire"

At the end of his college career, he joined the French school in Athens, but claimed that he had never intended to follow the professorial career for which the École Normale was a preparation, and in 1853 he returned to France and devoted himself to literature and journalism.

== Career ==
He made his name as an entertaining anti-clerical writer. The satirical Le Roi des montagnes (1856; translated into English by Mary Louise Booth as The King of the Mountains, and by Tom Taylor as The Brigand and His Banker, for a dramatized version) is the best-known of his novels.

In Greece, About had noticed that there was a curious understanding between the brigands and police: brigandage was becoming almost a safe and respectable industry. About pushed this idea to invent the story of a brigand chief who converts his business into a registered joint-stock company.

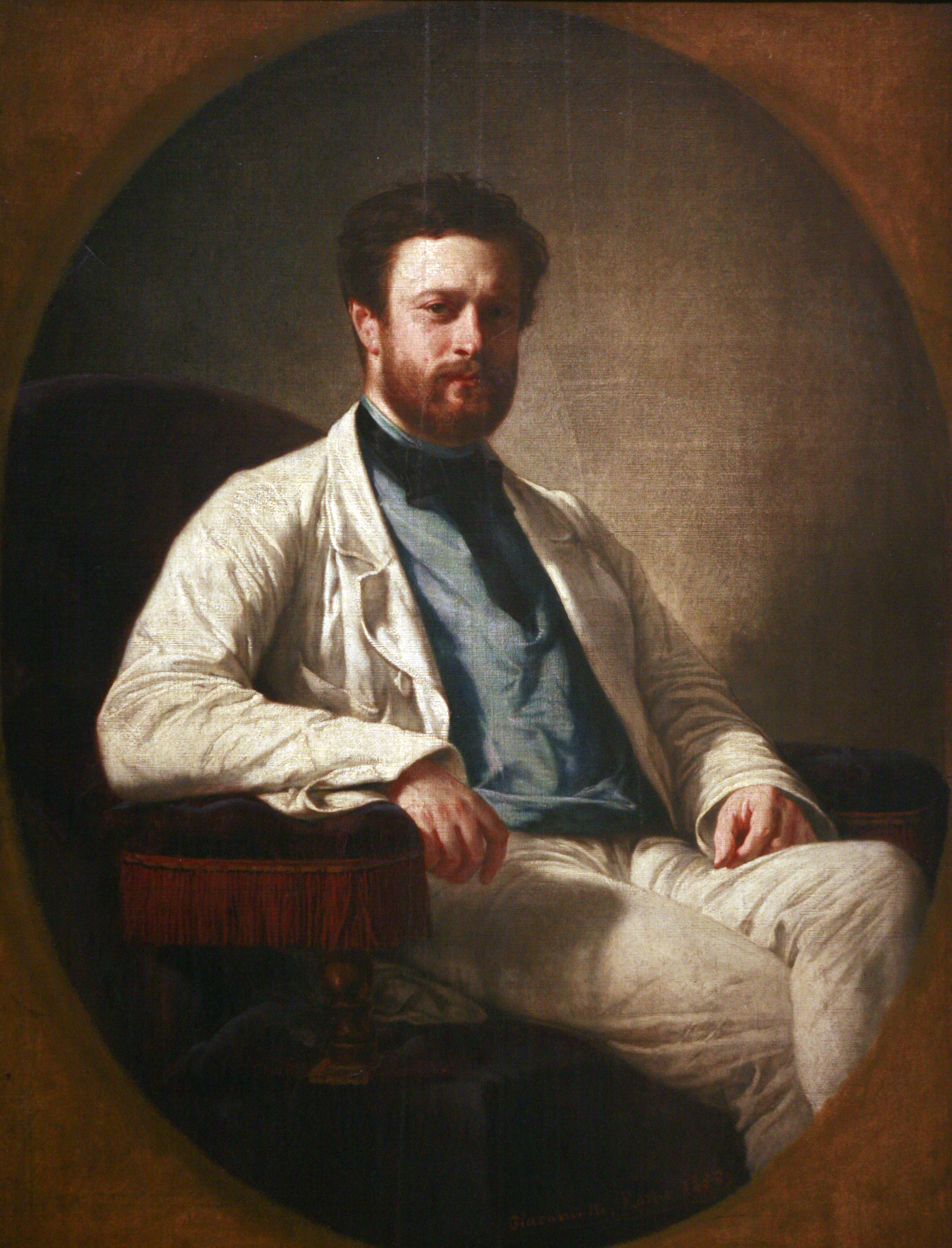
About at the time of his first notoriety, by Félix-Henri Giacomotti, 1858 (Musée des Beaux-Arts de Strasbourg)

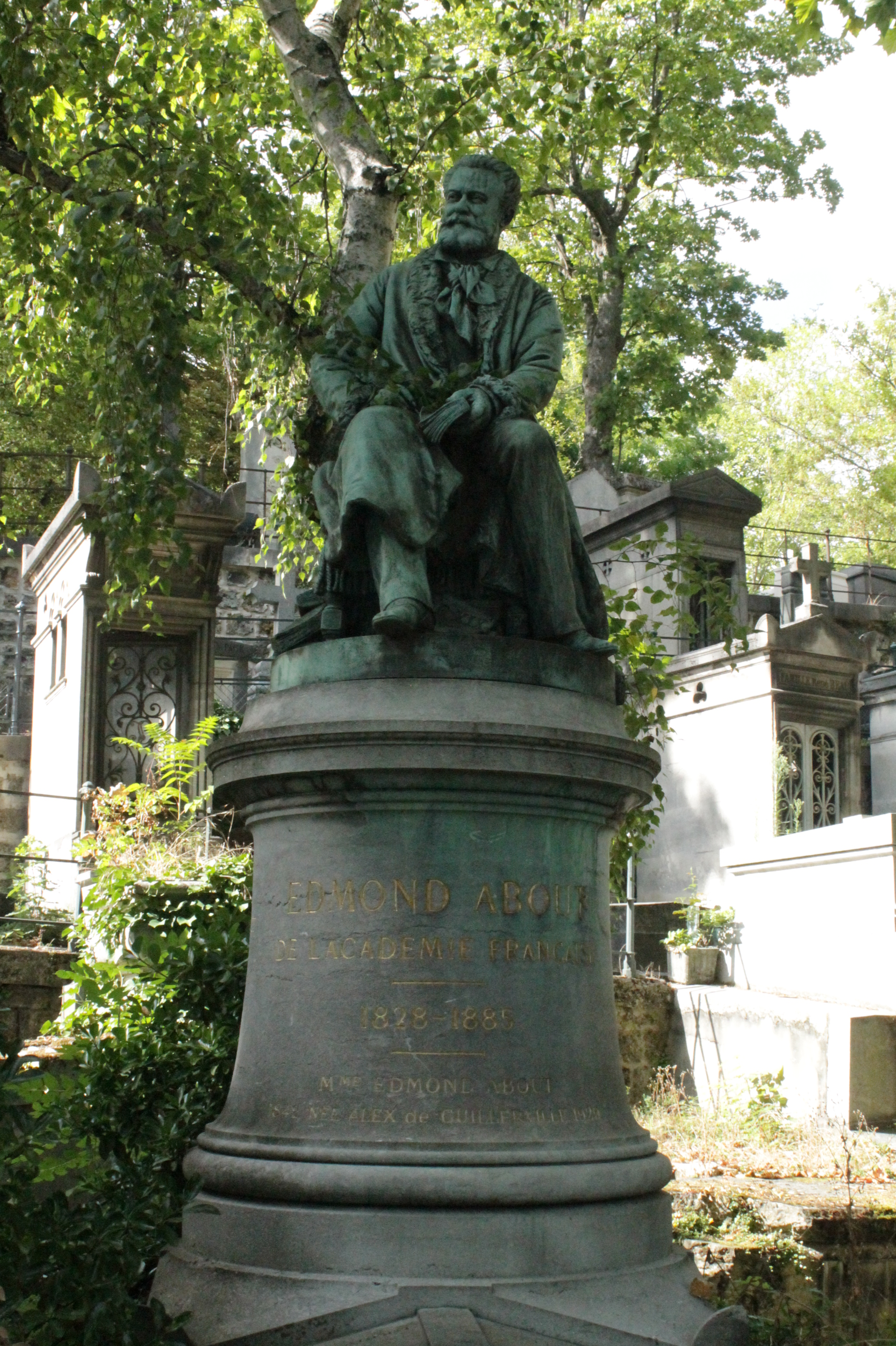
The grave of Edmond About in Pere La Chaise Cemetery in Paris

About's commentary on modern Greece, La Grèce contemporaine (1854), was an immediate success. But his Tolla (1855), the story of a young Parisian actress, gave rise to charges of drawing too freely on an earlier Italian novel, Vittoria Savelli (1841). This aroused prejudice against him, and he was the object of numerous attacks. The Lettres d'un bon jeune homme, written to the Figaro under the signature of "Valentin de Quevilly", provoked more animosities. During the next few years, he wrote novels, stories, a play (which failed), a book-pamphlet on the Roman question, many pamphlets on other subjects of the day, innumerable newspaper articles, some art criticisms, rejoinders to the attacks of his enemies, and popular manuals of political economy, L'A B C du travailleur (1868), Le progrès (1864). His more serious novels include Madelon (1863), L'Infâme (1867), the three that form the trilogy of the Vieille Roche (1866), and Le roman d'un brave homme (1880) – a kind of counterblast to the view of the French workman presented in Émile Zola's L'Assommoir. He is best remembered as a farceur, for the books Le nez d'un notaire (1862); Le roi des montagnes (1856); L'homme à l'oreille cassée (1862); Trente et quarante (1858); Le cas de M. Guérin (1862; see Georges Maurice de Guérin).

He was initiated at the Saint-Jean de Jérusalem Grand Orient de France lodge in Nancy on 7 March 1862. He wrote several articles against Masonic side degrees, a point of view that was common among French leftwing freemasons.

About's attitude towards the empire was friendly but critical. He greeted the liberal ministry of Émile Ollivier at the beginning of 1870 with delight, and welcomed the Franco-Prussian War. But as a result of the war he lost his beloved home in Alsace, which he had purchased in 1858 out of the fruits of his earlier literary successes. With the fall of the empire, he became a republican, and threw himself into battle against conservative reactionaries. From 1872 to about 1877, his paper, the XIX^{e} Siècle (19th century), became a power in the land. His political career, however, failed to advance further.

On 23 January 1884, he was elected a member of the Académie française, but died at age 56 before taking his seat. His grave at the Père Lachaise Cemetery in Paris includes a sculpture by Gustave Crauck.

== Literary influence ==
About's 1857 novel Germaine would suggest the basic premise of Henry James's 1902 novel, Wings of the Dove.

== Filmography ==
- L'uomo dall'orecchio mozzato, directed by Ubaldo Maria Del Colle (Italy, 1916, based on the novel L'Homme à l'oreille cassée)
- Per un figlio, directed by Mario Bonnard (Italy, 1920, based on the novel Germaine)
- Germaine, directed by Augusto Genina and Augusto Camerini (Italy, 1923, based on the novel Germaine)
- The Prince's Child, directed by Luise Fleck and Jacob Fleck (Germany, 1927, loosely based on the novel Le Roi des montagnes)
- The Man with a Broken Ear, directed by Robert Boudrioz (1934, based on the novel L'Homme à l'oreille cassée)
- Mi vida en tus manos, directed by Antonio de Obregón (Spain, 1943, based on the short story Le Buste)
- Trente et Quarante, directed by Gilles Grangier (1945, based on the novel Trente et Quarante)
- Le Roi des montagnes, directed by Willy Rozier (1964, based on the novel Le Roi des montagnes)
