= The Rosary (1934 film) =

1934 film

- Directed by: Tony Lekain; Gaston Ravel
- Written by: Gaston Ravel
- Based on: The Rosary by Florence L. Barclay
- Starring: Louisa de Mornand; André Luguet; Hélène Robert
- Cinematography: Jean Bachelet
- Music by: Franck Riss
- Production company: Florcal-Films
- Release date: 26 October 1934
- Running time: 95 minutes
- Country: France
- Language: French

The Rosary (French: Le rosaire) is a 1934 French drama film directed by Tony Lekain and Gaston Ravel and starring Louisa de Mornand, André Luguet and Hélène Robert. It is based on the 1909 novel The Rosary by British writer Florence L. Barclay and its stage adaptation by Alexandre Bisson.

== Cast ==
- Louisa de Mornand as Jeanne de Champel
- André Luguet as Gérard Delaval
- Hélène Robert as Pauline Lister
- Charlotte Lysès as La duchesse de Miremont
- Camille Bert as Docteur Grand
- Pierre Juvenet as Firmin
- Jean Rousselière as Bob de Lanzac
- Georges Flateau as Docteur Maréchal

== Bibliography ==
- Bessy, Maurice & Chirat, Raymond. Histoire du cinéma français: 1929-1934. Pygmalion, 1988.
- Crisp, Colin. Genre, Myth and Convention in the French Cinema, 1929-1939. Indiana University Press, 2002.
- Goble, Alan. The Complete Index to Literary Sources in Film. Walter de Gruyter, 1999.
- Rège, Philippe. Encyclopedia of French Film Directors, Volume 1. Scarecrow Press, 2009.
