= The Man with a Broken Ear =

1935 film

- Directed by: Robert Boudrioz
- Written by: Robert Boudrioz
- Based on: The Man with a Broken Ear by Edmond About
- Produced by: Albert Pinkevitch
- Starring: Thomy Bourdelle; Alice Tissot; Jacqueline Daix
- Cinematography: Léonce-Henri Burel
- Edited by: Andrée Danis
- Music by: André Cadou
- Production company: Réalisation d'art cinématographique
- Release date: 29 March 1935
- Running time: 75 minutes
- Country: France
- Language: French

The Man with a Broken Ear (French: L'homme à l'oreille cassée) is a 1935 French drama film directed by Robert Boudrioz and starring Thomy Bourdelle, Jacqueline Daix and Alice Tissot. It was an adaptation of the 1862 novel by Edmond About. The film's sets were designed by the art director Maurice Cloche.

== Cast ==
- Thomy Bourdelle as Le Colonel Fougas
- Jacqueline Daix as Clémentine
- Alice Tissot as Mademoiselle Sambucco
- Jim Gérald as Le capitaine des pompiers
- Gustave Hamilton as Le docteur Renaud
- Christiane Arnold as Madame Renaud
- Boris de Fast as Garok
- Jacques Tarride as Léon Renaud

== Bibliography ==
- Goble, Alan. The Complete Index to Literary Sources in Film. Walter de Gruyter, 1999.
