= Adrien Lamy =

French singer and actor

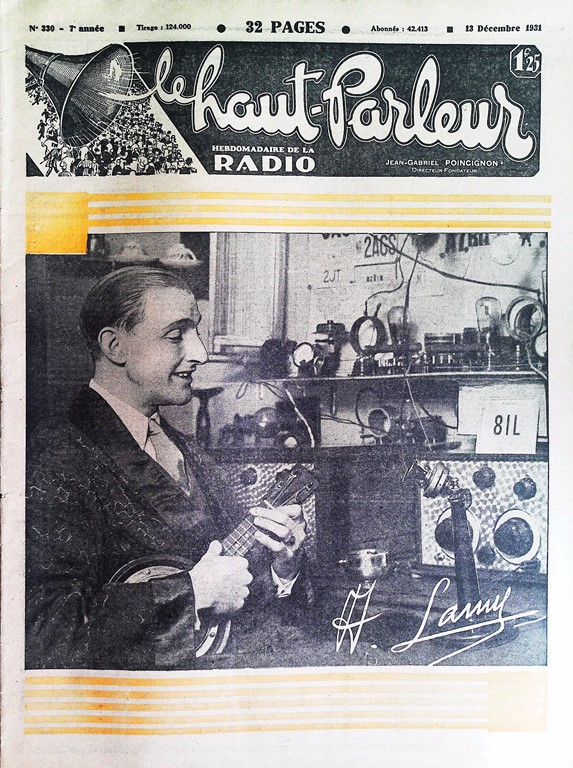
- Adrien Lamy in 1931.
- Born: 17 May 1896; Paris, France
- Died: 2 July 1940 (aged 44); Orleans, France
- Other name: Maurice Édouard Castarède
- Occupations: Actor, singer
- Years active: 1930–1938 (film)

Adrien Lamy (1896–1940) was a French actor and singer of theatre, film and radio. He made his name appearing in revues and operettas on the Paris stage. Following the introduction of sound film he appeared in a mixture of short films and features. He was killed from injuries sustained when Orleans was bombed by the Germans during the Battle of France.

== Selected filmography ==
- Chiqué (1930)
- Checkmate (1931)
- Le roi du cirage (1931)
- The Hortensia Sisters (1935)
- Prince of the Six Days (1936)
- Aloha, le chant des îles (1937)
- Madelon's Daughter (1937)
- The Little Thing (1938)

== Bibliography ==
- Brown, Tom. Spectacle in Classical Cinemas: Musicality and Historicity in the 1930s. Routledge, 2015.
- Pollack, Howard. George Gershwin: His Life and Work. University of California Press, 2007.
