= Madelon's Daughter =

1937 film

- Directed by: Georges Pallu
- Written by: Étienne Arnaud; Francis Didelot; André Heuzé
- Produced by: Maurice de Roock; Jean Mugeli
- Starring: Henri Garat; Hélène Robert; Ninon Vallin
- Cinematography: Hugo S. Delattre
- Music by: Jane Bos; Louis Bousquet; Marius-François Gaillard
- Production company: Films de Koster
- Distributed by: Pathé Consortium Cinéma
- Release date: 13 October 1937
- Running time: 88 minutes
- Country: France
- Language: French

Madelon's Daughter (French: La fille de la Madelon) is a 1937 French comedy drama film directed by Georges Pallu and starring Henri Garat, Hélène Robert and Ninon Vallin. The film's sets were designed by the art director René Renoux. The title refers to the popular First World War song La Madelon.

== Synopsis ==
The widow of a soldier from the First World War runs an inn frequented by veterans of the conflict. She is pleased to see her daughter fall in love with the son of a man who had once been in love with her during the war.

== Cast ==
- Henri Garat as René
- Hélène Robert as Mado
- Ninon Vallin as La Madelon
- Raymond Aimos as Mochu
- Jeanne Helbling as Monique
- Pauline Carton as La marquise de Sérignan
- Jean Dax as Le général de Cassagnes
- Robert Goupil as Le vicomte de la Goupillère
- André Marchal as Jef
- Mady Berry
- Camille Bert
- Claire Gérard
- Gustave Hamilton
- Adrien Lamy
- Olga Lord
- Georges Prieur
- Jean Sinoël

== Bibliography ==
- Bessy, Maurice & Chirat, Raymond. Histoire du cinéma français: encyclopédie des films, Volume 2. Pygmalion, 1986.
- Crisp, Colin. Genre, Myth and Convention in the French Cinema, 1929-1939. Indiana University Press, 2002.
- Rège, Philippe. Encyclopedia of French Film Directors, Volume 1. Scarecrow Press, 2009.
