= The Great Jasper =

1933 film

- Theatrical release poster
- Directed by: J. Walter Ruben
- Written by: H.W. Hanemann; Samuel Ornitz
- Based on: The Great Jasper by Fulton Oursler
- Produced by: David O. Selznick
- Starring: Richard Dix; Edna May Oliver; Florence Eldridge; Wera Engels; Walter Walker
- Cinematography: Leo Tover
- Edited by: George Hively
- Music by: Max Steiner
- Production company: RKO Pictures
- Distributed by: RKO Pictures
- Release date: February 17, 1933
- Running time: 85 minutes
- Country: United States
- Language: English

The Great Jasper is a 1933 American pre-Code drama film directed by J. Walter Ruben and written by H.W. Hanemann and Samuel Ornitz. The film stars Richard Dix, Edna May Oliver, Florence Eldridge, Wera Engels and Walter Walker. The film was released on February 17, 1933, by RKO Pictures.

== Plot ==
The film opens in the early days of the 20th century, when Jasper Horn is introduced as a lively Irish driver of a New York City horse-drawn street car. Although he is married and has a baby son, he has an affair with his boss's wife. Ten years later, the boss discovers the true father of the boy he thought was his son, and fires Jasper. Jasper leaves his wife and child and becomes a boardwalk fortune-teller in Atlantic City, calling himself The Great Jasper. Another 15 years pass and it is revealed that one of Jasper's sons has become similar in behavior to Jasper.

== Cast ==
- Richard Dix as Jasper Horn
- Edna May Oliver as Madame Talma
- Florence Eldridge as Jenny Horn
- Wera Engels as Norma McGowd
- Walter Walker as Daniel McGowd
- David Durand as Andrew Horn
- Bruce Cabot as Roger McGowd
- Betty Furness as Sylvia Bradfield
- James Bush as Andrew Horn
