= Sweepstake Annie =

1935 film directed by William Nigh

- Directed by: William Nigh
- Written by: Scott Darling
- Story by: Evelyn Law
- Produced by: M.H. Hoffman
- Starring: Tom Brown; Marian Nixon; Wera Engels
- Cinematography: Harry Neumann
- Edited by: Mildred Johnston
- Music by: Abe Meyer
- Production company: Liberty Pictures
- Distributed by: Liberty Pictures
- Release date: January 30, 1935
- Running time: 81 minutes
- Country: United States
- Language: English

Sweepstake Annie is a 1935 American comedy film directed by William Nigh and starring Tom Brown, Marian Nixon and Wera Engels.

== Cast ==
- Tom Brown as Bill Enright
- Marian Nixon as Annie Foster
- Wera Engels as Baroness Yvonne Baritska
- Inez Courtney as Marge
- Ivan Lebedeff as Baron Rudolph Baritska
- Lucien Littlefield as Henry Foster
- Dorothy Peterson as Mrs. Henry Foster
- William Janney as Arthur Foster
- Carol Tevis as Sally Foster
- King Baggot as Motion Picture Studio Executive
- Alec Craig as 2nd Sweepstakes Ticket Seller
- Sarah Edwards as Friend of Mrs. Foster
- Ralf Harolde as Hobart - Screenwriter
- Eddie Kane as Mr. Burns
- Jack Kennedy as 1st Sweepstakes Ticket Seller
- Wilbur Mack as One of the Baron's Associates
- Lucien Prival as Temperamental Director
- Maidel Turner as Friend of Mrs. Foster

== Bibliography ==
- Pitts, Michael R. Poverty Row Studios, 1929–1940: An Illustrated History of 55 Independent Film Companies, with a Filmography for Each. McFarland & Company, 2005.
