= Gustave Hamilton =

Belgian actor (1871–1951)

Gustave Honoré Hamilton (27 March 1871, in Brussels – 5 January 1951, in Villefranche-sur-Mer) was a 20th-century Belgian film actor.

He was the nephew of actor, theatre director and playwright Louis Péricaud and the uncle of actor Jacques Sablon.

== Filmography ==
- 1911: Fafarifla ou Le filtre magique by Gaston Velle - Fafarifla
- 1911: Pendaison à Jefferson City by Jean Durand
- 1912: La Chasse à l'homme / Cent dollars mort ou vif by Jean Durand
- 1912: Le Railway de la mort by Jean Durand
- 1912: Le Révolver matrimonial by Jean Durand
- 1928: The New Gentlemen by Jacques Feyder
- 1929: Mon béguin by Hans Behrendt
- 1930: Romance à l'inconnue by René Barberis
- 1931: English As It Is Spoken by Robert Boudrioz - Arthur
- 1931: Bombance by Pierre Billon - short film - La Tomate
- 1932: Un beau mariage by Charles-Félix Tavano - short film -
- 1932: Un client de province by Charles-Félix Tavano - short film - Fanchonnet
- 1932: Billeting Order by Charles-Félix Tavano - Frère Dingois
- 1933: Le témoin by Pierre de Cuvier - short film -
- 1933: Le Grillon du foyer by Robert Boudrioz - Caleb
- 1934: Pension Mimosas by Jacques Feyder
- 1934: Studio à louer by Jean-Louis Bouquet - short film - M. Le Menhir
- 1934: The Man with a Broken Ear by Robert Boudrioz - Le docteur renaud
- 1934: Maria Chapdelaine by Julien Duvivier - Le vieux Français
- 1935: La Figurante by Charles-Félix Tavano - short film - Le commissaire
- 1935: La Mariée du régiment by Maurice Cammage
- 1935: L'ami de Monsieur by Pierre de Cuvier - short film - Chantecaille
- 1936: Une gueule en or by Pierre Colombier
- 1936: The King by Pierre Colombier
- 1937: Le concierge revient de suite by Fernand Rivers - short film -
- 1937: Ne tuez pas Dolly by Jean Delannoy - short film -
- 1937: Boissière by Fernand Rivers
- 1937: Madelon's Daughter by Georges Pallu and Jean Mugeli
- 1937: People Who Travel by Jacques Feyder
- 1937: Nights of Fire by Marcel L'Herbier
- 1938: Son oncle de Normandie / La fugue de Jim Baxter by Jean Dréville
- 1939: Menaces by Edmond T. Gréville
- 1943: Les Enfants du Paradis by Marcel Carné - film tourné en deux époques - Le concierge du théâtre
- 1946: The Marriage of Ramuntcho by Max de Vaucorbeil
- 1947: Pour une nuit d'amour by Edmond T. Gréville
- 1948: The Pretty Miller Girl by Marcel Pagnol
- 1949: The King by Marc-Gilbert Sauvajon
- 1950: Guilty? by Yvan Noé
- 1950: Dominique by Yvan Noé - Le grand-père
