= Le Roi des montagnes =

The Le Roi des montagnes ("The king of the mountains") is a French-language novel published in 1857 by Edmond About. The work was translated into English by Mrs. Carlton A. Kingsbury for a 1897 Rand McNally edition. It was included in Project Gutenberg and is available as a free e-book, (February 15, 2013 [eBook #42096] Most recently updated: June 13, 2016). A film adaptation starring Lucile Saint-Simon and Claude Rollet was released in 1962.

== Synopsis ==
The story is set as a tale told to the author by a young German botanist fresh out of the University, named M. Hermann Schultz, who visits the author at his home. The narrator presents a vivid account of brigandry and corruption in mid-19th century Athens. However, incorrect Western colonialist thought is also evident in the book, and the story ends with a correspondent of the author denouncing it as having no basis in fact.

Schultz has been sent to Greece by the Hamburg Botanical Garden to study flora. Venturing out of Athens to search for rare plants, he meets a wealthy English mother (Mrs. Rebecca Simons) and daughter (Mary-Ann) touring Greece. All three are abducted by a band of brigands led by Hatzistavros (Hadgi-Stavros), "the king of the mountains". It becomes apparent the "king" is not a common outlaw but has enormous mystique among many Greeks for his role as a “palikar” (soldier) in the Greek War of Independence, and for his audacious robberies of even large groups of travelers protected by guards. He is so wealthy and well established that his operation is run as a company with investors, investments and financial reports. At the same time Hatzistavros is known for cruelty to his victims -- in one case congratulating a subordinate for killing an infant by throwing it into a fire after slaughtering all the other inhabitants of the child's village.

The English lady and daughter are ransomed for 100,000 francs. She is given two weeks to pay but vows not to, declaring her confidence in rescue by the Greek gendarmes. Schultz is given one month to come up with 15,000 francs, despite his protests of an impoverished family and employers with no way of paying. The king explains to Schultz that once he has set a ransom it must be paid on time or the captives killed, and the amount cannot be changed because, “I have a right to be unjust; I have not the right to be weak.”

Greek gendarmes do arrive, and promise the English women they are there to rescue them, but instead of fighting, their commander (Captain Pericles) converses cordially with the king and agrees to guard the prisoners while the king and his brigands go off to rob a government shipment of cash. The English women have their remaining jewelry and possessions taken from them by the Gendarmes, being told by the captain that these need to be kept as evidence at the king's (nonexistent) trial. The Greek-speaking Schultz is warned to keep silent about the conversation he has heard between the captain and king, as no one will believe him anyway.

In the mean time, Schultz has discovered by listening to the king's dictation that Hatzistavros’ London banker is the same firm, (Barley & Co.), as Mrs. Simon's late husband. Besotted with Simon's beautiful daughter, Schultz informs Simons of the situation and that she should be able to pay the ransom and later have it reimbursed from the king’s account. (A ruse Schultz hopes will win Mary-Ann's hand in marriage.)

Mrs. Simons and Mary-Ann depart, rewarding Schultz for his help not by paying his ransom, but by telling him that he should be able to escape without their help. Schultz's proceeds to attempt to gain freedom, but succeeds only in enraging the king to the point of his promising to torture Schultz to death.

The story ends with a rebellion among the brigands after Schultz poisons the king, and successful attack on the king's camp by Schultz's brave friends from Athens come to rescue him. The king decapitates the leader of the rebels, and announces his retirement from brigandage. The happy ending is complete except for the hoped for union with Mary-Ann who refuses to speak to Schultz, let alone marry him, when they meet again.
