= André Mauprey =

André Mauprey (19 August 1881 – 3 February 1939) was a French writer, composer, librettist, and actor. He helped to popularize The Three Penny Opera, and was the first to translate many of its songs into French.

Working with Robert de Mackiels and Serge Veber, he wrote the lyrics for the operetta Tip-Toes based on the melodies of George Gershwin.

His music and lyrics were sung by Édith Piaf, Juliette Gréco, Marianne Oswald, Marlene Dietrich, and Mathé Altéry.

== Discography ==
Most widely held works with lyrics by Andre Mauprey

- Complainte De Mackie (Mack the Knife)
- J'ai Laisse Mon Coeur
- Je T'ai Donné Mon Coeur
- Surabaya-Johnny
- Le Jazz Me Porte A La Peau
- Chanson De Barbara
- La Fiancée Du Pirate
- Jalousie

== Selected filmography ==
André Mauprey was a versatile artist, contributing as a writer, lyricist, composer, and actor to many films in the 1920s and 30s.

Screenplay

- Prince of the Six Days (1936)
- Le Baron tzigane (1935)
- Le Cavalier Lafleur (1934)
- Princesse Czardas (1934)
- L’Opéra de quat’sous (1931)

Composer

- En m'en foutant

Lyricist

- La belle aventure (1932)
- Amourous Adventure (1932)
- I Kiss Your Hand, Madame (1929)
- By Rocket to the Moon (1929)

Actor

- Midnight, Place Pigalle (1934)
