= Stjenka Rasin =

1936 film

- Directed by: Alexandre Volkoff
- Written by: Kurt Heynicke; Alf Teichs
- Produced by: Fred Lyssa; Vahayn Badal
- Starring: Wera Engels; Hans Adalbert Schlettow; Heinrich George
- Cinematography: Franz Weihmayr
- Edited by: Munni Obal
- Music by: Rudolf Perak
- Production company: Badal-Film
- Distributed by: Terra Film
- Release date: 1 May 1936
- Running time: 90 minutes
- Country: Germany
- Language: German

Stjenka Rasin is a 1936 German historical drama film directed by Alexandre Volkoff and starring Wera Engels, Hans Adalbert Schlettow and Heinrich George. It was shot at the Babelsberg Studios in Berlin. The film's sets were designed by the art directors Gustav A. Knauer and Alexander Mügge. It is also known by the alternative title Wolga, Wolga.

== Synopsis ==
The plot revolves around the Cossack Stenka Razin who leads a peasant uprising against the Tsarist authorities in seventeenth century Russia.

== Cast ==
- Wera Engels as Prinzessin Dolgoruki
- Hans Adalbert Schlettow as Stjenka Rasin
- Heinrich George as Fürst Dolgoruki
- Anton Pointner as Fürst Prosorowsky
- Rudolf Platte as Filka
- Olaf Bach as Wasska
- Philipp Manning as Zar Alexey Michailowitsch
- Wolfgang Keppler as Jegorka
- Hubert von Meyerinck as Borodin
- Hans Joachim Schaufuß as Nikolka

== Bibliography ==
- Rentschler, Eric. The Ministry of Illusion: Nazi Cinema and Its Afterlife. Harvard University Press, 1996.
- Klaus, Ulrich J. Deutsche Tonfilme: Jahrgang 1936. Klaus-Archiv, 1988.
- Waldman, Harry. Nazi Films in America, 1933-1942. McFarland, 2008.
