= Hélène Robert (actress) =

French actress

- Born: 27 January 1910; Tours, France
- Died: December 29, 1981 (aged 71); Paris, France
- Occupation: Actress
- Years active: 1930-1957

Hélène Robert (27 January 1910–29 December 1981) was a French film actress.

== Selected filmography ==
- Le Roi des resquilleurs (1930)
- The Malay Dagger (1931)
- The Yellow House of Rio (1931)
- Departure (1931)
- Orange Blossom (1932)
- His Best Client (1932)
- The Barber of Seville (1933)
- The Rosary (1934)
- I Like All the Women (1935)
- Bux the Clown (1935)
- The Hunter of Fall (1936)
- The King (1936)
- The Courier of Lyon (1937)
- Madelon's Daughter (1937)
- The West (1938)
- Fric-Frac (1939)
- Kissing Is No Sin (1950)

== Bibliography ==
- Goble, Alan. The Complete Index to Literary Sources in Film. Walter de Gruyter, 1999.
