= Hong Kong Nights (film) =

Film directed by E. Mason Hopper

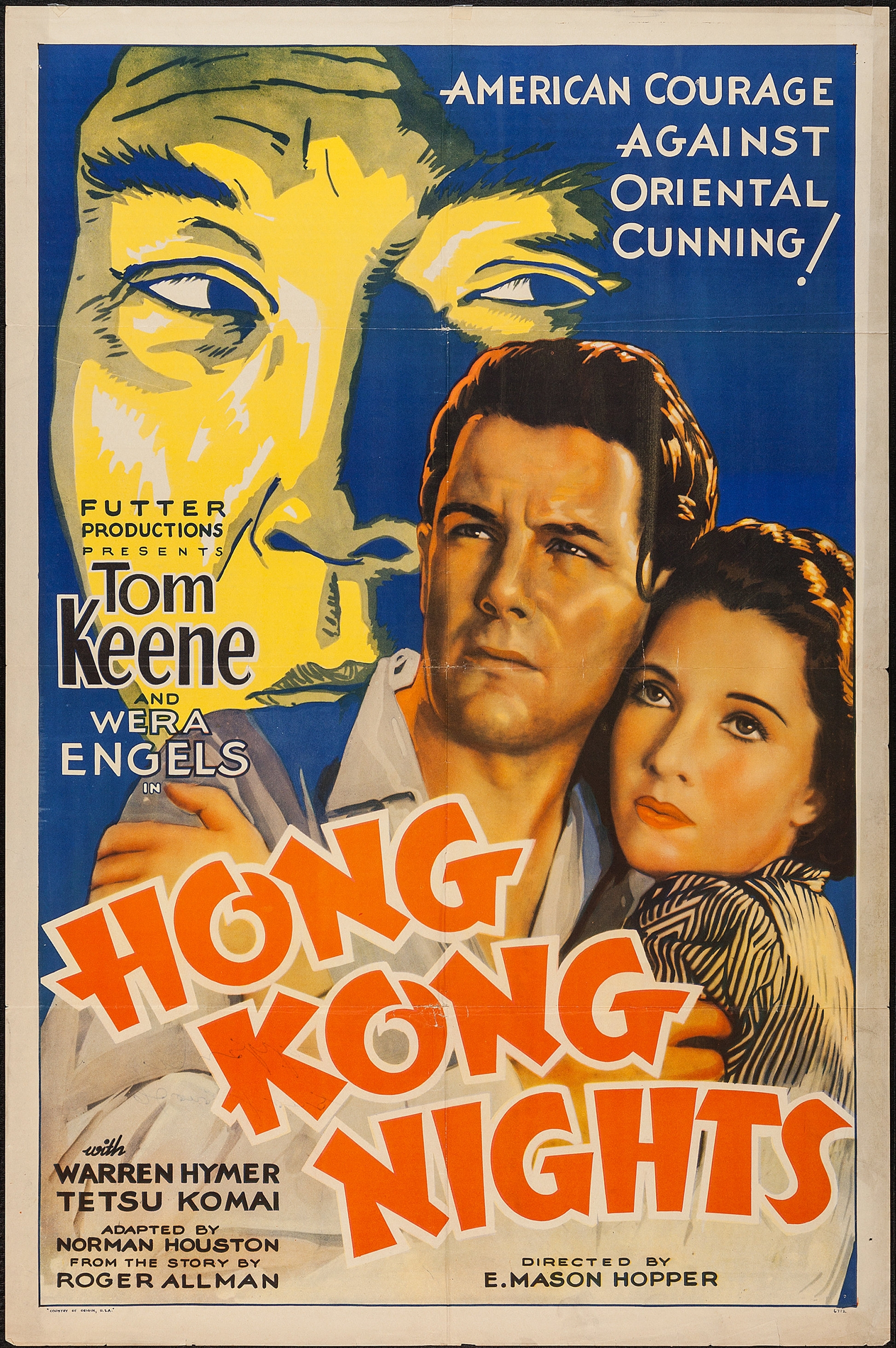
- Film poster
- Directed by: E. Mason Hopper
- Written by: Norman Houston; Roger Allman
- Produced by: Walter Futter; Fenn Kimball
- Starring: Tom Keene; Wera Engels; Warren Hymer
- Cinematography: Arthur Reed
- Production company: Walter Futter Productions
- Distributed by: First Division Pictures
- Release date: December 24, 1935
- Running time: 59 minutes
- Country: United States
- Language: English

Hong Kong Nights is a 1935 American thriller film directed by E. Mason Hopper and starring Tom Keene, Wera Engels and Warren Hymer. An American customs agent tracks gunrunners operating out of Hong Kong. The film had no original copyright registration nor renewal, and is considered to be in the public domain. (Note: The copyright catalogs for 1935-1936 as well as renewals for 1962-1964 did not show any for the film.) (Note: While the film does state that it is "copyrighted" in its title cards, this was not enough to garner copyright protection at the time.)

== Cast ==
- Tom Keene as Tom Keene
- Wera Engels as Trina Vidor
- Warren Hymer as Wally
- Tetsu Komai as Wong
- Cornelius Keefe as Gil Burris
- Tom London as Blake
- Freeman Lang as Capt. Evans
- Allan Cavan as Mr. Caulder

== Bibliography ==
- Pitts, Michael R. Poverty Row Studios, 1929–1940: An Illustrated History of 55 Independent Film Companies, with a Filmography for Each. McFarland & Company, 2005.
