= The Barber of Seville (1933 film) =

1933 film

- Belgian poster
- Directed by: Hubert Bourlon; Jean Kemm
- Written by: Pierre Beaumarchais (play); Pierre Maudru
- Produced by: Antoine de Rouvre; Jacques Schwob-d'Héricourt
- Starring: André Baugé; Fernand Charpin; Hélène Robert
- Cinematography: Marcel Lucien; Raoul Aubourdier; Raymond Clunie
- Edited by: Jean Feyte
- Production company: Société des Films Véga
- Distributed by: Sirius Films
- Release date: 29 December 1933
- Running time: 93 minutes
- Country: France
- Language: French

The Barber of Seville (French: Le barbier de Séville) is a 1933 French musical film directed by Hubert Bourlon and Jean Kemm and starring André Baugé, Fernand Charpin and Hélène Robert.

The film's sets were designed by the art director Robert Gys.

== Cast ==
- André Baugé as Figaro
- Fernand Charpin as Bazile
- Pierre Juvenet as Bartholo
- Hélène Robert as Rosine
- Nane Germon as Fanchette
- Yvonne Yma as Marcelline
- Monique Rolland as Chérubin
- Josette Day as Suzanne
- Jean Galland as Comte Almaviva

== Bibliography ==
- Crisp, Colin. Genre, Myth and Convention in the French Cinema, 1929-1939. Indiana University Press, 2002.
