= Prince of the Six Days =

1936 film

- Directed by: Robert Vernay
- Written by: André Mauprey
- Produced by: Maurice de Roock
- Starring: Adrien Lamy; René Ferté; Paulette Dubost
- Music by: Jacques Belasco
- Production company: C.I.T.A.C.
- Release date: 3 July 1936
- Running time: 97 minutes
- Country: France
- Language: French

Prince of the Six Days (French: Prince des Six Jours) is a 1936 French sports comedy film directed by Robert Vernay and starring Adrien Lamy, René Ferté and Paulette Dubost. It was filmed in 1933, but not released until three years later.

== Synopsis ==
Toto masquerades as a champion cyclist, Paul Prince, and enters the Six Days of Paris competition

== Cast ==
- Adrien Lamy as Victor Foin, dit 'Toto'
- Coecilia Navarre as Lily
- René Ferté as Paul Prince, le champion de cyclisme
- Marcel Vallée as Petitmaigre, le manager
- Paulette Dubost as Mona, la danseuse
- Robert Ancelin as Teddy, le barman
- Jean Arbuleau as Le speaker à le radio
- Paul Asselin as L'ami sérieux
- Bérétrot as Le speaker du Vel' d'Hiv'
- Raymond Cordy as le manager
- Robert Le Vigan as Fouilloux, un spectateur

== Bibliography ==
- Bessy, Maurice & Chirat, Raymond. Histoire du cinéma français: 1935-1939. Pygmalion, 1986.
- Crisp, Colin. Genre, Myth and Convention in the French Cinema, 1929-1939. Indiana University Press, 2002.
- Rège, Philippe. Encyclopedia of French Film Directors, Volume 1. Scarecrow Press, 2009.
