= The Hortensia Sisters =

1935 French film

- Directed by: René Guissart
- Written by: André Barde (operetta); Henri Duvernois (operetta); Henri Falk
- Produced by: René Guissart
- Starring: Meg Lemonnier; Lucien Baroux; Adrien Lamy
- Cinematography: René Colas; Enzo Riccioni
- Music by: Raoul Moretti
- Production company: Florés Films
- Distributed by: Les Distributeurs Parisiens
- Release date: 26 December 1935
- Running time: 100 minutes
- Country: France
- Language: French

The Hortensia Sisters (French: Les soeurs Hortensia) is a 1935 French musical comedy film directed by René Guissart and starring Meg Lemonnier, Lucien Baroux and Adrien Lamy. It was based on the operetta of the same title. The film's sets were designed by the art director René Renoux.

== Cast ==
- Meg Lemonnier as Aline / Marie
- Lucien Baroux as Monsieur Marmoud
- Adrien Lamy as Roland Ombreuse
- Albert Brouett as Byg
- Julien Carette as Mazareaud
- Charles Camus as le maître de ballet
- Robert Seller as Grabe
- Renée Dennsy as Lysiane
- Lucette Desmoulins as Phryné
- Thérèse Dorny as Madame Hormalin
- René Lestelly as Pitoleano
- Suzy Delair as Une femme au cabaret

== Bibliography ==
- Crisp, Colin. Genre, Myth and Convention in the French Cinema, 1929-1939. Indiana University Press, 2002.
- Goble, Alan. The Complete Index to Literary Sources in Film. Walter de Gruyter, 1999.
- Rège, Philippe. Encyclopedia of French Film Directors, Volume 1. Scarecrow Press, 2009.
