= The West (1938 film) =

1938 film by Henri Fescourt

- Directed by: Henri Fescourt
- Written by: Jacques Chabannes; Henry Kistemaeckers (play)
- Produced by: Claude Dolbert
- Starring: Charles Vanel; José Noguéro; Hélène Robert
- Cinematography: Raymond Agnel; Alain Douarinou
- Edited by: Jean Bert; André Gug
- Music by: Jane Bos
- Production company: Les Productions Claude Dolbert
- Distributed by: Pellegrin
- Release date: 16 February 1938
- Running time: 100 minutes
- Country: France
- Language: French

The West (French: L'occident) is a 1938 French drama film directed by Henri Fescourt and starring Charles Vanel, José Noguéro and Hélène Robert. It is a remake of the director's own 1928 silent film of the same title.

The film's sets were designed by the art director Jean Douarinou.

== Synopsis ==
The film portrays the relationship between a female Moroccan student, who has been forced to leave her studies at the Sorbonne for financial reasons and works as a dancer in a Paris nightclub, and a French naval officer. However, on returning to Casablanca she is tricked into believing that he had the led attack on her village that wiped out her family. She begins to plot her revenge.

== Cast ==
- Rama-Tahé as Hassina
- Charles Vanel as Jean Cadière
- José Noguéro as Armand
- André Bacqué as Linières
- Hélène Robert as Jacqueline
- Jules Berry as Max – Le portier
- Raymond Cordy as Carbonniès
- Robert Le Vigan as Taïeb el Haïn
- Roger Legris as Le Goff
- Georges Bever
- Joë Hamman
- Rosita Montenegro
- Marthe Mussine
- Suzy Pierson
- Gilbert Périgneaux
- Philippe Richard
- Monique Rolland
- Carmen Romero
- Serjius
- Henri Échourin

== Bibliography ==
- Kennedy-Karpat, Colleen. Rogues, Romance, and Exoticism in French Cinema of the 1930s. Fairleigh Dickinson, 2013.
