= English As It Is Spoken =

1931 film

- Directed by: Robert Boudrioz
- Written by: Tristan Bernard
- Based on: English As It Is Spoken by Tristan Bernard
- Starring: Félicien Tramel; Wera Engels; Gustave Hamilton
- Production company: Gaumont-Franco Film-Aubert
- Distributed by: Gaumont Distribution
- Release date: 12 June 1931
- Running time: 90 minutes
- Country: France
- Language: French

English As It Is Spoken (French: L'anglais tel qu'on le parle) is a 1931 French comedy film directed by Robert Boudrioz and starring Félicien Tramel, Wera Engels and Gustave Hamilton. It is an adaptation of an 1899 play of the same title by Tristan Bernard.

== Synopsis ==
A interpreter working in a Paris hotel has to be absent for a day and recruits a man to work as his replacement, despite the fact he doesn't speak any English. Complications ensue when he has to deal with a female British guest.

== Cast ==
- Félicien Tramel as Eugène
- Wera Engels as Miss Betty Hogson
- Gustave Hamilton as Arthur
- Maryanne as La caissière
- Roger Dann as Julien Cicandel
- Pierre Labry
- Nicole de Rouves
- Léon Courtois
- Albert Broquin
- Romain Gérard as Le caissier anglais myope

== Bibliography ==
- Bessy, Maurice & Chirat, Raymond. Histoire du cinéma français: 1929-1934. Pygmalion, 1988.
- Crisp, Colin. Genre, Myth and Convention in the French Cinema, 1929-1939. Indiana University Press, 2002.
- Goble, Alan. The Complete Index to Literary Sources in Film. Walter de Gruyter, 1999.
- Rège, Philippe. Encyclopedia of French Film Directors, Volume 1. Scarecrow Press, 2009.
