= Wera Engels =

German actress (1905–1988)

- Engels in 1933
- Born: 12 May 1905; Kiel, German Empire
- Died: 16 November 1988 (aged 83); Munich, West Germany
- Occupation: Actress
- Years active: 1926–1937
- Spouse: Ivan Lebedeff

Wera Engels (12 May 1905 – 16 November 1988) was a German actress. After successful leading roles in productions of the well-established German UFA-studios in Babelsberg as well as in France, she was invited to Hollywood. Producers saw her as a cheap alternative to Greta Garbo and Marlene Dietrich.

She was contracted with RKO. She and actress Mary Pickford reportedly became good friends. In 1935 she returned to Germany, but left soon thereafter. Back in Hollywood, she dated Gary Cooper for a while but married Russian actor and writer Ivan Lebedeff. After Lebedeff's death in 1953 of angina pectoris, she moved back to Europe, where she stayed with several friends in London and Stockholm before she returned to Germany. She lived the rest of her life with Erna Hoffmann (widow of Heinrich Hoffmann, Hitler's friend and personal photographer) in the Munich area.

== Filmography ==
- White Slave Traffic (1926)
- Lützow's Wild Hunt (1927)
- Did You Fall in Love Along the Beautiful Rhine? (1927)
- When the Guard Marches (1928)
- Befehl zur Ehe (1928)
- The Streets of London (1929)
- The Copper (1930)
- The Perfume of the Lady in Black (1931)
- Children of Fortune (1931)
- English As It Is Spoken (1931)
- The Ringer (1932)
- Lumpenkavaliere (1932)
- The Great Jasper (1933)
- Fugitive Road (1934)
- Sweepstake Annie (1935)
- Together We Live (1935)
- The Great Impersonation (1935)
- Hong Kong Nights (1935)
- Stjenka Rasin (1936)
- Talking About Jacqueline (1937)
