= La Madelon =

World War I song in french

La Madelon or Quand Madelon, also known in English as Madelon (I'll Be True to the Whole Regiment) is a French popular song of World War I. Although it is mostly known as La Madelon the proper title is Quand Madelon which are the beginning words of the refrain. The lyrics are by Louis Bousquet (1914) and the music by Camille Robert.

The song tells a story about soldiers flirting with a lovely young waitress in a country tavern and may partly owe its long term popularity to the fact that the lyrics were clean at a time when soldiers' songs were mostly bawdy and rude. It was one of the most popular songs in France during World War I and became a patriotic song as the war wore on. It remains a patriotic, well-known song in France to this day. It also became popular among Spanish soldiers.

It was revived in World War II and Marlene Dietrich sang it in Paris in 1939 during the celebration of the national day of 14 July.

The 1937 French film Madelon's Daughter made reference to the song. The 1955 French film La Madelon, directed by Jean Boyer was a comedy based on Madelon's legend starring the great Line Renaud who plays the title character and sings the song surrounded by soldiers. Spanish actress-singer Sara Montiel sang it in the box office hit movie El Último Cuplé (Juan de Orduña, Spain 1957). The soundtrack album was also an international success.

== Lyrics ==
| French lyrics | Literal Translation | Contemporary verse translation |
|---|---|---|
| Pour le repos, le plaisir du militaire, Il est là-bas à deux pas de la forêt Une maison aux murs tout couverts de lierre « Aux Tourlourous » c'est le nom du cabaret. La servante est jeune et jolie Légère comme un papillon. Comme son vin son œil pétille, Nous l'appelons la Madelon; Nous en rêvons la nuit, nous y pensons le jour, Ce n'est que Madelon mais pour nous c'est l'amour | At rest, a soldier's recreation Is just a stone's throw away from the forest A house with ivy-covered walls "The Recruit's" is the name of the Cabaret; The waitress is young and pretty, As light as a butterfly, As her wine, so her eye sparkles, We call her "Madelon"; We dream of her at night, we think of her in day, It is only Madelon whom we love. | There is a tavern way down in Brittany; Where weary soldiers take their liberty, The keeper's daughter whose name is Madelon; Pours out the wine while they laugh and carry on, And while the wine goes to their senses, Her sparkling glance goes to their hearts, Their admiration so intense is Each one his tale of love imparts, She coquettes with them all, but favors none at all, And here's the way they banter ev'ry time they call: |
| Refrain Quand Madelon vient nous servir à boire Sous la tonnelle on frôle son jupon Et chacun lui raconte une histoire Une histoire à sa façon La Madelon pour nous n'est pas sévère Quand on lui prend la taille ou le menton Elle rit, c'est tout le mal qu'elle sait faire Madelon, Madelon, Madelon! | Refrain When Madelon serves us all our drinks Beneath the arbor we keep by her And everyone tells her a story Each telling a different story Madelon is not angry at us When we hold her waist or her chin, She laughs, it's all she can do: Madelon, Madelon, Madelon! | Refrain "O Madelon you are the only one, O Madelon for you we'll carry on, It's so long since we have seen a miss, Won't you give us just a kiss?" But Madelon she takes it all in fun, She laughs and says, "You see, it can't be done, I would like but how can I consent When I'm true to the whole regiment!" |
| Nous avons tous au pays une payse Qui nous attend et que l'on épousera Mais elle est loin, bien trop loin pour qu'on lui dise Ce qu'on fera quand la classe rentrera En comptant les jours on soupire Et quand le temps nous semble long Tout ce qu'on ne peut pas lui dire On va le dire à Madelon; On l'embrasse dans les coins. Elle dit « veux-tu finir… » On s'figure que c'est l'autre, ça nous fait bien plaisir. | We all have a maiden in the countryside Who is waiting for us and we'll some day marry, But she is far, too far, truth be told, When what will we do until us soldiers return, Counting the days we sigh? And when the time seems long, All we cannot tell others We tell Madelon. We kiss her in dim corners, she asks, "Do you want to finish? We imagine it's the other one, it makes us very happy | She knows a Captain who twirls a big mustache, She knows a Colonel whose eyes with anger flash, She gives them both the sweetest kind of smile, And now and then chats with each a little while. Just when his talk gets interesting, The other hollers for some wine, She laughs and skips away suggesting They'll talk again some other time She never answers "Yes" she never tells them "No"; And here's the song they're singing when they come and go: |
| Un caporal en képi de fantaisie S'en fut trouver Madelon un beau matin Et, fou d'amour, lui dit qu'elle était jolie Et qu'il venait pour lui demander sa main La Madelon, pas bête, en somme, Lui répondit en souriant: Et pourquoi prendrais-je un seul homme Quand j'aime tout un régiment ? Tes amis vont venir. Tu n'auras pas ma main J'en ai bien trop besoin pour leur verser du vin | A corporal in a fancy kepi Met with Madelon one morning And, madly in love, told her she was pretty, And asked for her hand in marriage But Madelon, not stupid, in short Replied to him with a smile: "Why should I take one man When I love the whole regiment? Your friends will come, you will not have my hand, I have too much need to serve wine. | |
