= Pierre Juvenet =

French actor (1883–1951)

- Born: 9 May 1883; Lyon, France
- Died: 13 October 1951 (aged 68); Neuilly-sur-Seine, France
- Occupation: Actor
- Years active: 1912-1950 (film)

Pierre Juvenet (1883–1951) was a French stage and film actor. A character actor, he appeared in more than a hundred films frequently portraying officials and authority figures.

== Selected filmography ==
- The Mystery of the Yellow Room (1930)
- The Night Is Ours (1930)
- Tenderness (1930)
- The Shark (1930)
- The King of Paris (1930)
- Holiday (1931)
- The Marriage of Mademoiselle Beulemans (1932)
- The Blaireau Case (1932)
- My Priest Among the Rich (1932)
- The Barber of Seville (1933)
- Mannequins (1933)
- The Red Robe (1933)
- To Be Loved (1933)
- Toto (1933)
- The Adventurer (1934)
- The Midnight Prince (1934)
- The Rosary (1934)
- Fanatisme (1934)
- Little One (1935)
- Gaspard de Besse (1935)
- Divine (1935)
- The Call of Silence (1936)
- Marinella (1936)
- Forty Little Mothers (1936)
- The Pearls of the Crown (1937)
- Marthe Richard (1937)
- The Red Dancer (1937)
- Adrienne Lecouvreur (1938)
- Monsieur Breloque Has Disappeared (1938)
- Alexis, Gentleman Chauffeur (1938)
- Stolen Life (1939)
- The Emigrant (1940)
- Love Around the Clock (1943)
- As Long as I Live (1946)
- Back Streets of Paris (1946)
- Les aventures de Casanova (1947)
- Not Guilty (1947)
- Memories Are Not for Sale (1948)
- Clochemerle (1948)
- Gigi (1949)
- The Cupid Club (1949)
- The Ladies in the Green Hats (1949)
- The Treasure of Cantenac (1950)
- Just Me (1950)

== Bibliography ==
- Powrie, Phil & Rebillard, Éric. Pierre Batcheff and stardom in 1920s French cinema. Edinburgh University Press, 2009.
