= Jean Marchat =

French actor

- Born: 8 June 1902; Grigny, Metropolis of Lyon; France
- Died: 2 October 1966 (aged 64); Neuilly-sur-Seine, Hauts-de-Seine; France
- Other name: Jean Pierre Marchat
- Occupation: Film actor
- Years active: 1931 - 1966

Jean Marchat (1902–1966) was a French film actor who appeared in around fifty films during his career. He made his film debut in 1931 and appeared in Maurice Tourneur's Departure the same year.

== Selected filmography ==
- Departure (1931)
- The Malay Dagger (1931)
- Checkmate (1931)
- In the Name of the Law (1932)
- The Case of Doctor Brenner (1933)
- Stormy Waters (1941)
- The Pavilion Burns (1941)
- Sideral Cruises (1942)
- Colonel Pontcarral (1942)
- Mermoz (1943)
- Majestic Hotel Cellars (1945)
- The Mysterious Monsieur Sylvain (1947)
- Last Chance Castle (1947)
- Three Boys, One Girl (1948)
- The Barton Mystery (1949)
- Véronique (1950)
- Shadow and Light (1951)
- The Passerby (1951)
- The Red Needle (1951)
- They Were Five (1952)
- Zoé (1954)
- Nights of Montmartre (1955)
- Mademoiselle from Paris (1955)
- Napoléon (1955)
- The Miracle of the Wolves (1961)
- Climates of Love (1962)
- The Other Truth (1966)

== Bibliography ==
- Waldman, Harry. Maurice Tourneur: The Life and Films. McFarland, 2008.
