= Palmirinha Onofre =

Brazilian cook and television presenter (1931–2023)

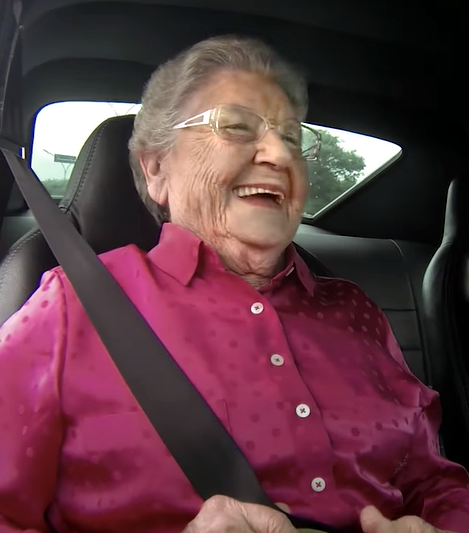
- Onofre in 2018
- Born: 29 June 1931; Bauru, São Paulo, Brazil
- Died: 7 May 2023 (aged 91); São Paulo, Brazil
- Occupations: Cook and television presenter

Palmira Nery da Silva Onofre (29 June 1931 – 7 May 2023), popularly known as Palmirinha Onofre [pawmiˈɾĩɲɐ oˈnɔfɾi] or Vovó Palmirinha (transl. Grandma Palmirinha), was a Brazilian cook and television presenter. She hosted or participated in several television shows, including Note e Anote, TV Culinária, and Programa da Palmirinha.

== Biography ==
Onofre was born on 29 June 1931 in Bauru, São Paulo. She first practiced cooking at the age of five with her mother and grandmother. She was raised in an abusive home in which she was abused sexually by her father and physically by her mother. Her father sent her away to live with a French woman, who assisted Onofre in developing her cooking. Onofre returned to her family after her father's death and worked to support them, but she was again mistreated, including times in which she was locked out of the house at night. She was set to be sold to a farmer by her mother when she was 16 years old, but her aunt prevented the transaction. Onofre married at the age of 19 to get away from her family, but this relationship proved to be abusive as well. She had three daughters during her marriage. Afraid of the stigma associated with divorce, she remained with her husband for about 20 years before she had enough money to support her daughters independently.

Onofre first appeared on television at the age of 63 when she appeared on TV Bandeirantes with Silvia Poppovic in 1994. This appearance earned her an invitation from Ana Maria Braga onto Note e Anote the same year. Though originally intended to appear on the show only once, she became a regular presenter, participating on the show for five years. While on this program, she became associated with the nickname "Palmirinha". She participated on Note e Anote for the following five years until she was given her own program, TV Culinária, on TV Gazeta in 1999. She worked on this program for 11 years before moving to Bem Simples where she hosted Programa da Palmirinha until 2015. In 2017, she appeared in the film Internet: O Filme. She appeared as a judge on the cooking reality show Chef ao Pé do Ouvido in 2019.

Onofre was hospitalized for kidney issues on 11 April 2023, and she died on 7 May 2023 at age 91. Consolations were given by several Brazilian figures, including President Luiz Inácio Lula da Silva.

== Legacy ==
Onofre is commonly described as the "grandmother" of Brazil. She was known for her use of a puppet named Guinho as a supporting character while presenting.

== Filmography ==
- Note e Anote (1994–1999)
- TV Culinária (1999–2010)
- Programa da Palmirinha (2012–2015)
- Internet - O Filme (2017)
- Chef ao Pé do Ouvido (2019)
