= Roger Goupillières =

French film director and screenwriter

- Born: 22 September 1896; Rouen, France
- Died: 20 December 1988 (aged 92); Paris
- Years active: 1926 - 1938

Roger Goupillières (22 September 1896 - 20 December 1988) was a French film director and screenwriter.

== Filmography ==
=== Director ===
- 1926: La Petite Fonctionnaire
- 1928:In Old Stamboul
- 1929: La Voix de sa maîtresse
- 1931: The Malay Dagger
- 1931: Checkmate
- 1933: Knock
- 1936: The Lady from Vittel
- 1938: Chipée

=== Assistant-director ===
- 1930: Mon gosse de père by Jean de Limur

=== Screenwriter ===
- 1928: Jaima la double
