= Departure (1931 film) =

1931 film directed by Maurice Tourneur

- Directed by: Maurice Tourneur
- Written by: Maurice Tourneur
- Based on: Departure by Roland Dorgelès
- Produced by: Bernard Natan; Émile Natan
- Starring: Jean Marchat; Simone Cerdan; Gaby Basset
- Cinematography: Georges Benoît; Henri Barreyre
- Edited by: Jacques Tourneur
- Music by: Roland Manuel
- Production company: Pathé-Natan
- Distributed by: Pathé-Natan
- Release date: 14 September 1931
- Running time: 99 minutes
- Country: France
- Language: French

Departure (French: Partir) is a 1931 French drama film directed by Maurice Tourneur and starring Jean Marchat, Simone Cerdan and Gaby Basset. It was based on a novel by Roland Dorgelès. It was shot at the Saint-Maurice Studios in Paris. The film's sets were designed by the art director Jacques Colombier.

== Synopsis ==
An opera singer travelling with her company on a passenger ship for a tour of French Indochina, encounters a mysterious young man who she falls in love with.

== Cast ==
- Jean Marchat as Jacques Largy
- Simone Cerdan as Florence Bernard
- Ginette d'Yd as Odette Nicolai
- Gaby Basset as Carmen
- Charles Prince as Le comique
- Fichel as Prater
- Gaston Mauger as Félix, le directeur
- Georges Paulais as Le docteur
- Charles Barrois as Le commissaire de bord
- Jacques Anderson as Le lieutenant blond
- Lugné-Poe as Daniel Garrot
- Hélène Robert as Micaella
- Christiane Tourneur as Musette
- Mary Ganesco as Madame Pascalin

== Bibliography ==
- Waldman, Harry. Maurice Tourneur: The Life and Films. McFarland, 2008.
