= The Malay Dagger =

1931 film

- Directed by: Roger Goupillières
- Written by: Jean Aragny; Tristan Bernard
- Starring: Jean Marchat; Gaby Basset; Jean Toulout
- Cinematography: Fédote Bourgasoff; René Colas
- Music by: Jean Eblinger
- Production company: Pathé-Natan
- Distributed by: Pathé Consortium Cinéma
- Release date: 30 January 1931
- Running time: 60 minutes
- Country: France
- Language: French

The Malay Dagger (French: Le poignard malais) is a 1931 French crime film directed by Roger Goupillières and starring Jean Marchat, Gaby Basset and Jean Toulout. It was based on a short story by Tristan Bernard. It was shot at the Joinville Studios of Pathé-Natan in Paris. The film's sets were designed by the art director Jacques Colombier.

== Cast ==
- Jean Marchat as Lucien Moutier
- Gaby Basset as Maggy
- Jean Toulout as Moutier
- Charlotte Barbier-Krauss as Mme. Moutier
- Gilbert Périgneaux as Pierre
- Jeanne Méa as Mlle. de Saint-Verneau
- Hélène Robert as Anna
- Nicole Martel
- Florelle

== Bibliography ==
- Bessy, Maurice & Chirat, Raymond. Histoire du cinéma français: 1929-1934. Pygmalion, 1988.
- Crisp, Colin. Genre, Myth and Convention in the French Cinema, 1929-1939. Indiana University Press, 2002.
- Goble, Alan. The Complete Index to Literary Sources in Film. Walter de Gruyter, 1999.
- Rège, Philippe. Encyclopedia of French Film Directors, Volume 1. Scarecrow Press, 2009.
