= Cléo de Verberena =

Brazilian actress and film director

Cleo de Verberena
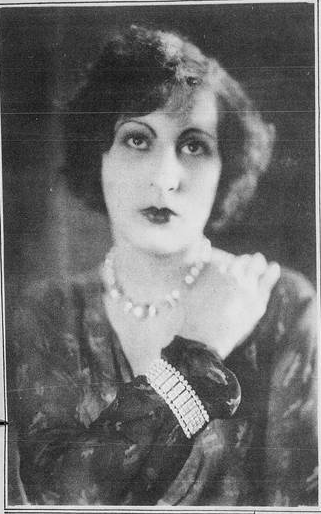
- Born: Jacira Martins da Silveira; 26 June 1904; Amparo, São Paulo, Brazil
- Died: 6 October 1972 (aged 68); São Paulo, Brazil
- Citizenship: Brazilian, Chilean
- Occupations: Actress, film director, film producer
- Children: César Augusto Melani
- Parents: José Martins Ribeiro Jr. (father); Júlia Pereira da Silveira (mother)

Jacyra Martins da Silveira (26 June 1904 – 6 October 1972), known by her stage name Cleo de Verberena, was a Brazilian actress and film director. She is widely considered as the first Brazilian woman to direct a film: 1931's O Mistério do Dominó Preto.

== Biography ==
Jacyra Martins Silveira was born on June 26, 1904, in the city of Amparo. During the 1920s she moved to São Paulo. She fell in love with cinema; her favorite directors were von Stroheim and Fred Niblo, and her favorite actress was Greta Garbo.

There she met Cesar Melani, the son of Ângelo Melani and Amabile Facci, landowners of Franca, with whom she would eventually marry and have one child, Cesar Augusto. In 1930, they founded their studio, EPICA-FILM, in the district of Santa Cecilia, in São Paulo. Jacyra adopted the artist name Cléo de Verberena, and Melani called himself Laes Mac Reni.

EPICA-FILM's first and only production was O Mistério do Dominó Preto (The Mystery of the Black Domino), based on the novel written by Martinho Correa. The feature movie was directed by and starring Cléo de Verberena; her husband also worked in the production and as actor. Cleo also worked on stage plays with the ViaLáctea group during 1931.

In 1932 she moved with her family to Rio de Janeiro to promote O Mistério and to try to find some work in the industry. Her participation at the movie industry was, although, restricted to O Mistério do Dominó Preto. She didn't have any other participation in movies.

Cesar Melani died in 1935 and Jacyra did not get involved with cinema anymore. She married a few years later the Chilean consul Francisco Landestoy Saint Jean, moving with him to England and then Chile. Francisco died in 1953. Cleo, no longer married, settled in São Paulo with his son Cesar.

Cleo died on October 6, 1972, in São Paulo.

Cleo de Verberena, Brazilian pioneer, is the subject of the doctoral thesis of Marcella Grecco de Araujo, from University of São Paulo.
