= Gaby Basset =

French actress

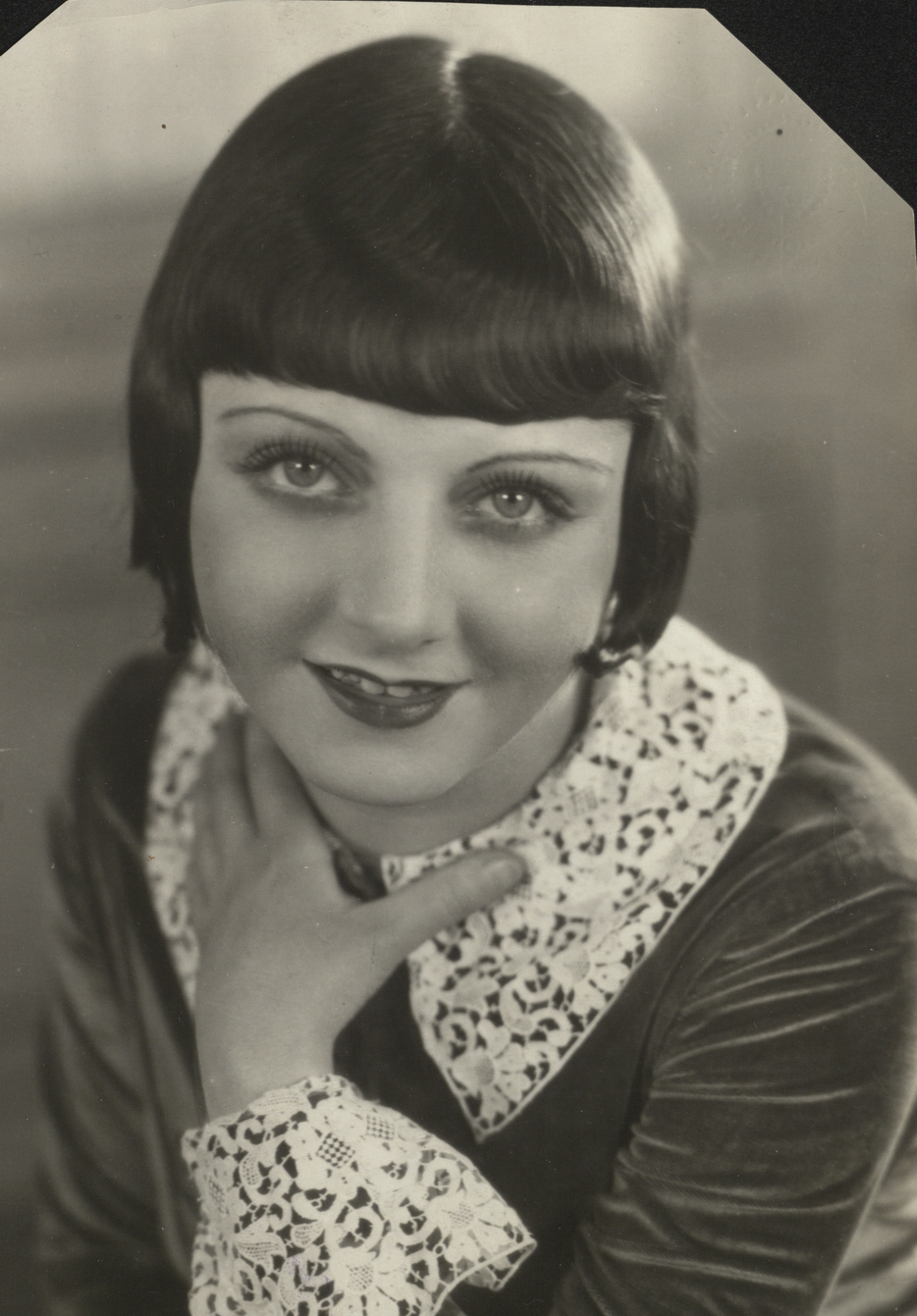
- Born: Marie-Louise Camille Basset; 29 March 1902; Varennes-Saint-Sauveur, France
- Died: 7 October 2001 (aged 99); Neuilly-sur-Seine, France
- Occupation: Actress
- Years active: 1930–1968 (film)

Gaby Basset (29 March 1902 – 7 October 2001) was a French film actress.

== Selected filmography ==
- Everybody Wins (1930) – Simone
- The Malay Dagger (1931) – Maggy
- Departure (1931) – Carmen
- Par habitude (1932) – Madame Roussel
- Mannequins (1933) – Rose
- Pour être aimé (1933)
- Le coq du régiment (1933)
- Les deux 'Monsieur' de Madame (1933) – Léonie
- Le gros lot (1933)
- The Fakir of the Grand Hotel (1934) – Titi
- La châtelaine du Liban (1934) – Maroussia
- Prince Jean (1934) – Fernande
- Un tour de cochon (1934)
- Justin de Marseille (1935) – Mado (uncredited)
- La vierge du rocher (1935) – La petite Anna
- Le tampon du colonel (1935)
- La rosière des Halles (1935) – Françoise
- Fanfare of Love (1935) – Poupette
- Un soir de bombe (1935) – Lily
- La coqueluche de ces dames (1935)
- La mariée du régiment (1936)
- Sacré Léonce (1936) – Fifine
- Disk 413 (1936) – Cécile Meunier
- 27 Rue de la Paix (1936) – Alice Perrin aka Jeanne Pinson
- The Secrets of the Red Sea (1937) – Anita
- Le tigre du Bengale (1938)
- The Indian Tomb (1938) – Mme. Morin
- The Porter from Maxim's (1939) – Crici
- Fire in the Straw (1939) – Reine Roy
- A Hole in the Wall (1950) – La cliente
- Le tampon du capiston (1950) – (uncredited)
- Lost Souvenirs (1950) – (uncredited)
- The Nude Dancer (1952) – Justine
- Double or Quits (1953) – Une voisine
- Mandat d'amener (1953) – La dame des livres
- Their Last Night (1953) – La prostituée
- Women of Paris (1953) – Henriette, l'employée des lavabos
- Touchez pas au grisbi (1954) – Marinette
- My Seven Little Sins (1954) – Maria
- House on the Waterfront (1955) – Madame Aimée
- La rue des bouches peintes (1955) – Madame Jules
- Tant qu'il y aura des femmes (1955) – Hortense Géricault
- Gas-Oil (1955) – Camille Serin
- Deadlier Than the Male (1956) – La femme de charge de la guinguette
- Diary of a Bad Girl (1956) – La patronne
- Le pays d'où je viens (1956) – Le cassière
- Speaking of Murder (1957) – Hortense
- Miss Catastrophe (1957) – Monique
- Le coin tranquille (1957) – (uncredited)
- La polka des menottes (1957) – La trompettiste
- Sinners of Paris (1958) – L'habilleuse
- Maigret Sets a Trap (1958) – Une bonne (uncredited)
- Le temps des oeufs durs (1958) – Martine Grandvivier
- First of May (1958) – Une infirmière
- Gangster Boss (1959) – La mère d'Etienne (uncredited)
- Archimède le clochard (1959) – Mme Grégoire
- Way of Youth (1959) – Lucette, la soeur de Tiercelin
- Rue des prairies (1959) – Mme Gildas
- L'ours (1960)
- Les honneurs de la guerre (1961) – Madame Sauvage
- Alerte au barrage (1961)
- The Devil and the Ten Commandments (1962) – L'habilleuse (segment "Tes père et mère honoreras")
- Drôle de jeu (1968) – (final film role)

== Bibliography ==
- Goble, Alan. The Complete Index to Literary Sources in Film. Walter de Gruyter, 1999.
