= Holiday (1931 film) =

1931 film

- Directed by: Robert Boudrioz
- Written by: Roger Féral
- Based on: Vacances; 1931 play by René Besson; Georges Fabret
- Starring: Florelle; Lucien Gallas; Georges Charlia
- Cinematography: Raoul Aubourdier; Paul Guichard
- Music by: Jacqueline Batell; Lionel Cazaux
- Production company: Gaumont-Franco Film-Aubert
- Distributed by: Gaumont-Franco Film-Aubert
- Release date: 15 January 1932 (General release)
- Running time: 82 minutes
- Country: France
- Language: French

Holiday (French: Vacances) is a 1931 French comedy film directed by Robert Boudrioz and starring Florelle, Lucien Gallas and Georges Charlia. It is an adaptation of the French play of the same name by René Besson and Georges Fabret.

The film's sets were designed by the art director Georges Wakhévitch.

== Plot summary ==
A young office worker believes he needs both a mistress and a car to maintain his social standing. When his mistress proves unfaithful and his car lets him down, he ends up spending his holiday with his friend Millet, a vacation without women or wheels.

== Cast ==
- Florelle as Paulette
- Lucien Gallas as Jacques Sarmette
- Georges Charlia as Millet
- Rachelly as La servante de l'auberge
- Pierre Juvenet as Le Hubleau-Mornac

== Bibliography ==
- Goble, Alan. The Complete Index to Literary Sources in Film. Walter de Gruyter, 1999.
