= Checkmate (1931 French film) =

1931 film

- Directed by: Roger Goupillières
- Starring: Dolly Davis; Jean Marchat; Jean-Pierre Aumont
- Cinematography: Fédote Bourgasoff
- Music by: Ralph Erwin
- Production company: Pathé-Natan
- Distributed by: Pathé-Natan
- Release date: 21 August 1931
- Running time: 75 minutes
- Country: France
- Language: French

Checkmate (French: Échec et mat) is a 1931 French mystery crime film directed by Roger Goupillières and starring Dolly Davis, Jean Marchat and Jean-Pierre Aumont. It was shot at the Joinville Studios of Pathé-Natan in Paris. The film's sets were designed by the art director Lucien Aguettand.

== Synopsis ==
Claude Darblet plans a joke with two of his friends. One of them will pretend to be murdered, with the evidence all pointing at Claude before the prank is revealed. Things then take a dramatic turn when he really turns up dead.

== Cast ==
- Dolly Davis as Aline Rouvray
- Ginette d'Yd as Simone
- Jean Marchat as Claude Darblet
- Jean-Pierre Aumont as Jacques
- Rolla Norman as Monsieur Sylvestre
- Adrien Lamy as Lagoupille
- Daniel Lecourtois as Robert Manoy
- Fernand Mailly as Le commissaire
- Georges Paulais as Le juge
- Robert Tourneur as L'avocat

== Bibliography ==
- Bessy, Maurice & Chirat, Raymond. Histoire du cinéma français: 1929-1934. Pygmalion, 1988.
- Crisp, Colin. Genre, Myth and Convention in the French Cinema, 1929-1939. Indiana University Press, 2002.
- Rège, Philippe. Encyclopedia of French Film Directors, Volume 1. Scarecrow Press, 2009.
