= Mário Peixoto =

Brazilian film director (1908–1992)

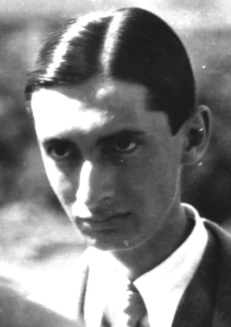
- Born: Mário Rodrigues Breves Peixoto; March 3, 1908; Brussels, Belgium
- Died: February 3, 1992 (aged 83); Rio de Janeiro, Brazil
- Occupation: Filmmaker

Mário Rodrigues Breves Peixoto ([ˈmaɾju pejˈʃotu]; March 3, 1908 – February 3, 1992) was a Brazilian film director, mainly known for his only film Limite, a silent experimental film filmed in 1930 and premiered in Rio de Janeiro on 17 May 1931. Peixoto wrote, directed and took up a minor role in the film. Its musical score includes Erik Satie, Claude Debussy, Alexander Borodin, Igor Stravinsky, Sergei Prokofiev and César Franck.

The single-handed achievement of a member of the well-to-do élite of 1920s Brazil, Limite became over the years almost a myth — its only copy being almost lost during the 1950s, were it not restored thanks to the personal efforts of two 1970s critics — and the object of various legends, many of them put into circulation by Peixoto himself. One such legend referred to a bogus complimentary article about the film ("A film from South America"), that had supposedly been written by Sergei Eisenstein and published, in English translation, in the trendy London magazine Tatler. Only after Peixoto admitted, shortly before his death, that he had himself written the supposed "Portuguese translation" of "Eisenstein's" article, was the general credence given to this legend in Brazil withdrawn.

Nevertheless, the restoration of the surviving copy and renewed viewing in the 1970s and 1980s aroused interest in the actual movie. In 1988, the Cinemateca Brasileira named it the best Brazilian film of all time. In 1995 Limite was once again declared as such, according to a national inquiry held by the newspaper Folha de S.Paulo.

In 1996, director and producer Walter Salles found the hoard of documents and props that was to become the Mário Peixoto Archive in a stash at his firm VideoFilmes in Rio, where currently Saulo Pereira de Mello takes care of the original manuscripts and objects . Pereira de Mello also edits publications by and on Peixoto. Onde a terra acaba ("At the edge of the earth"), the title of one of Peixoto’s unfinished projects; is also the name of a 2001 documentary film on Peixoto, directed by Salles' former aide Sérgio Machado.

Around the same period in which Limite was being planned and filmed, Mário Peixoto also began to write and publish. In 1931, he released a collection of poems called Mundéu (republished in 1996) which is characterized by a strong modernist accent and has a foreword by Mário de Andrade. In the same year Peixoto published, in a magazine called Bazar, three short stories and a play, that are part of a collection published by Saulo Pereira de Mello in 2004: Seis contos e duas peças curtas which also includes undated and up till then unpublished material written by Mário. In 2002, another collection of poems written between 1930 and 1960, Poemas de permeio com o mar was published. In 1933 Mário published, as a private edition, his first and only novel, O inútil de cada um (republished in 1996). From 1968 on Mário reworked his 1933 original, using it as a basis for an intended extended version that was to be divided in six volumes. So far only the first volume, O inútil de cada um – Itamar has been published, in 1984, through the personal intervention of Jorge Amado, with whom Mário had worked on one of his film projects.

There are few publications in English on Mario Peixoto or Limite, described by French film historian Georges Sadoul as an "unknown masterpiece". In 2006, Michael Korfmann edited a volume that offers ten contemporary views regarding the genesis, aesthetic and reception of the film, gathering contributions by filmmakers and writers from Brazil, Great Britain and the United States including Walter Salles, Saulo Pereira de Mello, Carlos Augusto Calil, William M. Drew, Alexander Graf, Paulo Venancio Filho, Constança Hertz, Aparecida do Carmo Frigeri Berchior, Marco Lucchesi and Marcelo Noah as well as a rare article written by Mário Peixoto himself.

In November 2010, a further restoration of Limite premiered in Brooklyn, New York.

== Filmography ==
Year	Title	Role	Notes
1931	Limite	Man Sitting at the Cemetery	Role uncredited, also director, producer, writer, editor and music department.
