= Limite =

1931 film

- Directed by: Mário Peixoto
- Written by: Mário Peixoto
- Produced by: Mário Peixoto
- Starring: Olga Breno; Taciana Rey; Raul Schnoor
- Cinematography: Edgar Brasil
- Edited by: Mário Peixoto
- Release dates: 17 May 1931 (Brazilian premiere, Capitol Theatre, Rio de Janeiro)
- Running time: 120 minutes
- Country: Brazil
- Language: Portuguese

Limite (Brazilian Portuguese: [liˈmitʃi], Portuguese for "limit", "border" or "edge") is a 1931 Brazilian silent experimental psychological drama film directed, written, and produced by Mário Peixoto. The film was inspired by a photograph by André Kertész and was shot in 1930, with its first screening taking place in 1931. It is often considered one of the earliest experimental feature films.

The film tells the story of two unnamed women and an unnamed man drifting in a small boat. As they float aimlessly, they reflect on their pasts through flashbacks. One woman escaped from prison but is still being pursued, the other left an unhappy marriage, and the man is grieving the loss of a lover. Tired and without hope, they stop rowing and let the boat drift.

Limite was restored between 1966 and 1978 from a single damaged nitrate print, though one scene remains missing. Despite its limited release, incomplete condition, and the fact that Peixoto never made another film, Limite received praise from critics and filmmakers, including Georges Sadoul and Walter Salles. It has since gained a cult following and is frequently mentioned as one of the greatest Brazilian films of all time.

== Plot ==
Limite.

In Limite, a man and two women are stranded in a rowboat, drifting aimlessly at sea. Tired and without hope, they stop rowing and let the currents take them. As they float, their pasts are revealed through flashbacks, each marked by changes in the music.

One woman, a seamstress, escaped from prison with the help of a guard. She tried to start over in a new city but had to flee again when she saw in the newspapers that the police were still looking for her. The other woman left her unhappy marriage to an alcoholic pianist, tired of his coldness and lack of care. The man, a widower, shares that he fell in love with a married woman. Later, while visiting his late wife’s grave, he learned from the woman’s husband that she had leprosy.

== Background ==
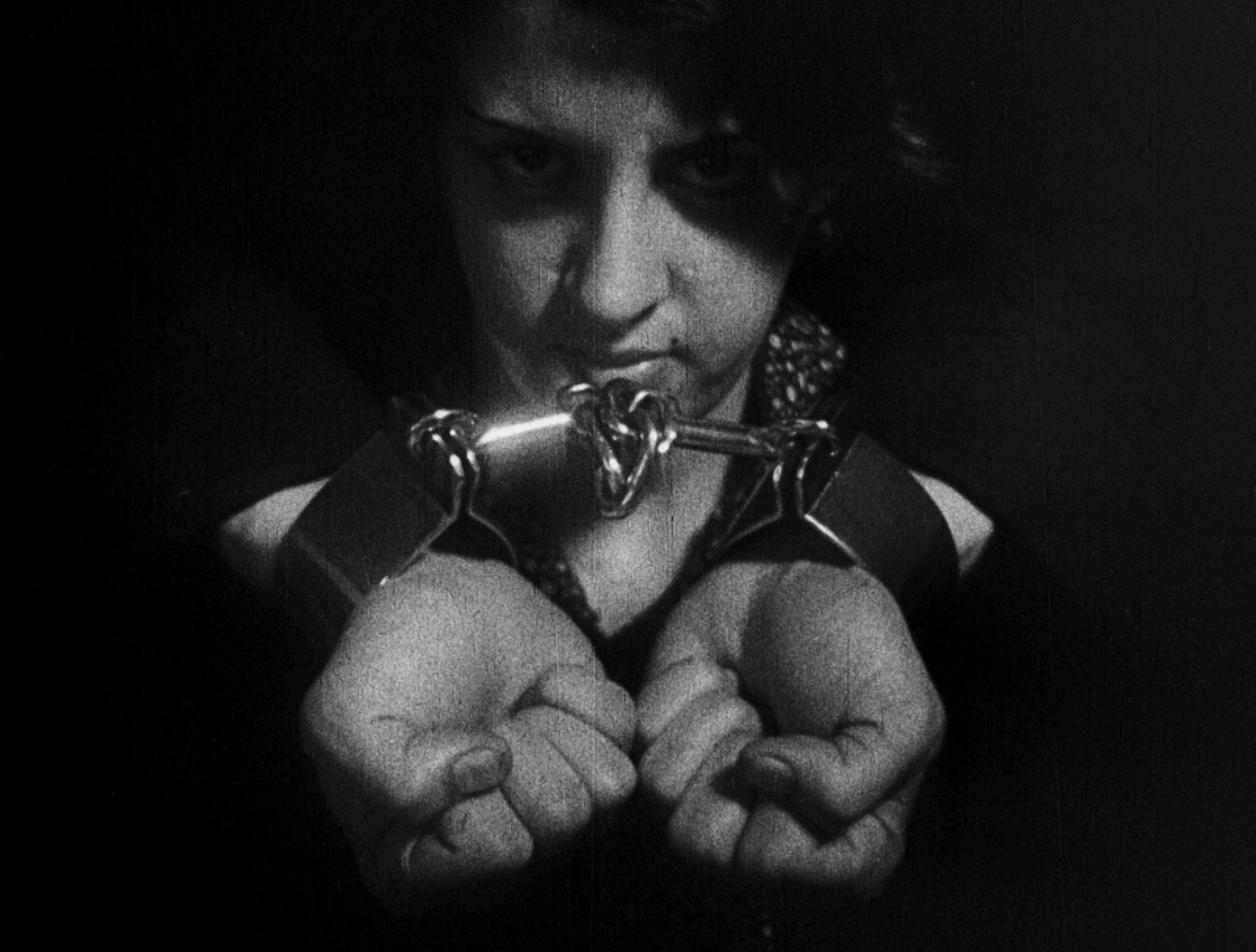
The image of handcuffs in Limite is a recreation of a photograph by André Kertész.

In August 1929, Peixoto was in Paris, on a summer break from his studies in England, when he saw a photograph by André Kertész of two handcuffed male hands around the neck of a woman who is gazing at the camera. This became the "generative" or "Protean" image for Limite. The film's unusual structure has kept the film in the margins of most film histories, where it has been known mainly as a provocative and legendary cult film.

== Cast ==
- Olga Breno as Woman #1
- Taciana Rey as Woman #2
- Raul Schnoor as Man #1
- Brutus Pedreira as Man #2
- Carmen Santos as Woman eating a fruit
- Mário Peixoto as Man sitting at the cemetery
- Edgar Brasil as Man asleep in the theater
- Iolanda Bernardes as Woman at the sewing machine

== Production ==
Peixoto wanted to play the male lead himself, and pitched the film to Brazilian directors Humberto Mauro and Adhemar Gonzaga, both of whom said that Peixoto's scenario was too personal to be directed by anyone else. Peixoto decided to proceed and paid for the production using family funds. He filmed in 1930 on the coast of Mangaratiba, a village about 50 miles from Rio de Janeiro, where his cousin owned a farm. Stylistically, Limite follows a number of great 1920s directors. In his article on the film, critic Fábio Andrade notes the influence of D. W. Griffith, Soviet montage, the German expressionist works of F. W. Murnau and Robert Wiene, French Surrealist shorts by Germaine Dulac and Man Ray, Robert J. Flaherty, Carl Theodor Dreyer and particularly Jean Epstein, all of which are visible in German-born Edgar Brasil's cinematography.

One scene takes place at a screening of The Adventurer by Charlie Chaplin, suggesting another important influence on Peixoto's film.

Mário Peixoto said that Limite cost 60,000 reis.

== Reception ==
Limite had three public screenings in Rio de Janeiro between May 1931 and January 1932, receiving little public support or critical acclaim. Its reputation built slowly: Vinicius de Moraes, who later became a prominent Brazilian poet and lyricist, showed the film to Orson Welles when he visited Brazil in 1942 to film parts of It's All True. Other screenings took place in private film societies, alongside works by Sergei Eisenstein and Vsevolod Pudovkin, during the 1940s and early 1950s.

Peixoto died in 1992, aged 83, leaving a substantial body of literary work, unproduced screenplays and scenarios, and a fragment of a planned second feature film, Onde a Terra Acaba, which never was completed and mostly lost in a fire.

Peixoto continued to promote Limite throughout his life. In 1965, he publicized an article about the film, supposedly written by Eisenstein, praising its "luminous pain, which unfolds as rhythm, coordinated to images of rare precision and ingenuity." Peixoto was vague about the article's provenance, which lacked primary sources, claiming first that it appeared in Tatler and then an unidentified German magazine and finally admitted that he had written it himself.

In 1988, the Cinemateca Brasileira named Limite the best Brazilian film of all time. In 1995 a national survey of critics by Folha de S.Paulo named it the best Brazilian film. In 2015, it was voted number 1 on the Abraccine Top 100 Brazilian films list.

== Preservation status ==
By 1959, the single nitrate print of Limite had deteriorated due to poor storage conditions and could no longer be screened, a situation that contributed to its near-mythical status in Brazilian film history. It was stored at the Faculdade Nacional de Filosofia (FNF) until 1966 when the military dictatorship's police force confiscated it, along with works by Eisenstein, Pudovkin and other Soviet directors. Former FNF student Pereira de Mello managed to retrieve the print later that year. The restoration process then began with photographic reproductions of every single frame, which was completed in 1978. The most recent version, based on that restoration, was made with the assistance of the Mário Peixoto Archives and Cinemateca Brasileira. It had its American premiere at the Brooklyn Academy of Music in Brooklyn, New York on 17 November 2010, as part of the World Cinema Foundation's Film Festival. One scene of the film remains missing and was replaced by an intertitle.

In 2017, the Criterion Collection issued Limite on DVD and Blu-Ray, as one of Martin Scorsese's selections for his World Cinema Project.

== See also ==
- List of rediscovered films
