= Robert Boudrioz =

French screenwriter and film director

Robert Pierre Frédéric Boudrioz (12 February 1887 – 22 June 1949) was a French screenwriter and film director.

Boudrioz was born in Versailles and died in Paris.

== Selected filmography ==
Director

- L'âtre (1919)
- Tom Thumb (1920)
- Tillers of the Soil (1923)
- La Chaussée des géants (1925)
- Holiday (1931)
- English As It Is Spoken (1931)
- Vacances (1933)
- Le grillon du foyer (1933)
- The Man with a Broken Ear (1934)

== Bibliography ==
- Oscherwitz, Dayna & Higgins, MaryEllen. The A to Z of French Cinema. Scarecrow Press, 2009.
- Powrie, Phil & Rebillard, Éric. Pierre Batcheff and stardom in 1920s French cinema. Edinburgh University Press, 2009
