= List of French films of 1935 =

French films released in 1935

A list of films produced in France in 1935:

== A-L ==
Title	Director	Cast	Genre	Notes
Adémaï in the Middle Ages	Jean de Marguenat	Noël-Noël, Michel Simon, Suzy Vernon	Comedy	
Baccara	Yves Mirande	Marcelle Chantal, Lucien Baroux, Jules Berry	Comedy	
Beautiful Days	Marc Allégret	Simone Simon, Jean-Pierre Aumont, Raymond Rouleau	Comedy	
Bourrasque	Pierre Billon	Germaine Rouer, Jacques Grétillat, Jean Servais	Drama	
Bux the Clown	Jacques Natanson	Henri Rollan, Pierre Larquey, Suzy Vernon	Drama	
Carnival in Flanders	Jacques Feyder	Françoise Rosay, Jean Murat, Louis Jouvet	Comedy-drama	
The Coquelet Affair	Jean Gourguet	Marcel Lévesque, Alice Tissot, Paul Pauley	Comedy	
Count Obligado	Léon Mathot	Georges Milton, Germaine Aussey, Edith Méra	Comedy	
The Crew	Anatole Litvak	Annabella, Charles Vanel, Jean Murat	Drama	
Crime and Punishment	Pierre Chenal	Harry Baur, Pierre Blanchar, Madeleine Ozeray	Crime	
Dark Eyes	Viktor Tourjansky	Harry Baur, Simone Simon, Jean-Pierre Aumont	Drama	
Dédé	René Guissart	Danielle Darrieux, Albert Préjean, Mireille Perrey	Comedy	
The Devil in the Bottle	Heinz Hilpert, Raoul Ploquin	Käthe von Nagy, Pierre Blanchar, Gina Manès	Drama	Co-production with Germany
Divine	Max Ophüls	Simone Berriau, George Rigaud, Gina Manès	Drama	
Dora Nelson	René Guissart	Elvire Popesco, André Lefaur, Micheline Cheirel	Comedy	
Fanfare of Love	Richard Pottier	Fernand Gravey, Betty Stockfeld, Julien Carette	Comedy	
Ferdinand the Roisterer	René Sti	Fernandel, Paulette Dubost, André Alerme	Comedy	
Gaspard de Besse	André Hugon	Raimu, Antonin Berval, Jacqueline Laurent	Historical	
Golgotha	Julien Duvivier	Harry Baur, Robert Le Vigan, Jean Gabin	Biblical drama	
Good Luck	Sacha Guitry, Fernand Rivers	Sacha Guitry, Jacqueline Delubac, Pauline Carton	Comedy	
The Green Domino	Henri Decoin, Herbert Selpin	Danielle Darrieux, Charles Vanel, Maurice Escande	Drama	
Happy Arenas	Karl Anton	Lucien Baroux, Betty Stockfeld, André Alerme	Musical	
His Excellency Antonin	Charles-Félix Tavano	Raymond Cordy, Josette Day, Robert Pizani	Comedy	
Honeymoon	Pierre-Jean Ducis	Albert Préjean, Janine Merrey, Félix Oudart	Comedy	
The Hortensia Sisters	René Guissart	Meg Lemonnier, Lucien Baroux, Julien Carette	Musical	
The Imberger Mystery	Jacques Séverac	Camille Bert, Simone Deguyse, Jean Galland	Mystery	
Juanita	Pierre Caron	Mireille Perrey, Alfred Rode, André Berley	Musical comedy	
Justin de Marseille	Maurice Tourneur	Antonin Berval, Pierre Larquey, Alexandre Rignault	Crime	
King of the Camargue	Jacques de Baroncelli	Antonin Berval, Simone Bourday, Charles Vanel	Drama	
Koenigsmark	Maurice Tourneur	Pierre Fresnay, Elissa Landi, John Lodge	Drama	Co-production with the United Kingdom
La Bandera	Julien Duvivier	Annabella, Jean Gabin, Robert Le Vigan	Drama	
Light Cavalry	Werner Hochbaum, Roger Vitrac	Mona Goya, Gabriel Gabrio, Constant Rémy	Musical	Co-production with Germany
Little One	Henry Wulschleger	Bach, Pierre Brasseur, Janine Merrey	Comedy	
Lovers and Thieves	Raymond Bernard	Michel Simon, Pierre Blanchar, Florelle	Comedy	
Lucrezia Borgia	Abel Gance	Edwige Feuillère, Gabriel Gabrio, Maurice Escande	Historical	

== M-Z ==
Title	Director	Cast	Genre	Notes
Madame Angot's Daughter	Jean Bernard-Derosne	André Baugé, Jean Aquistapace, Raymond Cordy	Comedy	
Mademoiselle Mozart	Yvan Noé	Danielle Darrieux, Pierre Mingand, Christiane Dor	Comedy	
The Man with a Broken Ear	Robert Boudrioz	Thomy Bourdelle, Alice Tissot, Jacqueline Daix	Drama	
The Mascot	Léon Mathot	Lucien Baroux, Germaine Roger, Thérèse Dorny	Musical	
Merchant of Love	Edmond T. Gréville	Jean Galland, Rosine Deréan, Françoise Rosay	Comedy	
Merlusse	Marcel Pagnol	Henri Poupon, Annie Toinon, Rellys	Comedy	
Monsieur Sans-Gêne	Karl Anton	Fernand Gravey, Josseline Gaël, Thérèse Dorny	Romantic comedy	
Moses and Solomon, Perfumers	André Hugon	Léon Belières, Charles Lamy, Meg Lemonnier	Comedy	
Motherhood	Jean Choux	Françoise Rosay, Félix Oudart, Thérèse Reignier	Drama	
The Mysteries of Paris	Félix Gandéra	Lucien Baroux, Madeleine Ozeray, Marcelle Géniat	Drama	
The Orderly	Victor Tourjansky	Marcelle Chantal, Jean Worms, Fernandel	Drama	
Paris Camargue	Jack Forrester	Max Dearly, Albert Préjean, Monique Rolland	Comedy	
Pasteur	Sacha Guitry, Fernand Rivers	Sacha Guitry, Maurice Schutz, Gaston Dubosc	Drama	
The Pont-Biquet Family	Christian-Jaque	Gina Manès, Armand Bernard, Paul Pauley	Comedy	
Princess Tam Tam	Edmond T. Gréville	Josephine Baker, Albert Préjean, Robert Arnoux	Musical romance	
Quelle drôle de gosse!	Léo Joannon	Albert Préjean, Danielle Darrieux	Comedy	
A Rare Bird	Richard Pottier	Pierre Brasseur, Max Dearly, Monique Rolland	Comedy	
Return to Paradise	Serge de Poligny	Claude Dauphin, Marcel André, Viviane Romance	Drama	
The Scandalous Couple	Georges Lacombe	Suzy Vernon, René Lefèvre, Jeanne Aubert	Comedy	
School for Coquettes	Pierre Colombier	Raimu, Renée Saint-Cyr, André Lefaur	Comedy	
Second Bureau	Pierre Billon	Jean Murat, Véra Korène, Janine Crispin	Spy	
The Slipper Episode	Jean de Limur	Betty Stockfeld, Roger Tréville, Claude Dauphin	Comedy	
Speak to Me of Love	René Guissart	Roger Tréville, Germaine Aussey	Comedy	
The Squadron's Baby	René Sti	Michel Simon, Paulette Dubost, Suzy Prim	Comedy	
Thirteen Days of Love	Louis Valray	Colette Darfeuil, Samson Fainsilber, Simone Renant	Drama	
Toni	Jean Renoir	Celia Montalván, Jenny Hélia	Drama	
Tovaritch	Jean Tarride	Irén Zilahy, André Lefaur, Pierre Renoir	Comedy	
Vertigo	Paul Schiller	Alice Field, André Burgère, Jean Toulout	Drama	
Wedding Night	Maurice Kéroul, Georges Monca	Armand Bernard, Florelle, Robert Arnoux	Comedy	
Whirlpool of Desire	Edmond T. Gréville	Jeanne Boitel, Jean Galland	Drama	

== See also ==
- 1935 in France
