= 1935 in film =

The following is an overview of 1935 in film, including significant events, a list of films released and notable births and deaths. The cinema releases of 1935 were highly representative of the early Golden Age period of Hollywood. Clark Gable, Shirley Temple, Fred Astaire and Ginger Rogers were among the top Hollywood stars, and Jeanette MacDonald was teamed with Nelson Eddy for the first time. A significant number of productions also originated in the UK film industry.

== Events ==
- February 22 – The Little Colonel premieres starring Shirley Temple, Lionel Barrymore and Bill Robinson, featuring a famous stair dance with Hollywood's first interracial dance couple
- February 23 – Gene Autry stars as himself as the Singing Cowboy in the serial The Phantom Empire. He would later be voted the number one Western star from 1937 to 1942.
- February 27 – Seven-year-old Shirley Temple wins the first special Academy Juvenile Award.
- March
  - The Bantu Educational Kinema Experiment is started in order to educate the Bantu peoples.
  - The Moscow International Film Festival is held for the first time. The jury is chaired by Sergei Eisenstein, and first prize is awarded to The Youth of Maxim
- May 31 – Fox Film and Twentieth Century Pictures merge to form 20th Century Fox.
- June 13 – Following the merger of six smaller independent film companies including Monogram Pictures, Mascot Pictures, Liberty Pictures and Majestic Pictures, Herbert J. Yates completed the formation of Republic Pictures.
- August 15 – Will Rogers who the previous year was voted the Top Money Making Star dies in a plane crash.
- August 25 – William Boyd appears in his first of 66 films as Hopalong Cassidy in Hop-Along Cassidy.
- September – Judy Garland signs a contract with Metro-Goldwyn-Mayer (MGM).
- September 5 – Gene Autry appears in his first film for the newly formed Republic Pictures – Tumbling Tumbleweeds, named after his second million-selling record.
- October 12 – Studio Misr is founded in Egypt, sponsored by the country's first national bank.
- November 30 – The British-made film Scrooge, the first all-talking film version of Charles Dickens' novel A Christmas Carol, opens in the U.S. after its U.K. release on November 26. Seymour Hicks plays Ebenezer Scrooge, a role he has played onstage hundreds of times. The film is criticized by some for not showing all of the ghosts physically, and quickly fades into obscurity. Widespread interest does not surface until the film is shown on television in the 1980s, in very shabby-looking prints. It is eventually restored on DVD.

== Academy Awards ==
The 8th Academy Awards were held on March 5, 1936, at the Biltmore Hotel in Los Angeles, California. They were hosted by Frank Capra. This was the first year in which the gold statuettes were called "Oscars".

Most nominations: Mutiny on the Bounty (MGM) – 8

Major Awards

- Best Picture: Mutiny on the Bounty – Metro-Goldwyn-Mayer
- Best Director: John Ford – The Informer
- Best Actor: Victor McLaglen – The Informer
- Best Actress: Bette Davis – Dangerous

Most Awards: The Informer (RKO) – 4 (Actor, Director, Adaptation, Scoring)

== Top-grossing films (U.S.) ==
The top ten 1935 released films by box office gross in North America are as follows:

Highest-grossing films of 1935
| Rank | Title | Distributor | Domestic rentals |
|---|---|---|---|
| 1 | Mutiny on the Bounty | MGM | $2,250,000 |
| 2 | Top Hat | RKO | $1,782,000 |
| 3 | China Seas | MGM | $1,710,000 |
| 4 | Broadway Melody of 1936 | MGM | $1,655,000 |
| 5 | David Copperfield | MGM | $1,621,000 |
| 6 | Steamboat Round the Bend | 20th Century Fox | $1,528,000 |
| 7 | The Crusades | Paramount | $1,491,471 |
| 8 | Roberta | RKO | $1,467,000 |
| 9 | In Old Kentucky | 20th Century Fox | $1,438,000 |
| 10 | The Littlest Rebel | 20th Century Fox | $1,431,000 |

== Top Ten Money Making Stars ==
Exhibitors selected the following as the Top Ten Money Making Stars of the Year in Quigley Publishing Company's annual poll.

| Rank | Actor/Actress |
|---|---|
| 1. | Shirley Temple |
| 2. | Will Rogers |
| 3. | Clark Gable |
| 4. | Fred Astaire and Ginger Rogers |
| 5. | Joan Crawford |
| 6. | Claudette Colbert |
| 7. | Dick Powell |
| 8. | Wallace Beery |
| 9. | Joe E. Brown |
| 10. | James Cagney |

== Notable films ==
See also: United States unless stated.

=== 0–9 ===
- The 39 Steps, directed by Alfred Hitchcock, starring Robert Donat and Madeleine Carroll – (GB)

=== A ===
- After Office Hours, directed by Robert Z. Leonard, starring Clark Gable and Constance Bennett
- Ah, Wilderness!, directed by Clarence Brown, starring Wallace Beery and Lionel Barrymore
- Alice Adams, directed by George Stevens, starring Katharine Hepburn and Fred MacMurray
- Amphitryon, directed by Reinhold Schünzel, starring Willy Fritsch – (Germany)
- Anna Karenina, directed by Clarence Brown, starring Greta Garbo and Fredric March
- Annie Oakley, directed by George Stevens, starring Barbara Stanwyck and Melvyn Douglas
- The Arizonian, directed by Charles Vidor, starring Richard Dix

=== B ===
- La Bandera, directed by Julien Duvivier and starring Annabella and Jean Gabin – (France)
- Barbary Coast, directed by Howard Hawks, starring Miriam Hopkins, Edward G. Robinson and Joel McCrea
- Becky Sharp, directed by Rouben Mamoulian, starring Miriam Hopkins, Cedric Hardwicke and Billie Burke
- Black Fury, directed by Michael Curtiz, starring Paul Muni
- The Black Room, directed by Roy William Neill, starring Boris Karloff
- Bordertown, directed by Archie Mayo, starring Paul Muni and Bette Davis
- Boys Will Be Boys, directed by William Beaudine, starring Will Hay – (GB)
- Brewster's Millions, directed by Thornton Freeland, starring Jack Buchanan and Lili Damita – (GB)
- The Bride Comes Home, directed by Wesley Ruggles, starring Claudette Colbert, Fred MacMurray and Robert Young
- Bride of Frankenstein, directed by James Whale, starring Boris Karloff and Elsa Lanchester
- Broadway Melody of 1936, directed by Roy Del Ruth, starring Jack Benny, Eleanor Powell, Robert Taylor and Una Merkel

=== C ===
- The Call of the Wild, directed by William A. Wellman, starring Clark Gable, Loretta Young and Jack Oakie
- Captain Blood, directed by Michael Curtiz, starring Errol Flynn, Olivia de Havilland and Basil Rathbone
- Car of Dreams, directed by Graham Cutts and Austin Melford, starring Grete Mosheim and John Mills – (GB)
- Carnival in Flanders (La Kermesse héroïque), directed by Jacques Feyder, starring Françoise Rosay – (France)
- Charlie Chan in Egypt, directed by Louis King, starring Warner Oland
- Children of Troubled Times (Fēngyún Érnǚ), directed by Xu Xingzhi, starring Yuan Muzhi and Wang Renmei – (China)
- China Seas, directed by Tay Garnett, starring Clark Gable, Jean Harlow, Wallace Beery, Lewis Stone and Rosalind Russell
- The Clairvoyant, directed by Maurice Elvey, starring Claude Rains and Fay Wray – (GB)
- Coal Face, documentary directed by Alberto Cavalcanti – (GB)
- Crime and Punishment, directed by Josef von Sternberg, starring Edward Arnold and Peter Lorre
- The Crime of Dr. Crespi, directed by John H. Auer, starring Erich von Stroheim
- The Crusades, directed by Cecil B. DeMille, starring Loretta Young and Henry Wilcoxon
- Curly Top, directed by Irving Cummings, starring Shirley Temple and John Boles

=== D ===
- Dandy Dick, directed by William Beaudine, starring Will Hay – (GB)
- Dangerous, directed by Alfred E. Green, starring Bette Davis and Franchot Tone
- Dante's Inferno, directed by Harry Lachman, starring Spencer Tracy and Claire Trevor
- The Dark Angel, directed by Sidney Franklin, starring Fredric March, Merle Oberon and Herbert Marshall
- David Copperfield, directed by George Cukor, starring W. C. Fields, Lionel Barrymore, Maureen O'Sullivan, Lewis Stone and Freddie Bartholomew
- Death Drives Through, directed by Edward L. Cahn – (GB)
- Devdas, directed by and starring Pramathesh Barua – (India)
- The Devil Is a Woman, directed by Josef von Sternberg, starring Marlene Dietrich and Cesar Romero
- Dinky, directed by D. Ross Lederman and Howard Bretherton, starring Jackie Cooper and Mary Astor
- Doubting Thomas, directed by David Butler, starring Will Rogers and Billie Burke
- Drake of England, directed by Arthur B. Woods, starring Matheson Lang – (GB)

=== E-F ===
- The Eleventh Commandment (Jedenácté přikázání), directed by Martin Frič – (Czechoslovakia)
- Escapade, directed by Robert Z. Leonard, starring William Powell and Luise Rainer
- Escape Me Never, directed by Paul Czinner, starring Elisabeth Bergner – (GB)
- Every Night at Eight, directed by Raoul Walsh, starring George Raft and Alice Faye
- The Farmer Takes a Wife, directed by Victor Fleming, starring Janet Gaynor and Henry Fonda
- Foreign Affaires, directed by and starring Tom Walls – (GB)
- Four Hours to Kill!, directed by Mitchell Leisen, starring Richard Barthelmess
- Frisco Kid, directed by Lloyd Bacon, starring James Cagney, Margaret Lindsay and Ricardo Cortez
- Front Page Woman, directed by Michael Curtiz, starring Bette Davis and George Brent

=== G ===
- G Men, directed by William Keighley, starring James Cagney, Ann Dvorak and Margaret Lindsay
- The Ghost Goes West, directed by René Clair, starring Robert Donat, Jean Parker and Eugene Pallette – (GB)
- The Gilded Lily, directed by Wesley Ruggles, starring Claudette Colbert, Fred MacMurray and Ray Milland
- The Girl from 10th Avenue, directed by Alfred E. Green, starring Bette Davis
- The Glass Key, directed by Frank Tuttle, starring George Raft and Edward Arnold
- Go Into Your Dance, directed by Archie Mayo, starring Al Jolson, Ruby Keeler and Glenda Farrell
- Goin' to Town, directed by Alexander Hall, starring Mae West
- Gold Diggers of 1935, directed by Busby Berkeley, starring Dick Powell, Adolphe Menjou, Gloria Stuart and Glenda Farrell
- The Good Fairy, directed by William Wyler, starring Margaret Sullavan, Herbert Marshall and Frank Morgan
- The Great Impersonation, directed by Alan Crosland, starring Edmund Lowe

=== H ===
- Hands Across the Table, directed by Mitchell Leisen, starring Carole Lombard and Fred MacMurray
- Harmony Lane, directed by Joseph Santley, starring Douglass Montgomery
- Home on the Range, directed by Arthur Jacobson, starring Jackie Coogan and Randolph Scott
- Hop-Along Cassidy, directed by Howard Bretherton, starring William Boyd
- Hyde Park Corner, directed by Sinclair Hill, starring Gordon Harker – (GB)

=== I-J ===
- I Live My Life, directed by W. S. Van Dyke, starring Joan Crawford and Frank Morgan
- I'll Give a Million (Darò un milione), directed by Mario Camerini, starring Vittorio De Sica – (Italy)
- In Old Kentucky, directed by George Marshall, starring Will Rogers
- The Informer, directed by John Ford, starring Victor McLaglen
- An Inn in Tokyo (Tōkyō no yado), directed by Yasujirō Ozu – (Japan)
- Jánošík, directed by Martin Frič – (Czechoslovakia)

=== L ===
- The Last Days of Pompeii, directed by Merian C. Cooper and Ernest B. Schoedsack, starring Preston Foster and Basil Rathbone
- Life Begins at 40, directed by George Marshall, starring Will Rogers
- Little Big Shot, directed by Michael Curtiz, starring Glenda Farrell
- The Little Colonel, directed by David Butler, starring Shirley Temple and Lionel Barrymore
- Little Mother (Kleine Mutti), directed by Henry Koster, starring Franciska Gaal – (Austria/Hungary)
- The Littlest Rebel, directed by David Butler, starring Shirley Temple
- The Lives of a Bengal Lancer, directed by Henry Hathaway, starring Gary Cooper and Franchot Tone
- Long Live with Dearly Departed (Ať žije nebožtík), directed by Martin Frič – (Czechoslovakia)
- Lucrezia Borgia (Lucrèce Borgia), directed by Abel Gance, starring Edwige Feuillère – (France)

=== M ===
- Mad Love (aka The Hands of Orlac), directed by Karl Freund, starring Peter Lorre
- Magnificent Obsession, directed by John M. Stahl, starring Irene Dunne and Robert Taylor
- Man of the Moment, directed by Monty Banks, starring Douglas Fairbanks Jr. – (GB)
- Man on the Flying Trapeze, directed by Clyde Bruckman, starring W. C. Fields
- The Man Who Broke the Bank at Monte Carlo, directed by Stephen Roberts, starring Ronald Colman and Joan Bennett
- Men of Action, directed by Alan James, starring Frankie Darro
- Midshipman Easy, directed by Carol Reed, starring Hughie Green and Margaret Lockwood – (GB)
- A Midsummer Night's Dream, directed by Max Reinhardt and William Dieterle, starring James Cagney, Joe E. Brown, Dick Powell and Olivia de Havilland
- The Million Ryo Pot (Tange Sazen Yowa: Hyakuman Ryō no Tsubo), directed by Sadao Yamanaka – (Japan)
- Les Misérables, directed by Richard Boleslawski, starring Fredric March, Charles Laughton and Cedric Hardwicke
- Mississippi, directed by A. Edward Sutherland, starring Bing Crosby, W. C. Fields and Joan Bennett
- Moscow Nights, directed by Anthony Asquith, starring Laurence Olivier – (GB)
- The Murder Man, directed by Tim Whelan, starring Spencer Tracy and Virginia Bruce
- Music Hath Charms, directed by Thomas Bentley, starring Henry Hall – (GB)
- Mutiny on the Bounty, directed by Frank Lloyd, starring Charles Laughton, Clark Gable and Franchot Tone
- The Mystery of Edwin Drood, directed by Stuart Walker, starring Claude Rains

=== N ===
- Naughty Marietta, directed by Robert Z. Leonard and W. S. Van Dyke, starring Jeanette MacDonald, Nelson Eddy and Frank Morgan
- The New Gulliver (Novyy Gullivyer), directed by Aleksandr Ptushko – (USSR)
- New Women (Xīn nǚxìng), directed by Cai Chusheng, starring Ruan Lingyu – (China)
- A Night at the Opera, directed by Sam Wood, starring the Marx Brothers
- The Night Is Young, directed by Dudley Murphy, starring Ramon Novarro and Evelyn Laye
- No Limit, directed by Monty Banks, starring George Formby – (GB)
- No More Ladies, directed by Edward H. Griffith, starring Joan Crawford, Robert Montgomery and Franchot Tone

=== O-P ===
- The Old and the Young King (Der alte und der junge König), directed by Hans Steinhoff, starring Emil Jannings – (Germany)
- Our Little Girl, directed by John S. Robertson, starring Shirley Temple, Joel McCrea and Lyle Talbot
- Page Miss Glory, directed by Mervyn LeRoy, starring Marion Davies, Pat O'Brien, Dick Powell and Mary Astor
- Party Wire, directed by Erle C. Kenton, starring Jean Arthur and Victor Jory
- The Passing of the Third Floor Back, directed by Berthold Viertel, starring Conrad Veidt – (GB)
- Peter Ibbetson, directed by Henry Hathaway, starring Gary Cooper, Ann Harding and Ida Lupino
- Police Chief Antek (Antek policmajster), directed by Michał Waszyński, starring Adolf Dymsza – (Poland)
- Princess Tam Tam, directed by Edmond T. Gréville, starring Josephine Baker – (France)
- Private Worlds, directed by Gregory La Cava, starring Claudette Colbert, Charles Boyer, Joan Bennett and Joel McCrea
- Professional Soldier, directed by Tay Garnett, starring Victor McLaglen, Freddie Bartholomew and Gloria Stuart
- Public Hero No. 1, directed by J. Walter Ruben, starring Lionel Barrymore, Jean Arthur and Chester Morris

=== R ===
- The Raven, directed by Lew Landers, starring Boris Karloff and Béla Lugosi
- Reckless, directed by Victor Fleming, starring Jean Harlow, William Powell and Franchot Tone
- Red Passport (Passaporto rosso), directed by Guido Brignone, starring Isa Miranda – (Italy)
- Remember Last Night?, directed by James Whale, starring Edward Arnold, Constance Cummings and Robert Young
- Rendezvous, directed by William K. Howard, starring William Powell, Rosalind Russell and Cesar Romero
- Roberta, directed by William A. Seiter, starring Irene Dunne, Fred Astaire, Ginger Rogers and Randolph Scott
- Royal Cavalcade, directed by Thomas Bentley, Herbert Brenon, W. P. Kellino, Norman Lee, Walter Summers and Marcel Varnel – (GB)
- Ruggles of Red Gap, directed by Leo McCarey, starring Charles Laughton and ZaSu Pitts

=== S ===
- The Scoundrel, directed by Ben Hecht and Charles MacArthur, starring Noël Coward
- Scrooge, directed by Henry Edwards, starring Seymour Hicks – (GB)
- Shanghai, directed by James Flood, starring Loretta Young, Charles Boyer and Warner Oland
- She, directed by Lansing C. Holden and Irving Pichel, starring Helen Gahagan, Randolph Scott and Nigel Bruce
- She Couldn't Take It, directed by Tay Garnett, starring George Raft and Joan Bennett
- She Married Her Boss, directed by Gregory La Cava, starring Claudette Colbert and Melvyn Douglas
- Sheela (Pind Di Kurhi), directed by K.D. Mehra, starring Noor Jehan – (India)
- The Silent Code, directed by Stuart Paton, starring Kane Richmond
- So Red the Rose, directed by King Vidor, starring Margaret Sullavan and Randolph Scott
- The Soul of the Accordion (El alma de bandoneón), directed by Mario Soffici, starring Libertad Lamarque – (Argentina)
- Special Agent, directed by William Keighley, starring Bette Davis, George Brent and Ricardo Cortez
- Splendor, directed by Elliott Nugent, starring Miriam Hopkins and Joel McCrea
- Squibs, directed by Henry Edwards, starring Betty Balfour, Gordon Harker and Stanley Holloway – (GB)
- Star of Midnight, directed by Stephen Roberts (director), starring William Powell and Ginger Rogers
- Steamboat Round the Bend, directed by John Ford, starring Will Rogers

=== T ===
- A Tale of Two Cities, directed by Jack Conway, starring Ronald Colman and Elizabeth Allan
- Thanks a Million, directed by Roy Del Ruth, starring Dick Powell and Ann Dvorak
- Toni, directed by Jean Renoir – (France)
- Top Hat, directed by Mark Sandrich, starring Fred Astaire and Ginger Rogers
- Transatlantic Tunnel, directed by Maurice Elvey, starring Richard Dix and Leslie Banks – (GB)
- The Triumph of Sherlock Holmes, directed by Leslie S. Hiscott, starring Arthur Wontner and Ian Fleming – (GB)
- Triumph of the Will, Nazi propaganda film directed by Leni Riefenstahl – (Germany)
- Tumbling Tumbleweeds, directed by Joseph Kane, starring Gene Autry
- Turn of the Tide, directed by Norman Walker, starring John Garrick and Geraldine Fitzgerald – (GB)

=== V-Y ===
- Villa for Sale (Ez a villa eladó), directed by Géza von Cziffra – (Hungary)
- The Village Squire, directed by Reginald Denham, starring David Horne and Vivien Leigh – (GB)
- Waterfront Lady, directed by Joseph Santley, starring Ann Rutherford
- The Wedding Night, directed by King Vidor, starring Gary Cooper and Anna Sten
- Werewolf of London, directed by Stuart Walker, starring Henry Hull and Warner Oland
- Westward Ho, directed by Robert N. Bradbury, starring John Wayne
- The Whole Town's Talking, directed by John Ford, starring Edward G. Robinson and Jean Arthur
- Way Down East, directed by Henry King, starring Rochelle Hudson and Henry Fonda
- The Youth of Maxim (Yunost Maksima), directed by Grigori Kozintsev and Leonid Trauberg, starring Boris Chirkov – (USSR)

== 1935 film releases ==
United States unless stated.

=== January–March ===
- January 1935
  - 11 January
    - The Lives of a Bengal Lancer
    - The Night Is Young
  - 18 January
    - David Copperfield
  - 23 January
    - Bordertown
  - 25 January
    - The Gilded Lily
  - 27 January
    - The Youth of Maxim (USSR)
  - 31 January
    - The Good Fairy
    - The Triumph of Sherlock Holmes
- February 1935
  - 1 February
    - Home on the Range
  - 2 February
    - New Women (China)
  - 4 February
    - The Mystery of Edwin Drood
  - 8 February
    - Long Live with Dearly Departed (Czechoslovakia)
  - 11 February
    - Police Chief Antek (Poland)
  - 19 February
    - Ruggles of Red Gap
  - 22 February
    - After Office Hours
    - Death Drives Through
    - The Little Colonel
    - Toni (France)
    - The Whole Town's Talking
- March 1935
  - 8 March
    - Naughty Marietta
    - Roberta
    - The Wedding Night
  - 16 March
    - Gold Diggers of 1935
  - 22 March
    - Life Begins at 40
    - Mississippi
  - 25 March
    - The New Gulliver (U.S.S.R.)
  - 28 March
    - Triumph of the Will (Germany)
  - 30 March
    - Devdas

=== April–June ===
- April 1935
  - 5 April
    - Brewster's Millions
  - 10 April
    - Villa for Sale
  - 11 April
    - Four Hours to Kill!
  - 18 April
    - G Men
  - 19 April
    - Private Worlds
    - Reckless
    - Star of Midnight
  - 20 April
    - Go Into Your Dance
    - Little Mother (Austria/Hungary)
    - Les Misérables
  - 22 April
    - Bride of Frankenstein
  - 25 April
    - Goin' to Town
  - 27 April
    - Party Wire
  - 30 April
    - The Scoundrel
- May 1935
  - 9 May
    - The Informer
  - 11 May
    - Dinky
  - 13 May
    - Werewolf of London
  - 16 May
    - Drake of England (GB)
  - 18 May
    - Black Fury
  - 26 May
    - The Girl from 10th Avenue
  - 31 May
    - Public Hero No. 1
- June 1935
  - 6 June
    - The 39 Steps (GB)
  - 7 June
    - Doubting Thomas
    - Our Little Girl
  - 13 June
    - Becky Sharp
  - 15 June
    - The Glass Key
    - The Million Ryo Pot (Japan)
  - 28 June
    - The Arizonian

=== July–September ===
- July 1935
  - 6 July
    - Escapade
  - 8 July
    - The Raven
  - 12 July
    - Mad Love
    - The Murder Man
    - She
  - 15 July
    - The Black Room
    - The Clairvoyant (GB)
  - 18 July
    - Amphitryon (Germany)
  - 19 July
    - Shanghai
  - 20 July
    - Front Page Woman
  - 26 July
    - Curly Top
  - 31 July
    - Dante's Inferno
- August 1935
  - 2 August
    - The Farmer Takes a Wife
  - 3 August
    - Man on the Flying Trapeze
  - 9 August
    - The Call of the Wild
    - China Seas
  - 15 August
    - Alice Adams
  - 19 August
    - Westward Ho
  - 25 August
    - Hop-Along Cassidy
  - 29 August
    - Top Hat
  - 30 August
    - Anna Karenina
- September 1935
  - 5 September
    - Tumbling Tumbleweeds
  - 6 September
    - Steamboat Round the Bend
  - 7 September
    - Little Big Shot
    - Page Miss Glory
  - 8 September
    - The Dark Angel
  - 9 September
    - Harmony Lane
  - 14 September
    - Special Agent
  - 19 September
    - She Married Her Boss
  - 20 September
    - Broadway Melody of 1936
  - 24 September
    - The Crime of Dr. Crespi
  - 25 September
    - La Bandera (France)

=== October–December ===
- October 1935
  - 4 October
    - I Live My Life
  - 5 October
    - Waterfront Lady
  - 8 October
    - She Couldn't Take It
  - 13 October
    - Barbary Coast
  - 16 October
    - Way Down East
  - 18 October
    - Hands Across the Table
    - The Last Days of Pompeii
  - 24 October
    - Rendezvous
  - 25 October
    - The Crusades
    - Thanks a Million
  - 27 October
    - Trans-atlantic Tunnel (GB)
  - 28 October
    - No Limit (GB)
  - 30 October
    - A Midsummer Night's Dream
  - 31 October
    - Peter Ibbetson
- November 1935
  - 2 November
    - Princess Tam Tam (France)
  - 4 November
    - Remember Last Night?
  - 8 November
    - Mutiny on the Bounty
  - 14 November
    - The Man Who Broke the Bank at Monte Carlo
  - 15 November
    - Annie Oakley
    - A Night at the Opera
  - 21 November
    - An Inn in Tokyo (Japan)
  - 22 November
    - Crime and Punishment
    - In Old Kentucky
    - Splendor
  - 26 November
    - Scrooge (GB)
  - 30 November
    - Frisco Kid
- December 1935
  - 3 December
    - Carnival in Flanders (France)
  - 6 December
    - Ah, Wilderness!
  - 9 December
    - The Great Impersonation
  - 17 December
    - The Ghost Goes West (GB)
  - 19 December
    - The Littlest Rebel
  - 20 December
    - Lucrezia Borgia
  - 25 December
    - The Bride Comes Home
    - Dangerous
  - 27 December
    - Professional Soldier
    - A Tale of Two Cities
  - 28 December
    - Captain Blood
  - 30 December
    - Magnificent Obsession

== Serials ==
- The Adventures of Rex and Rinty, starring Rex the Wonder Horse and Rin Tin Tin
- The Call of the Savage, directed by Lew Landers
- The Fighting Marines
- The Lost City
- The Miracle Rider, starring Tom Mix
- The New Adventures of Tarzan, starring Herman Brix
- The Phantom Empire, starring Gene Autry
- Queen of the Jungle, directed by Robert F. Hill
- The Roaring West
- Rustlers of Red Dog, directed by Lew Landers
- Tailspin Tommy in the Great Air Mystery

== Comedy film series ==
- Harold Lloyd (1913–1938)
- Charlie Chaplin (1914–1940)
- Lupino Lane (1915–1939)
- Buster Keaton (1917–1944)
- Laurel and Hardy (1921–1945)
  - Thicker than Water
- Our Gang (1922–1944)
- Harry Langdon (1924–1936)
- Wheeler and Woolsey (1929–1937)
- Marx Brothers (1929–1946)
- The Three Stooges (1934–1959)

== Animated short film series ==
- Krazy Kat (1925–1940)
- Oswald the Lucky Rabbit (1927–1938)
- Mickey Mouse (1928–1953)
- Screen Songs (1929–1938)
- Silly Symphonies (1929–1939)
  - The Tortoise and the Hare
  - The Golden Touch
  - The Robber Kitten
  - Water Babies
  - The Cookie Carnival
  - Who Killed Cock Robin?
  - Music Land
  - Three Orphan Kittens
  - Cock o' the Walk
  - Broken Toys
- Looney Tunes (1930–1969)
- Terrytoons (1930–1964)
- Merrie Melodies (1931–1969)
- Scrappy (1931–1941)
- Betty Boop (1932–1939)
- Popeye (1933–1957)
- ComiColor Cartoons (1933–1936)
- Happy Harmonies (1934–1938)
- Cartune Classics (1934–1935)
- Color Rhapsodies (1934–1949)
- Rainbow Parades (1935–1936)

== Births ==
- January 2 – John Considine, American writer and actor
- January 5 – Gerald R. Molen, American producer and actor
- January 6 – Nino Tempo, American musician, singer and actor (died 2025)
- January 8 – Elvis Presley, American pop singer, musician and actor (died 1977)
- January 9 – Bob Denver, American comic actor (died 2005)
- January 22 – Seymour Cassel, American actor (died 2019)
- January 28 – Nicholas Pryor, American actor (died 2024)
- January 30 – Elsa Martinelli, Italian actress (died 2017)
- February 3 – Jeremy Kemp, English actor (died 2019)
- February 16
  - Brian Bedford, English actor (died 2016)
  - Sonny Bono, American singer-songwriter and actor (died 1998)
- February 17 – Christina Pickles, British-American actress
- February 25 – Sally Jessy Raphael, American former tabloid talk show host
- February 26
  - Stephen Pearlman, American actor (died 1998)
  - Jane Wagner, American writer, director and producer
- March 1 – Robert Conrad, American actor, singer and stuntman (died 2020)
- March 11 – Nancy Kovack, American retired actress
- March 15 – Judd Hirsch, American actor
- March 18
  - Oumarou Ganda, Nigerian director and actor (died 1981)
  - Leslie Parrish, American actress, writer and producer (d. 2025)
- March 19 – Burt Metcalfe, Canadian-American actor (died 2022)
- March 22 – M. Emmet Walsh, American character actor and comedian (died 2024)
- March 24 – Mary Berry, English television presenter
- March 27 – Julian Glover, English actor
- March 31 – Rolf Becker, German actor (died 2025)
- April 4 – Kenneth Mars, American actor and voice actor (died 2011)
- April 5 – Enrique Álvarez Félix, Mexican actor (died 1996)
- April 9
  - Motomu Kiyokawa, Japanese actor and voice actor (died 2022)
  - Avery Schreiber, American actor and comedian (died 2002)
- April 10 – Álvaro de Luna, Spanish actor (died 2018)
- April 16
  - Al Israel, American actor (died 2011)
  - Bobby Vinton, American singer, songwriter and actor
- April 19 – Dudley Moore, English-born comic actor and musician (died 2002)
- April 20 – Mario Camus, Spanish director (died 2021)
- April 21 – Charles Grodin, American actor (died 2021)
- April 22 - Mario Machado, Chinese-American actor and broadcaster (died 2013)
- April 23 - Franco Citti, Italian actor (died 2016)
- April 27
  - Theo Angelopoulos, Greek filmmaker, screenwriter and film producer (died 2012)
  - Nikki van der Zyl, German voice-over artist (died 2021)
- April 29 - Lennie Weinrib, American actor, comedian and writer (died 2006)
- May 2
  - Brian G. Hutton, American actor and director (died 2014)
  - Lance LeGault, American film and television actor (died 2012)
- May 11 – Doug McClure, American actor (died 1995)
- May 19 - David Hartman, American television personality and media host
- May 25 - George Roubicek, Austrian actor
- May 26 – Sheila Steafel, British actress (died 2019)
- May 27
  - Carole Lesley, English actress (died 1974)
  - Lee Meriwether, American beauty queen and actress
- May 28 - Anne Reid, English actress
- May 30 – Ruta Lee, Canadian-American actress and dancer
- June 2 - Roger Brierley, English actor (died 2005)
- June 3 - Irma P. Hall, American actress (died 2026)
- June 16 – James Bolam, English actor
- June 21 - Monte Markham, American actor
- June 26 - Edwin Hodgeman, Australian actor
- June 27 – Ramon Zamora, Filipino martial arts actor (died 2007)
- June 28 - John Inman, English actor and singer (died 2007)
- June 29 - Keith Walker, American writer, producer and actor (died 1996)
- July 1 – David Prowse, English bodybuilder, weightlifter and character actor (died 2020)
- July 5 – Christian Doermer, German actor (died 2022)
- July 8 - Steve Lawrence, American singer and actor (died 2024)
- July 9 - Michael Williams, British actor (died 2001)
- July 13 – Gregorio Casal, Mexican actor (died 2018)
- July 15
  - Gianni Garko, Croatian-born Italian actor
  - Alex Karras, American football player, professional wrestler and actor (died 2012)
- July 17
  - Diahann Carroll, African American singer and actress (died 2019)
  - Donald Sutherland, Canadian-born actor (died 2024)
- July 22 - Stanley Ralph Ross, American writer and actor (died 2000)
- July 24 - Edward Donno, American actor and stunt performer (died 2014)
- July 25 - Barbara Harris, American actress (died 2018)
- July 31 - Geoffrey Lewis, American actor (died 2015)
- August 2 – Amidou, Moroccan-French actor (died 2013)
- August 3 – Omero Antonutti, Italian actor and voice actor (died 2019)
- August 4 - Carol Arthur, American actress (died 2020)
- August 5
  - Michael Ballhaus, German cinematographer (died 2017)
  - Wanda Ventham, English actress
- August 7 – Yoná Magalhães, Brazilian actress (died 2015)
- August 8 - Donald P. Bellisario, American television producer and screenwriter
- August 12
  - John Cazale, American actor (died 1978)
  - Phyllis MacMahon, Irish actress (died 2026)
- August 15 – Jim Dale, English actor, director and singer
- August 16 – Janet Henfrey, British actress
- August 23 – Ronald Falk, Australian actor (died 2016)
- August 24 – Lando Buzzanca, Italian actor (died 2022)
- August 28 – Sonny Shroyer, American actor and singer
- August 29 – William Friedkin, American director, producer and screenwriter (died 2023)
- August 31 – Rosenda Monteros, Mexican actress (died 2018)
- September 2 – Kenneth Tsang, Hong Kong actor (died 2022)
- September 9
  - Nadim Sawalha, Jordanian-British actor
  - Chaim Topol, Israeli actor, singer, comedian and producer (died 2023)
- September 21 – Henry Gibson, American actor, singer and songwriter (died 2009)
- September 24 – Sean McCann, Canadian actor (died 2019)
- September 28 – Ronald Lacey, English actor (died 1991)
- September 29 – Mylène Demongeot, French actress (died 2022)
- October 1 – Julie Andrews, English-born singer and actress
- October 3 – Armen Dzhigarkhanyan, Soviet Russian-Armenian actor (died 2020)
- October 4 – Eddie Applegate, American actor (died 2016)
- October 18 – Peter Boyle, American actor (died 2006)
- October 20 – Jerry Orbach, American actor and singer (died 2004)
- October 24 – Rosamaria Murtinho, Brazilian actress
- October 27 – Frank Adonis, American actor (died 2018)
- October 29 – Peter Watkins, English-born documentary filmmaker (died 2025)
- October 31 – Charles Cioffi, American actor (died 2026)
- November 7
  - Billy "Green" Bush, American actor
  - Judy Parfitt, English actress
- November 8 – Alain Delon, French actor (died 2024)
- November 13 – Tom Atkins, American actor
- November 21 – Michael Chapman, American cinematographer (died 2020)
- November 22 – Michael Callan, American actor (died 2022)
- November 24 – Salim Khan, Indian Bollywood screenwriter
- November 29
  - Diane Ladd, American actress (died 2025)
  - Amanda Walker, English actress
- November 30 – Woody Allen, American comedian, director and actor
- December 2 – Hy Pyke, American character actor (died 2006)
- December 5 – Basabi Nandi, Indian actress (died 2018)
- December 8
  - Dharmendra, Indian film actor, producer and politician (died 2025)
  - Hans-Jürgen Syberberg, German director
- December 10 – Jaromil Jireš, Czechoslovak director (died 2001)
- December 14
  - Lewis Arquette, American actor, writer and producer (died 2001)
  - Lee Remick, American actress (died 1991)
- December 18 - Rosemary Leach, British actress (died 2017)
- December 21
  - John G. Avildsen, American director (died 2017)
  - Phil Donahue, American media personality, writer and producer (died 2024)
- December 24 - Tommy Dysart, Scottish-born Australian actor (died 2022)
- December 28 - William Bassett, American actor (died 2025)
- December 30 - Jack Riley, American actor, comedian and writer (died 2016)

== Deaths ==
- January 19 – Lloyd Hamilton, American comedy actor (born 1891)
- February 7 – Frederick Warde, English Shakespearean actor (born 1851)
- March 8 – Ruan Lingyu, Chinese silent film actress, committed suicide (born 1910)
- March 20 - William "Stage" Boyd, American actor, (born 1886)
- March 21 - William Conklin, American silent film actor, (born 1872)
- March 23 – Florence Moore, American singer and silent film actress (born 1886)
- May 4 – Junior Durkin, American actor, in a road accident (born 1915)
- May 13 – Clarence Geldart, Canadian-American actor (born 1867)
- August 14 – Léonce Perret, French actor, director and producer (born 1880)
- August 15 – Will Rogers, American humorist and actor (born 1879)
- August 25 – Mack Swain, American actor (born 1876)
- September 28 – William Kennedy Dickson, British film pioneer, cancer (born 1860)
- December 16 – Thelma Todd, American actress, carbon monoxide poisoning (born 1906)

== Film debuts ==
- Don Ameche – Dante's Inferno
- Pedro Armendáriz – Rosario
- Ewald Balser – Jana, the Girl from the Bohemian Forest
- Benny Bartlett – Millions in the Air
- William Benedict – $10 Raise
- Nana Bryant – Unknown Woman
- Sebastian Cabot – Foreign Affaires
- Elisa Cegani – Aldebaran
- Charles Coburn – The People's Enemy
- Joan Davis – Millions in the Air
- Olivia de Havilland – Alibi Ike
- Buddy Ebsen – Broadway Melody of 1936
- Edythe Elliott – Show Them No Mercy!
- Fred Emney – Brewster's Millions
- Henry Fonda – The Farmer Takes of Wife
- Joan Fontaine – No More Ladies
- Pina Gallini – Red Passport
- Leo Genn – Immortal Gentleman
- Gorella Gori – The Three-Cornered Hat
- Paul Guilfoyle – Special Agent
- Jon Hall – Women Must Dress
- Walter Hudd – Moscow Nights
- Vida Hope – The 39 Steps
- Marsha Hunt – The Virginia Judge
- Frieda Inescort – The Dark Angel
- Douglas Kennedy – G Men
- Jeni Le Gon – Hooray for Love
- Leny Marenbach – Jana, the Girl from the Bohemian Forest
- Howard Marion-Crawford – Me and Marlborough
- James Mason – Late Extra
- Carole Mathews – Here's to Romance
- Burgess Meredith – The Scoundrel
- Kenneth More – Look Up and Laugh
- Robert Morley – Scrooge
- Lloyd Nolan – G Men
- Amalia Pellegrini – The Three-Cornered Hat
- Jacqueline Porel – Les beaux jours
- Anthony Quayle – Moscow Nights
- Roy Rogers – Slightly Static
- Janet Shaw – She Married Her Boss
- Alastair Sim – The Riverside Murder
- Lionel Stander – The Scoundrel
- James Stewart – The Murder Man
- Milburn Stone – Ladies Crave Excitement
- Mária Sulyok – Dream Love
- Karl Swenson – Strangers All
- Joan Valerie – Fighting Youth
- Dorothy Vaughn – Annapolis Farewell
- Margaret Withers – The Guv'nor
- Hank Worden – Barbary Coast
- Will Wright – It's a Small World
