= Pierre Richard-Willm =

French actor

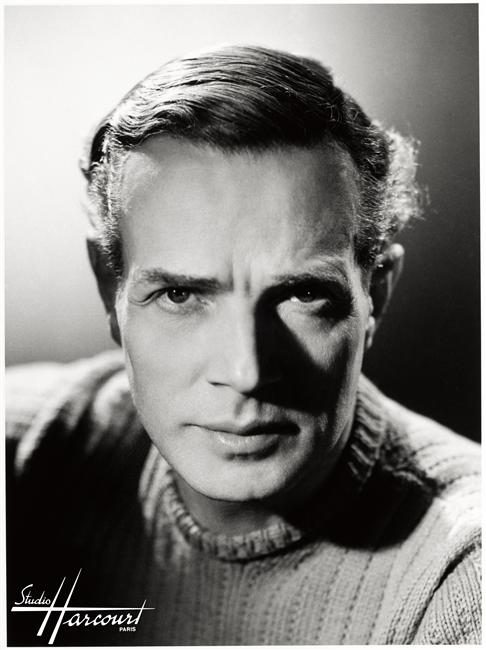
- Richard-Willm in 1941
- Born: Alexandre-Pierre Richard; 3 November 1895; Bayonne, France
- Died: 12 April 1983 (aged 87); Paris, France
- Occupations: actor, designer, sculptor
- Website: richardwillm.free.fr

Pierre Richard-Willm (3 November 1895 – 12 April 1983) was a French stage and film actor during the 1930s and 1940s.

== Biography ==
Pierre Richard-Willm (originally Alexandre-Pierre Richard) was born in south-western France in the city of Bayonne. He was brought up at first in Barcelona and then, after the death of his mother Elisabeth-Fanny Willm, in Paris. In 1916 he joined the army, and fought during World War I.

After the war he became a sculptor, and in 1921 he started playing bit roles on stage. In 1924 he took part of in the sculpturing art competition of the Games of the VIII Olympiad, making a group of sculptures on rugby and skating.

In 1925 he was chosen by Ida Rubinstein to appear with her in a stage production of La Dame aux camélias at the Odéon in Paris, and other leading roles at that theatre followed. His film debut came in Toute sa vie (1930, under the direction of Alberto Cavalcanti, and in 1934 he found one of his most successful film roles in Jacques Feyder's Le Grand Jeu. Throughout the 1930s he made several films each year, often appearing as military or aristocratic characters, and he became a very popular star despite feeling sometimes ill at ease with his romantic screen persona.

One of Richard-Willm's frequent co-stars was Edwige Feuillère, and it was with her that he returned to the stage in Paris and on tour in La Dame aux Camélias in 1940/41. He also continued acting in films during World War II, including the role of Edmond Dantes in Le Comte de Monte-Cristo.

In 1946 he decided to give up working in the cinema and he went to the Théâtre du Peuple in Bussang in the Vosges, a theatre with which he had maintained a close connection ever since his first visit there as a teenager in 1911. He became its artistic director from 1946 until 1971 and in numerous new productions he worked extensively on the design of sets and costumes.

In 1975 Richard-Willm published his autobiography under the title Loin des étoiles. He died in Paris, and is buried at the cemetery in Bussang.

== Filmography ==
Year	Original title	English title	Director	Role
1930	Toute sa vie		Alberto Cavalcanti	Stanley Vanning
1931	Les Vacances du diable	The Devil's Holiday	Alberto Cavalcanti	Dr. Reynolds
1931	Un soir, au front		Alexandre Ryder	Lieutenant Siredon
1931	Autour d'une enquête	About an Inquest	Robert Siodmak & Henri Chomette	Paul Bernt
1932	Le Petit Écart		Reinhold Schünzel & Henri Chomette	Bernard Heller, lawyer
1932	Kiki		Pierre Billon & Karel Lamač	Raymond Leroy
1932	Baby		Pierre Billon & Karel Lamač	Lord Cecil
1932	Les Amours de Pergolèse		Guido Brignone	Pergolèse
1932	Sous le casque de cuir	Under the Leather Helmet	Albert de Courville	Captain Sourvian
1933	Pour être aimé	To Be Loved	Jacques Tourneur	Gérard d'Ormoise
1933	La Fille du régiment		Pierre Billon & Karel Lamač	Lord Robert
1933	L'Épervier	The Sparrowhawk	Marcel L'Herbier	René de Tierrache
1934	Le Prince Jean	Prince Jean	Jean de Marguenat	Prince Jean d'Axel
1934	La Maison dans la dune	The House on the Dune	Pierre Billon	Sylvain
1934	Le Grand Jeu		Jacques Feyder	Pierre Martel
1934	Fanatisme		Gaston Ravel & Tony Lekain	Marcel Besnard
1934	Les Nuits moscovites	Moscow Nights	Alexis Granowsky	Captain Ignatoff
1935	Stradivarius		Géza von Bolváry & Albert Valentin	Sándor Teleky
1935	Barcarolle		Gerhard Lamprecht & Roger Le Bon	Bianco Colloredo
1935	La Route impériale		Marcel L'Herbier	Lieut. Brent
1936	Anne-Marie		Raymond Bernard	L'inventeur
1936	L'Argent		Pierre Billon	Saccard
1937	Courrier sud	Southern Mail	Pierre Billon	Jacques Bernis
1937	Un carnet de bal	Life Dances On	Julien Duvivier	Eric Irvin
1937	La Dame de Malacca	Woman of Malacca	Marc Allégret	Prince Selim
1937	Yoshiwara		Max Ophüls	Lieutenant Serge Polenoff
1937	Au service du tsar	In the Service of the Tsar	Pierre Billon	Count Tomsky
1938	Le Roman de Werther	The Novel of Werther	Max Ophüls	Werther
1938	La Tragédie impériale	Rasputin	Marcel L'Herbier	Count Igor Kourloff
1938	La principessa Tarakanova / Tarakanowa	Princess Tarakanova	Fedor Ozep	Count Orloff
1939	La Loi du nord	Law of the North	Jacques Feyder	Robert Shaw
1939	Entente cordiale	Entente cordiale	Marcel L'Herbier	Captain Charles Roussel
1941	Les Jours heureux	Happy Days	Jean de Marguenat	Michel
1942	La Duchesse de Langeais		Jacques de Baroncelli	Armand de Montriveau
1942	La Croisée des chemins	The Crossroads	André Berthomieu	Pascal Rouvray
1943	Le Comte de Monte-Cristo	The Count of Monte Cristo	Robert Vernay	Edmond Dantès
1945	La Fiancée des ténèbres		Serge de Poligny	Roland Samblaca
1947	Rêves d'amour	Dreams of Love	Christian Stengel	Franz Liszt
1947	Le Beau Voyage	The Beautiful Trip	Louis Cuny	Richard
