= But Not in Vain =

1948 British film by Edmond T. Gréville

But Not in Vain/Niet Tevergeefs
- Promotional card featuring (l. to r.) Bruce Lester, Martin Benson and Carol van Derman
- Directed by: Edmond T. Gréville
- Written by: Ben van Eysselsteijn
- Produced by: Geoffrey Goodheart; Gus E. Ostwalt
- Starring: Martin Benson; Bruce Lester; Raymond Lovell; Jan Retèl; Carol van Derman; John Van Dreelen; Matthieu van Eysden
- Cinematography: Ernest Palmer; Hone Glendinning
- Edited by: Douglas Robertson
- Music by: Gerbrand Schurmann
- Distributed by: Butcher's Film Service
- Release date: 31 December 1948
- Running time: English version 73 min., Dutch version 74 min.
- Countries: United Kingdom; Netherlands
- Languages: English; Dutch

But Not in Vain (Dutch name Niet Tevergeefs) is a 1948 Anglo-Dutch World War II drama, directed by Edmond T. Gréville and starring Raymond Lovell. The film is set in 1944 in the occupied Netherlands, and was shot at the Cinetone Studios in Amsterdam, with exterior filming taking place at locations in and around the city. The film also incorporates authentic wartime footage filmed by members of the Dutch Resistance. The Dutch version of the film was the first Dutch production of a feature film after World War II.

== Plot ==
In late 1944, the Hongerwinter famine is starting to bite in the occupied northern and western Netherlands and Nazi persecution is rife. The farm of Jan Alting, a Dutch patriot who has disowned his son for his collaboration with the occupying German forces, is known by the Dutch Resistance as a place of refuge for those who are in danger from the Germans. With the help of his daughter Elly, Alting is currently providing shelter for Jewish couple Mark and Mary Meyer; van Nespen, an aristocrat with active links to the underground movement, and Bakker, a Communist wanted by the Germans for sabotage. All are aware of the constant risk of betrayal and exposure.

Jan's son Anton returns unexpectedly to his former home, and discovers that his father and sister are harbouring subversives. He orders his father to turn them out immediately, threatening to shoot them all if this is not done. Jan is faced with the seemingly irreconcilable demands of patriotism and responsibility for the safety of his shelterers, set against the feelings he still has for Anton, despite the latter's betrayal of all Jan stands for. He faces the stark moral choice of failing those to whom he has given refuge, or conspiring with them to kill his own son.

== Origin of the name ==
The film's name is derived from a wartime radio speech by the exiled Queen Wilhelmina of the Netherlands, exhorting her people to resist the Nazi occupation and promising that their struggle and sacrifice would not be in vain.

== Cast ==
- Raymond Lovell as Jan Alting
- Carol van Derman as Elly Alting
- Bruce Lester as Fred van Nespen
- Martin Benson as Mark Meyer
- Agnes Bernelle as Mary Meyer
- Julian Dallas as Willem Bakker
- Jordan Lawrence as Anton
- Ben van Esselstyn as Sgt. Eeslyn
- Harry Croizet as Skipper

== Later history ==
But Not in Vain was first screened in December 1948; however surviving contemporary reviews all date from early 1950, leading to the assumption that a general release was delayed until then for unknown reasons. The film received some generally favourable reviews, with Today's Cinema describing it as "intelligently directed, always with artistry and sometimes with real dramatic power", and the Daily Film Renter praising "well-drawn characters, gripping story and happy climax". The Monthly Film Bulletin in contrast dismissed it as "uniquely incompetent".

The British Film Institute has been unable to locate a print of the film for inclusion in the BFI National Archive, and classes it as "missing, believed lost". There is increasing interest by film historians in Gréville's directorial career, with the same year's Noose being particularly highly regarded. The current absence of But Not in Vain represents a crucial gap in Gréville's filmography, and the BFI lists the film as one of its "75 Most Wanted" missing British feature films.
