= France Roche =

French actress (1921–2013)

- Born: 2 April 1921; Saint-Tropez, France
- Died: 14 December 2013 (aged 92); Paris, France
- Occupations: Actress, screenwriter
- Years active: 1951–1979

France Roche (2 April 1921 – 14 December 2013) was a French film actress, screenwriter, journalist, and film critic. She appeared in 17 films between 1951 and 1979. She was a member of the jury at the 11th Berlin International Film Festival.

== Selected filmography ==
- Without Leaving an Address (1951)
- Adorables créatures (1952)
- Follow That Man (1953)
- Zoé (1954)
- The Red Cloak (1955)
- Pity for the Vamps (1956)
- Amour de poche (1957)
- Les Lions sont lâchés (1961; writer)
- Nuit d'ivresse (1986)
