= Stradivarius (film) =

1935 film

- Directed by: Albert Valentin; Géza von Bolváry
- Written by: Jacques Bousquet; Ernst Marischka
- Produced by: Siegfried Fritz Fromm
- Starring: Pierre Richard-Willm; Edwige Feuillère; Robert Arnoux
- Cinematography: Werner Brandes
- Edited by: Hermann Haller
- Music by: Alois Melichar
- Production company: Boston Film
- Distributed by: Films Sonores Tobis
- Release date: 18 October 1935
- Running time: 100 minutes
- Country: Germany
- Language: French

Stradivarius is a 1935 drama film directed by Albert Valentin and Géza von Bolváry and starring Pierre Richard-Willm, Edwige Feuillère, and Robert Arnoux. It was made by Tobis Film as the French-language version of the film Stradivari.

The film's sets were designed by the art director Emil Hasler.

== Cast ==
- Pierre Richard-Willm as Sándor Teleky
- Edwige Feuillère as Maria Belloni
- Robert Arnoux as Imre Berczy
- Evelyne May as Irène Kardos
- Jean Galland as Dr. Pietro Rossi
- Jean Toulout as Professor Hoefer
- Fernand Bercher as Antonio Stradivari
- Louis Gauthier as Nicolo Amati
- Jacques Erwin as Officier
- Marcella Albani
- Paul Amiot
- Junie Astor
- Litta Cléry as Une infirmière
- Blanche Denège
- Victor Vina

== Reception ==
Writing for Night and Day in 1937, Graham Greene gave the film a poor review, describing it as "the worst film to be seen in London". Greene's main complaint was the unrealistic and overacted effect of "sublimated sexuality" that the titular violin has on the listeners. Greene also criticized the acting of Bercher and Gauthier in the "dreadful hark-back to seventeenth-century Cremona" where Stradivari creates the violin.

== Bibliography ==
- Bock, Hans-Michael; Bergfelder, Tim, eds. (2009). The Concise Cinegraph: Encyclopaedia of German Cinema. New York: Berghahn Books. ISBN 978-1-57181-655-9.
- Passerini, Luisa; Labanyi, Jo; Diehl, Karen, eds. (2012). Europe and Love in Cinema. Bristol: Intellect Books. ISBN 978-1-84150-672-2.
