= Maurice Maillot =

French actor

- Born: September 18, 1906; Rethel, Ardennes, France
- Died: February 8, 1968 (aged 61); Paris, France
- Occupation: Actor

Maurice Maillot (18 September 1906 – 8 February 1968) was a French film and theater actor. He was born in Rethel, Ardennes, and died in Paris.

== Selected filmography ==
- The Indictment (1931)
- The Wandering Beast (1932)
- Rouletabille the Aviator (1932)
- Odette (1934)
- Merchant of Love (1935)
- Adémaï in the Middle Ages (1935)
- Whirlpool of Desire (1935)
- The Happy Road (1936)
- Champions of France (1938)
- Camp Thirteen (1940)
- Threats (1940)
- Dorothy Looks for Love (1945)
