= Threats (film) =

1940 film

- Directed by: Edmond T. Gréville
- Written by: Curt Alexander; Edmond T. Gréville; Pierre Lestringuez
- Produced by: Pierre Braunberger
- Starring: Mireille Balin; John Loder; Ginette Leclerc; Erich von Stroheim
- Cinematography: Alain Douarinou; Nicolas Hayer; Otto Heller; André Thomas
- Edited by: Tennisen
- Music by: Maurice Bellecour; Guy Lafarge
- Production companies: Société de Production du Film Cinq Jours d'Angoisse; Union Française de Production Cinématographique
- Distributed by: Les Films G.É.C.É
- Release date: 11 January 1940
- Running time: 95 minutes
- Country: France
- Language: French

Threats (French: Menaces) is a 1940 French drama film directed by Edmond T. Gréville and starring Mireille Balin, John Loder, Ginette Leclerc and Erich von Stroheim. Gréville began production on the film shortly after the Munich Agreement of September 1938. It was shot at the François 1er Studios in Paris. The film's sets were designed by the art director Lucien Jaquelux.

== Synopsis ==
In the late 1930s, a number of refugees from various European countries are living in the same hotel in the Latin Quarter of Paris. The caring Denise is sympathetic to their plight, particularly that of Professor Hoffman who is in exile from his family and homeland. The more frivolous Ginette, meanwhile, uses the hotel for rendezvous with her lover, Dick Stone, an Englishman living abroad to avoid potential military service. The prospect of the impending Second World War plays an increasing role on the various characters.

== Cast ==
- Mireille Balin as Denise
- John Loder as Dick Stone
- Ginette Leclerc as Ginette
- Erich von Stroheim as Le professeur Hoffman
- Vanda Gréville as L'américaine
- Maurice Maillot as Mouret
- Paul Demange as Le domestique
- Jacques Henley as Le Hollandais
- René Charles as Un journaliste
- Robert Moor as Le philatéliste
- Nicolas Rimsky as Wladimir
- Elisabeth Donnathas Marischka
- Nina Sinclair as La première
- Albert Malbert as Le chauffeur de taxi
- Marcelle Monthil as La directrice de la maison de couture
- Henri Bosc as Carbonero
- Madeleine Lambert as La patronne de l'hôtel
- Jean Galland as Louis
- Jane Pierson as L'essayeuse

== Bibliography ==
- Bessy, Maurice & Chirat, Raymond. Histoire du cinéma français: 1935-1939. Pygmalion, 1986.
- Crisp, Colin. Genre, Myth and Convention in the French Cinema, 1929-1939. Indiana University Press, 2002.
- Lennig, Arthur. Stroheim. University Press of Kentucky, 2004.
- Neupert, Richard. French Film History, 1895–1946. University of Wisconsin Pres, 2022.
- Rège, Philippe. Encyclopedia of French Film Directors, Volume 1. Scarecrow Press, 2009.
