= Jacques Tarride =

French actor

Jacques Tarride (10 March 1903 – 5 October 1994) was a French actor.

== Biography ==
He was born in the 8th arrondissement of Paris and died in La Loupe, Eure-et-Loir. He was the son of the actor Abel Tarride and the brother of the director Jean Tarride.

== Partial filmography ==
- Amour... amour... (1932) - Bob
- A Gentleman of the Ring (1932) - Le marquis
- The Man with a Broken Ear (1934) - Léon Renaud
- Notre-Dame d'amour (1936)
- Je chante (1938) - Le patron du café (uncredited)
- Immediate Call (1939) - Le secrétaire
- Sacred Woods (1939)
- Cristobal's Gold (1940) - Le médecin
- Strange Suzy (1941)
- The Murderer is Afraid at Night (1942) - Joseph
- Promise to a Stranger (1942) - Le bijoutier
- Feu sacré (1942)
- The Crossroads (1942) - Julien
- A Woman in the Night (1943) - Un comédien
- Départ à zéro (1943) - Malicart
- Death No Longer Awaits (1944) - Le juge Armandy
- Manon, a 326 (1945)
- La troisième dalle (1946) - Le valet de chambre
- Captain Blomet (1947)
- Si jeunesse savait... (1948) - Le professeur
- The Cupboard Was Bare (1948) - Le commissaire-priseur
- Fantômas contre Fantômas (1949) - Le poète
- Tous les deux (1949) - Le vétérinaire
- The Widow and the Innocent (1949)) - Charles
- At the Grand Balcony (1949) - Macherel
- Three Telegrams (1950) - M. Grandjean
- Lost Souvenirs (1950) - Le secrétaire
- Under the Sky of Paris (1951) - Un journaliste (uncredited)
- Clara de Montargis (1951)
- Les deux Monsieur de Madame (1951) - L'assistant
- Nana (1955) - Mignom
- Folies-Bergère (1957) - Adjoint du maire (final film role)
