= Yvonne Claudie =

French actress

Yvonne Claudie (born Yvonne Marie Augustine Stocanne, (21 March 1891 - 5 June 1974) was a French actress. She was the French voice of Magda Schneider, in the films of the Sissi trilogy based on the life of Empress Elisabeth of Austria.

== Filmography ==
- The 400 Blows (1959)
- Gervaise (1956)
- L'Étrange Désir de monsieur Bard (1954)
- Clara de Montargis (1951)
- The Beauty of Cadiz (1953)
- The Imberger Mystery (1935)
- The Forsaken (1937)
