= Robert Moor =

French actor

- Born: 17 July 1889; France
- Died: 23 December 1972 (aged 83); France
- Occupation: Actor

Robert Moor (17 July 1889 – 23 December 1972) was a French actor.

== Selected filmography ==
- Une jeune fille et un million (1932) - Pimpant
- Riri et Nono en vacances (1932)
- Le soir des rois (1933) - Ferdinand Albaret
- The Abbot Constantine (1933) - Comte de Larnac
- Knock (1933) - L'instituteur
- Étienne (1933) - Le directeur
- Madame Bovary (1934) - Doorman (uncredited)
- They Were Five (1936) - Un locataire
- The Man from Nowhere (1937) - Le fossoyeur
- The Red Dancer (1937)
- Le cantinier de la coloniale (1937) - (uncredited)
- Aloha, le chant des îles (1937)
- Rasputin (1938) - Maître-d'hôtel d'Ania (uncredited)
- Street Without Joy (1938) - (uncredited)
- L'ange que j'ai vendu (1938)
- Café de Paris (1938) - Un agent
- Sirocco (1938) - Le domestique de Chervin (uncredited)
- The Curtain Rises (1938) - Albert, le concierge (uncredited)
- Monsieur Coccinelle (1938) - Un médecin
- La route enchantée (1938) - Le duc de Bocanegra père
- Je chante (1938) - Béranger
- Thérèse Martin (1939) - M. Guérin
- Behind the Facade (1939) - Un agent (uncredited)
- La Loi du Nord (1939) - Parker
- Threats (1940) - Le philatéliste
- The Crossroads (1942) - Emile
- Les petits riens (1942)
- A Woman in the Night (1943) - Le baron Hochecorne
- Don't Shout It from the Rooftops (1943) - Le deuxième commanditaire
- Arlette and Love (1943) - Mathurin
- My First Love (1945) - Firmin
- Marie la Misère (1945)
- Girl with Grey Eyes (1945)
- Hanged Man's Farm (1945) - Le notaire
- Raboliot (1946)
- Les gosses mènent l'enquête (1947) - Un professeur
- Mirror (1947) - Antoine
- Fantômas (1947) - Le professeur Cauchard
- The Great Maguet (1947) - Le médecin
- Si jeunesse savait... (1948) - Le médecin
- Man to Men (1948) - Un valet (uncredited)
- Fantomas Against Fantomas (1949) - Le médecin légiste
- Tous les deux (1949) - Un employé
- Du Guesclin (1949) - Le mage
- The Barton Mystery (1949) - Le domestique
- The Perfume of the Lady in Black (1949) - Un homme à la soirée chez Rouletabille (uncredited)
- Dominique (1950) - Oncle Charles
- Justice Is Done (1950) - Le professeur Georges Limousin (uncredited)
- Lost Souvenirs (1950) - Le notaire (uncredited)
- Topaze (1951) - Le vénérable vieillard
- Under the Sky of Paris (1951) - Un examinateur (uncredited)
- Rue des Saussaies (1951) - Le chimiste
- The Most Beautiful Girl in the World (1951) - Un membre du cercle
- Great Man (1951) - Le professeur Peccavi
- Run Away Mr. Perle (1952) - Un docteur du train (uncredited)
- Les amours finissent à l'aube (1953) - (uncredited)
- The Slave (1953) - Le violoniste
- The Earrings of Madame De... (1953) - Un diplomate (uncredited)
- Napoleon Road (1953) - Un administrateur (uncredited)
- His Father's Portrait (1953) - Le premier clerc (uncredited)
- Stain in the Snow (1954) - Le professeur
- Leguignon guérisseur (1954) - Le notaire (uncredited)
- Queen Margot (1954) - Le procureur
- Black Dossier (1955) - M. de Montesson
- The Case of Doctor Laurent (1957) - Un docteur
- Madame et son auto (1958) - Licaire
- Vive Henri IV... vive l'amour! (1961) - (uncredited)
- Auguste (1961) - Un officiel (uncredited)
- Le monte-charge (1962)
- Good Luck, Charlie (1962) - Berthier
- A Matter of Resistance (1966) - Plantier the Gardener (uncredited) (final film role)
