= Charlotte Clasis =

French actress

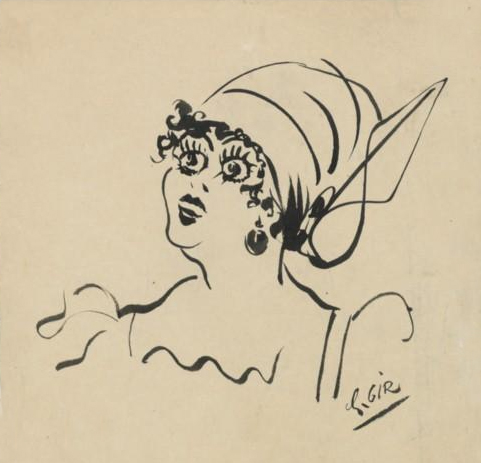
- A 1922 caricature.
- Born: 20 September 1891; Caen, Calvados, France
- Died: 17 April 1974 (aged 82); Boulogne-Billancourt, Hauts-de-Seine, France
- Occupation: Actress
- Years active: 1925–1952 (film)

Charlotte Clasis (1891–1974) was a French theatre and film actress. Early in her career she poses as a model for the artist Auguste Renoir and was later cast by his son Jean Renoir in two of his films the 1925 silent The Whirlpool of Fate (1925) and the poetic realist The Human Beast (1938).

== Selected filmography ==
- The Whirlpool of Fate (1925)
- Black and White (1931)
- Sapho (1934)
- I Have an Idea (1934)
- The Happy Road (1936)
- Woman of Malacca (1937)
- My Little Marquise (1937)
- The Human Beast (1938)
- The Marvelous Night (1940)
- The Beautiful Adventure (1942)
- Promise to a Stranger (1942)
- The Murderer is Afraid at Night (1942)
- Twilight (1944)
- Minne (1950)
- Her Last Christmas (1952)

== Bibliography ==
- Crisp, Colin. French Cinema—A Critical Filmography: Volume 1, 1929-1939. Indiana University Press, 2015.
- Goble, Alan. The Complete Index to Literary Sources in Film. Walter de Gruyter, 1999.
- Merigeau, Pascal . Jean Renoir: A Biography. Hachette, 2017.
