= Vanda Gréville =

British actress (1908–1997)

- Born: Wanda MacEwan; 10 January 1908; London, England
- Died: 26 December 1997 (aged 89); Westgate-on-Sea, Kent, England
- Occupation: Actress
- Years active: 1930-1946 (film)

Vanda Gréville (born Wanda MacEwan; 10 January 1908 – 26 December 1997) was a British film actress who mainly appeared in French productions. She was the wife of the Anglo-French director Edmond T. Gréville.

== Selected filmography ==
- A Gentleman of Paris (1931)
- Le Bal (1931)
- Le Million (1931)
- The Train of Suicides (1931)
- Ebb Tide (1932)
- A Gentleman of the Ring (1932)
- Gold in the Street (1934)
- La Garçonne (1936)
- Threats (1940)
- The Suitors Club (1941)
- A Woman in the Night (1943)

== Bibliography ==
- Jonathan Driskell. The French Screen Goddess: Film Stardom and the Modern Woman in 1930s France. I.B.Tauris, 2015.
