= The Crossroads (1942 film) =

1942 film

- Directed by: André Berthomieu
- Written by: André-Paul Antoine
- Based on: The Crossroads; 1909 novel by Henry Bordeaux
- Produced by: Marcel Pagnol; J.H. Théry
- Starring: Pierre Richard-Willm; Josette Day; Madeleine Robinson
- Cinematography: André Thomas
- Edited by: De Bissy
- Music by: Georges Derveaux
- Production company: Films Marcel Pagnol
- Distributed by: Gaumont
- Release date: 2 December 1942
- Running time: 90 minutes
- Country: France
- Language: French

The Crossroads (French: La Croisée des chemins) is a 1942 French drama film directed by André Berthomieu and starring Pierre Richard-Willm, Josette Day and Madeleine Robinson. It is based on the 1909 novel of the same title by Henry Bordeaux. The film's sets were designed by the art director Robert Giordani.

== Cast ==
- Pierre Richard-Willm as Pascal Rouvray
- Josette Day as Laurence Chassal
- Pierre Brasseur as Hubert Epervans
- Gisèle Parry as Claire
- Madeleine Robinson as Henriette Rouvray
- Georges Lannes as Félix Chassal
- Jacques Tarride as Julien
- Jean Toulout as Hérault
- Paul Barré as Gardannes
- Alexandre Fabry as Le maire
- Albert Gercourt as La facteur
- Robert Moor as Emile
- Gaston Séverin as Maître Berthier
- Raymonde Vernay as La mère

== Bibliography ==
- Goble, Alan. The Complete Index to Literary Sources in Film. Walter de Gruyter, 1999.
- Griffiths, Kate & Watts, Andrew. The History of French Literature on Film. Bloomsbury Publishing USA, 2020..
- Rège, Philippe. Encyclopedia of French Film Directors, Volume 1. Scarecrow Press, 2009.
