= Vittorio Rieti =

Italian and American composer (1898–1994)

Vittorio Rieti (28 January 1898 – 19 February 1994) was an Italian and American composer.

== Biography ==
Rieti was born to a family of Jewish descent in Alexandria, Kingdom of Egypt. He later moved to Milan to study economics. Subsequently, he studied music in Rome with Ottorino Respighi and Alfredo Casella, and lived there until 1940.

In 1925, he temporarily moved to Paris and composed music for George Balanchine's ballet for Serge Diaghilev's Ballets Russes, Barabau. He met his wife in Alexandria. He was a cousin of actor Vittorio Rietti.

He emigrated to the United States in 1940, becoming a naturalized American citizen on 1 June 1944. He taught at the Peabody Conservatory of Music in Baltimore (1948–49), Chicago Musical College (1950–54), Queens College, New York (1958–60), and New York College of Music (1960–64). He died in New York on 19 February 1994.

== Selected works ==
Ballet

- Barabau (1925)
- Le bal (1929)
- La Sonnambula (1946)

Orchestral

- Symphony No. 3 (1932)
- Symphony No. 4 (1942)
- Suite "La Fontaine" (1968)

Concertante

- Piano Concerto No. 1 (1926)
- Piano Concerto No. 2 (1937)
- Piano Concerto No. 3 (1955)
- Concerto for harpsichord and orchestra (1952–1955, 1972)
- Cello Concerto No. 2 (1953)
- Concerto for 2 Pianos and orchestra (1951)
- Triple Concerto for violin, viola, piano and orchestra (1971)

Chamber music

- Capriccio for violin and piano (1941)
- Partita for harpsichord, flute, oboe, 2 violins, viola and cello (1945)
- String Quartet No. 3 (1951)
- Woodwind Quintet (1957)
- String Quartet No. 4 (1960)
- Concertino for 5 Instruments for flute, viola, cello, harp and harpsichord (1963)
- Pastorale e fughetta for flute, viola and piano (or harpsichord) (1966)
- Sonata à 5 for flute, oboe, clarinet, bassoon and piano (1966)
- Incisioni for brass quintet (1967)
- Silografie for flute, oboe, clarinet, horn and basson (1967)
- Sestetto pro Gemini for flute, oboe, piano, violin, viola and cello (1975)

Keyboard

- Second Avenue Waltzes for 2 pianos (1942)
- Sonata all' Antica for harpsichord (1946)
- Suite champêtre for 2 pianos (1948)
- Medieval Variations (1962)
- Chorale, variazioni e finale for 2 pianos (1969)

Film music

- Your Money or Your Life, directed by Carlo Ludovico Bragaglia (1933)
- Ritorno alla terra, directed by Mario Franchini (1934)
- Amore, directed by Carlo Ludovico Bragaglia (1935)
- The Happy Road (La route heureuse), directed by Georges Lacombe (1936)
- The Cuckoo Clock, directed by Camillo Mastrocinque (1938)
