= A Gentleman of Paris (1931 film) =

1931 film

- Directed by: Sinclair Hill
- Written by: Sewell Collins; Sidney Gilliat
- Based on: "His Honour, the Judge" by Niranjan Pal
- Produced by: Michael Balcon
- Starring: Arthur Wontner; Vanda Gréville; Hugh Williams
- Cinematography: Mutz Greenbaum
- Production company: Gaumont British Picture Corporation
- Distributed by: Gaumont British Distributors
- Release date: 9 December 1931
- Running time: 78 minutes
- Country: United Kingdom
- Language: English

A Gentleman of Paris (also known as A Gentleman of France and A Gentleman from Paris) is a 1931 British crime drama film directed by Sinclair Hill and starring Arthur Wontner, Vanda Gréville and Hugh Williams. It was written by Sewell Collins and Sidney Gilliat based on the story "His Honour, the Judge" by Niranjan Pal. It was made as a quota quickie at Cricklewood and Lime Grove Studios.

== Plot ==
Judge Lefevre is a serial philanderer who fails to live up to the standards of his office. He starts an affaire with Paulette Gerard, wife of a junior counsel, and while they are in Montmartre witnesses café proprietor Duvalshot dead by his jealous wife, Lola, who frames Madeleine, Lefevre's ex-mistress. Madeleine is put on trial in Lefevre's court and is found guilty. But Lefevre still retains a sense of honour, and absolves her, to the ruin of his reputation.

== Cast ==
- Arthur Wontner as Judge Le Fevre
- Vanda Gréville as Paulette Gerrard
- Hugh Williams as Gaston Gerrard
- Phyllis Konstam as Madeleine
- Sybil Thorndike as Lola Duval
- Arthur Goullet as Bagot
- George Merritt as M. Duval
- Frederick Lloyd as Advocate
- George De Warfaz as valet
- Dylan Rees as barista
- Florence Wood as concierge
- Corin Dickly as Professor Beardson

== Reception ==
Film Weekly wrote: "Coincidence is stretched until it puts a strain on credulity in the central situation in which this particular Gentleman of Paris finds himself, yet the story is somehow saved from trailing away into the realms of the utterly impossible. ... Sybil Thorndike gives an extraordinary exhibition of overacting, while Vanda Greville looks sufficiently French until she starts to speak. Phyllis Konstam is best, as the girl who comes off worst. A Gentleman of Paris is a fair melodrama, with many rather glaring weaknesses."

Kine Weekly wrote: "The story has distinct possibilities, but they are somewhat dissipated by uneven continuity, indifferent acting of many of the supporting players, and artificial atmosphere. ... The best that can be said of the picture is that it is a mildly entertaining piece of artifice which may get by with the unsophisticated on the popular glamour of the Parisian backgrounds, intriguing title and strong cast."
