= Jean Josipovici =

French screenwriter and film director

- Born: 8 August 1914; Triel-sur-Seine, Seine-et-Oise, France
- Died: 25 June 1992 (aged 77); Rossano, Calabria, Italy
- Occupations: Writer, Director
- Years active: 1945-1971 (film)

Jean Josipovici (1914–1992) was a French screenwriter and film director. The son of a diplomat, he spent much of his youth in Egypt. He was married to the actress Viviane Romance who he directed in three films. After their divorce, he relocated to Italy.

== Biography ==
Jean Josipovici was the son of a diplomat stationed in Cairo, Egypt. He is the father of British writer Gabriel Josipovici.

In 1937, he graduated as Doctor of Philosophy from the Aix-Marseille University, with a thesis on pure introspection: Fragments de vie intérieure. In 1938, in Vence, he met Jean Giono and wrote a book devoted to their correspondence: Lettre à Jean Giono.

In 1948, his comedy Docteur Hinterland was performed in Paris at the Théâtre des Noctambules, directed by Jean Mercure.

In 1954, Jean Josipovici married French actress Viviane Romance. That same year, for the reopening of the Parisian cinema Le Louxor on August 4, 1954, the theater screened Jean Josipovici's newly released film : La Chair et le Diable, starring Viviane Romance.

From the mid-1970s, Jean Josipovici moved to Italy. He published several esoteric works in Italian: Prisons ésotériques (1975), Le Facteur (1976), Catharsis de Marie-Madeleine (1977), De la science obscurantiste (1978), L'Initiation du bonheur (1982), L'Aventure du spirituel Franz Anton Mesmer (1986), Sous le ciel bleu (1987), Suite (1988), L'Alta messe (1990), I limiti della scienza (1990).

== Selected filmography ==
- Dorothy Looks for Love (1945)
- Pity for the Vamps (1956)
- Joe Dakota (1971)

== Bibliography ==
- Philippe Rège. Encyclopedia of French Film Directors, Volume 1. Scarecrow Press, 2009.
