= A Gentleman of the Ring (1932 film) =

1932 film

- Directed by: Robert Bibal
- Written by: Jacques Bousquet (play); Alex Madis
- Produced by: Léon Poirier
- Starring: Geo Laby; Vanda Gréville; Gaston Dubosc
- Music by: André Demurger
- Production company: Films Léon Poirier
- Distributed by: Gaumont-Franco Film-Aubert
- Release date: 21 November 1932
- Running time: 87 minutes
- Country: France
- Language: French

A Gentleman of the Ring (French: Chouchou poids plume) is a 1932 French sports film directed by Robert Bibal and starring Geo Laby, Vanda Gréville and Gaston Dubosc. It is a remake of the 1926 silent film A Gentleman of the Ring.

== Cast ==
- Arcy-Hennery
- Colette Broïdo as Moineau
- Jean-Henri Chambois
- Pierre Darteuil as M. Lormeau
- Marthe Derminy as Mme Lormeau
- Gaston Dubosc as Le comte Brodelet de Surville
- Vanda Gréville as Diana
- Maurice Holtzer
- Geo Laby as Chouchou
- Louis Lorsy
- Germaine Noizet
- André Numès Fils as Philibert
- Georges Papin
- Jacques Pills
- Charles Redgie as Whipple
- Georges Tabet
- Jacques Tarride as Le marquis
- Paul Villé

== Bibliography ==
- Crisp, Colin. Genre, Myth and Convention in the French Cinema, 1929-1939. Indiana University Press, 2002.
