= La route du bagne =

1945 film

La route du bagne (Note: transl. The Path to the Penal Colony), also titled Manon 326, is a 1945 French film directed by Léon Mathot, with Viviane Romance. (Note: Set in the Second French Empire)

It recorded admissions of 2,878,060 in France.

It was shot at the Victorine Studios in Nice.
