= A Woman in the Night =

1943 film

- Directed by: Edmond T. Gréville
- Written by: Jean Bernard-Luc; Jacques Companéez; Pierre Laroche; Jacques Prévert; Pierre Rocher
- Produced by: Hercule Mucchielli
- Starring: Viviane Romance; Georges Flamant; Claude Dauphin
- Cinematography: Léonce-Henri Burel
- Edited by: Anne-Marie Bijou
- Music by: Joseph Kosma; Raoul Moretti
- Production company: Cyrnos Film
- Distributed by: Consortium du Film
- Release date: 13 January 1943
- Running time: 105 minutes
- Country: France
- Language: French

A Woman in the Night (French: Une femme dans la nuit) is a 1943 French drama film directed by Edmond T. Gréville and starring Viviane Romance, Georges Flamant and Claude Dauphin. The film's sets were designed by the art director Jean Douarinou.

== Synopsis ==
Denise, a member of a travelling theatre troupe, flees from her ill-tempered husband. She tries to begin a new life working as a nurse.

== Cast ==
- Viviane Romance as Denise Lorin
- Georges Flamant as Armand Leroy
- Claude Dauphin as François Rousseau
- Henri Guisol as Gustave
- Marion Malville as Nicole Serin-Ledoux
- Andrex as Le charbonnier
- Pierre Stéphen as Campolli
- Lysiane Rey as Lucie Février
- Édouard Delmont as Le père Rousseau
- Yves Deniaud as Maxime
- Jacqueline Hervé as L'ouvreuse
- Jane Marken as Madame Béghin
- Robert Moor as Le baron Hochecorne
- Marcelle Naudia as Madame Serin-Ledoux
- Gaston Orbal as La Douleur
- Félix Oudart as Monsieur Serin-Ledoux
- Gilberte Prévost as La serveuse
- Jacques Tarride as Un comédien
- Vanda Gréville
- Jean-François Martial
- Blanchette Delnar

== Bibliography ==
- Philippe Rège. Encyclopedia of French Film Directors, Volume 1. Scarecrow Press, 2009.
