= The Train of Suicides =

1931 film

- Directed by: Edmond T. Gréville
- Written by: Edmond T. Gréville
- Starring: Vanda Gréville; Georges Colin; Blanche Bernis
- Cinematography: René Guichard
- Edited by: Edmond T. Gréville
- Music by: Raymond Berner
- Production company: Metropole Production
- Release date: 14 August 1931
- Running time: 80 minutes
- Country: France
- Language: French

The Train of Suicides (French: Le train des suicidés) is a 1931 French mystery film directed by Edmond T. Gréville and starring Vanda Gréville, Georges Colin and Blanche Bernis.

== Cast ==
- Vanda Gréville as Betty Gold
- Georges Colin as Joe Crackett
- Blanche Bernis as Mrs. Crackett
- Robert Vidalin as Harry Butler
- Georges Péclet as Fergusson
- François Viguier as Flypaper
- Simone Bourday as Mary Strafford
- Andrée Standart as Lily Bonzo
- Germaine Aussey as L'employée
- Robert Périer as Un jeune homme
- Pedro Elviro as Nobody
- Jean De Sevin as Pussy
- René Ferté as John Sparks
- Raymond Blot as Josuah Brown

== Bibliography ==
- Dudley Andrew. Mists of Regret: Culture and Sensibility in Classic French Film. Princeton University Press, 1995.
