= I Have an Idea =

1934 film

- Directed by: Roger Richebé
- Written by: Roger Richebé
- Based on: Tons of Money by Will Evans and Arthur Valentine
- Produced by: Roger Richebé
- Starring: Raimu; Simone Deguyse; Félix Oudart
- Cinematography: André Dantan; Enzo Riccioni
- Production company: La Société Parisienne du Film Parlant
- Distributed by: Paris Cinéma Location
- Release date: 13 December 1934
- Running time: 100 minutes
- Country: France
- Language: French

I Have an Idea (French: J'ai une idée) is a 1934 French comedy film directed by Roger Richebé and starring Raimu, Simone Deguyse and Félix Oudart. It is an adaptation of the 1922 West End farce Tons of Money by Will Evans and Arthur Valentine. The film's sets were designed by the art director Guy de Gastyne.

== Synopsis ==
In order to avoid his creditors, a man pretends he is dead then poses as his long-lost cousin from Mexico to claim the inheritance. Things are complicated when two other cousins, one of them an imposter, attempt to launch their own claims for the money.

== Cast ==
- Raimu as Aubrey
- Simone Deguyse as Louise
- Georges Morton as Chester
- Félix Oudart as Georges
- Henri Poupon as Henry
- Auguste Mouriès as Edouard
- Léon Nurbel as Gustave
- Christiane Delyne as Daisy
- Charlotte Clasis as La tante Dorothée
- Nane Germon as Norah

== Bibliography ==
- Goble, Alan. The Complete Index to Literary Sources in Film. Walter de Gruyter, 1999.
- Oscherwitz, Dayna & Higgins, MaryEllen. The A to Z of French Cinema. Scarecrow Press, 2009.
- Rège, Philippe. Encyclopedia of French Film Directors, Volume 1. Scarecrow Press, 2009.
