= Pity for the Vamps =

1956 film by Jean Josipovici

- Directed by: Jean Josipovici
- Written by: François Chalais; Robert Chazal; Jean Josipovici; France Roche; Jany Casanova
- Produced by: Jean Josipovici; Viviane Romance
- Starring: Viviane Romance; Geneviève Kervine; Yves Vincent
- Cinematography: Marc Fossard
- Edited by: Paul Cayatte
- Music by: Paul Bonneau
- Production company: Isarfilm
- Distributed by: Les Films Fernand Rivers
- Release date: 19 October 1956
- Running time: 91 minutes
- Country: France
- Language: French

Pity for the Vamps (French: Pitié pour les vamps) is a 1956 French drama film directed by Jean Josipovici and starring Viviane Romance, Geneviève Kervine and Yves Vincent.

== Cast ==
- Viviane Romance as Flora Davis
- Geneviève Kervine as Anne Davis
- Josette Arno as Nicole
- Yves Vincent as André Larcher
- Gabrielle Dorziat a sÉléonore Davis
- Jane Marken as Mme Edith
- Jean Meyer as Pierre
- Roland Bailly as Julien
- Félix Marten as Paul Duke
- Marcel Charvey as Marcel-Marcel
- France Roche as Laure Fontaine
- Jacqueline Noëlle as Yvette
- Eliane Saint-Jean
- Aram Stephan as Le producteur
- Jacques Bézard
- Jean-Daniel Ehrmann
- Jannick Arvel
- Monique Vivin
- Gisèle Pascal as Jany Cristal-Davis
- Gina Manès as L'actrice âgée
- Max Montavon as Le modiste
- Bernard Musson as L'extra au banquet

== Bibliography ==
- Philippe Rège. Encyclopedia of French Film Directors, Volume 1. Scarecrow Press, 2009.
