= Promise to a Stranger =

1942 film

- Directed by: André Berthomieu
- Written by: André Berthomieu; Françoise Giroud; Marc-Gilbert Sauvajon
- Produced by: Suzanne Goosens; Marcel Segard
- Starring: Charles Vanel; Claude Dauphin; Madeleine Robinson
- Cinematography: Georges Benoît
- Edited by: Andrée Danis
- Music by: Georges Derveaux
- Production company: Les Productions Jason
- Distributed by: Gaumont
- Release date: 2 October 1942
- Running time: 90 minutes
- Country: France
- Language: French

Promise to a Stranger (French: Promesse à l'inconnue) is a 1942 French drama film directed by André Berthomieu and starring Charles Vanel, Claude Dauphin and Madeleine Robinson. The film's sets were designed by the art director Robert Giordani.

== Cast ==
- Charles Vanel as Bernard Parker
- Claude Dauphin as Jean Cartier
- Madeleine Robinson as Françoise Parker
- Henri Guisol as Duvernier
- Marcel André as Chancellin
- Alexandre Fabry as Le père Honoraz
- Charlotte Clasis as La mère Honoraz
- Jacques Tarride as Le bijoutier
- Gisèle Alcée as La jeune fille
- Manuel Gary as Le marin du Phocéa
- Lucien Callamand as Bréchard
- Robert Dalban as Le commissaire Andréani
- Pierre Brasseur as Lussac

== Bibliography ==
- Oscherwitz, Dayna & Higgins, MaryEllen. The A to Z of French Cinema. Scarecrow Press, 2009.
- Rège, Philippe. Encyclopedia of French Film Directors, Volume 1. Scarecrow Press, 2009.
