= The Wandering Beast =

1932 film

- Directed by: Marco de Gastyne
- Starring: Gabriel Gabrio; Maurice Maillot; Os-Ko-Mon
- Production company: Pathé-Natan
- Distributed by: Pathé-Natan
- Release date: 13 August 1932
- Running time: 84 minutes
- Country: France
- Language: French

The Wandering Beast (French:La bête errante) is a 1932 French drama film directed by Marco de Gastyne and starring Gabriel Gabrio, Maurice Maillot and Os-Ko-Mon. The film is set in Alaska.

== Cast ==
- Gabriel Gabrio as Gregory
- Maurice Maillot as Hurricane
- Os-Ko-Mon as Villi Kins
- Choura Milena as Flossie
- Jacqueline Torrent as Daisy
- Emile Denois
- Andrews Engelmann
- Alberte Gallé
- Teddy Michaud
- Germaine Michel

== Bibliography ==
- Philippe Rège. Encyclopedia of French Film Directors, Volume 1. Scarecrow Press, 2009.
