= Amour de poche =

- Directed by: Pierre Kast
- Written by: France Roche; Waldemar Kaempffert
- Produced by: Gilbert de Goldschmidt; Alain Poiré; René Thévenet
- Starring: Jean Marais; Geneviève Page
- Cinematography: Ghislain Cloquet
- Edited by: Monique Isnardon; Robert Isnardon
- Music by: Georges Delerue
- Production company: Cila Films
- Distributed by: Gaumont Distribution
- Release date: 6 September 1957
- Running time: 88 minutes
- Country: France
- Language: French
- Box office: 421,270 admissions (France)

Amour de poche (Girl in His Pocket) is a French comedy fantasy film from 1957, directed by Pierre Kast, written by France Roche, starring Jean Marais. The scenario was based on the short story The Diminishing Draft of Waldemar Kaempffert.

== Cast ==
- Jean Marais : Jérôme Nordman
- Geneviève Page : Édith Guérin
- Jean-Claude Brialy : Jean-Loup
- Agnès Laurent : Monette Landry
- Alexandre Astruc : 1er employé des objets trouvés
- Christian-Jaque : 2e employé
- Léo Joannon : 3e employé
- Jean-Pierre Melville : commissar
- Hubert Deschamps : inspector
- Boris Vian : manager of baths
- Alex Joffé : seller of articles of camping
- France Roche : Anne-Lise
- Michel André : secretary in the police office
- Yves Barsacq : student
- Alfred Pasquali : Bataillon
- Jacques Hilling : professor
- Amédée: Maubru
- Régine Lovi : Brigitte
- Joëlle Janin : Solange
- Victor Vicas : the secretary of town hall

== See also ==
- List of films featuring miniature people
