= The Happy Road (1936 film) =

1936 film

- Directed by: Georges Lacombe; Jacques Houssin
- Written by: Michel Arnaud; Jacques Houssin; Amleto Palermi
- Produced by: Andre Hallion
- Starring: Edwige Feuillère; Claude Dauphin; Charlotte Clasis
- Cinematography: Anchise Brizzi; Armand Ratti
- Edited by: Andrée Danis
- Music by: Vittorio Rieti; Georges Van Parys
- Production company: Les Films Epoc
- Distributed by: Les Films Epoc
- Release date: 14 February 1936
- Running time: 75 minutes
- Country: France
- Language: French

The Happy Road (French: La route heureuse) is a 1936 French comedy film directed by Georges Lacombe and Jacques Houssin and starring Edwige Feuillère, Claude Dauphin and Charlotte Clasis. It was shot at the Cines Studios in Rome. The film's sets were designed by the art director Enrico Verdozzi. A separate Italian-language version Amore was also produced.

== Synopsis ==
Suzanne, an orphan raised by her aunt in luxury, marries the owner of a rural pottery. Before long she misses the thrills of city life and abandons her husband. However she soon grows bored and realises how much she wants to be in the country with her husband.

== Cast ==
- Edwige Feuillère as Suzanne
- Claude Dauphin as Paul Venieri
- André Bacqué as Antoine Venieri
- Charlotte Clasis as Marthe Venieri
- Yvonne Rozille as Tante Anna
- Jérôme Goulven as Marco Albert
- Rosine Deréan as Maria
- Maurice Maillot as Laurent
- Nane Chaubert as Louise
- Elio Sannangelo as Le petit Michel

== Bibliography ==
- Bessy, Maurice & Chirat, Raymond. Histoire du cinéma français: 1935-1939. Pygmalion, 1986.
- Crisp, Colin. Genre, Myth and Convention in the French Cinema, 1929-1939. Indiana University Press, 2002.
- Rège, Philippe. Encyclopedia of French Film Directors, Volume 1. Scarecrow Press, 2009.
