= Anne-Marie (film) =

1936 film directed by Raymond Bernard

- Directed by: Raymond Bernard
- Written by: Antoine de Saint-Exupéry
- Produced by: P.J. de Venloo
- Starring: Annabella; Pierre Richard-Willm; Paul Azaïs
- Cinematography: Marc Fossard; Jules Kruger
- Edited by: Raymond Bernard
- Music by: Jacques Ibert
- Production company: Auréa-Films
- Distributed by: Auréa-Films
- Release date: 6 March 1936
- Running time: 109 minutes
- Country: France
- Language: French

Anne-Marie is a 1936 French drama film directed by Raymond Bernard and starring Annabella, Pierre Richard-Willm and Paul Azaïs. If features Annabella as an aspiring young pilot. It was shot at the Saint-Maurice Studios in Paris. The film's sets were designed by the art directors Jean d'Eaubonne and Jean Perrier.

== Synopsis ==
Anne-Marie, a young civil aviation engineer, persuades several of her male colleagues to teach her to fly. Each of them fall slightly in love with her.

== Cast ==
- Annabella as Anne-Marie
- Pierre Richard-Willm as L'inventeur
- Paul Azaïs as Le boxeur
- Pierre Labry as Le paysan
- Abel Jacquin as Le détective
- Christian Gérard as L'amoureux
- Jean Murat as Le penseur
- André Carnège as Le général
- Enrico Glori as Un homme d'affaires
- Odette Talazac as La bonne

== Reception ==
Writing for The Spectator in 1936, Graham Greene gave the film a mildly good review, describing it as "silly but with some amiable qualities". Commenting that "there is very little to be said for this odd plot", and suggesting that "there is no discoverable theme", Greene nevertheless praised Saint-Exupéry's scenario writing and concluded that "it is chiefly worth seeing for [its] exciting and beautifully directed melodramatic climax".

== Bibliography ==
- Jonathan Driskell. The French Screen Goddess: Film Stardom and the Modern Woman in 1930s France. I.B.Tauris, 2015.
