= The Fortune (1931 film) =

1931 film

- Directed by: Jean Hémard
- Written by: Tristan Bernard
- Produced by: Félix Mério
- Starring: Alice Tissot; Simone Deguyse; Claude Dauphin
- Cinematography: René Gaveau; Jean Petit; Georges Volnot
- Music by: Pierre Alberty; Marguerite Monnot; Georges Sellers
- Production company: Films Méric
- Release date: 1931
- Running time: 102 minutes
- Country: France
- Language: French

The Fortune (French: La fortune) is a 1931 French comedy film directed by Jean Hémard and starring Alice Tissot and Simone Deguyse and Claude Dauphin. It was based on the story of the same title by Tristan Bernard.

== Synopsis ==
A young man needs to raise money in order to marry his cousin. However his plan to use a "system" for winning at roulette proves a disaster and he loses everything. Now she fixes her eyes on a wealthy magistrate.

== Cast ==
- Jane Marny as Bérangère
- Alice Tissot as Mlle de Tavères
- Simone Deguyse as L'artiste de cinéma
- Claude Dauphin as Joannis
- Daniel Lecourtois as Badoureau / Studel
- Raymond Rognoni as M. Martelet
- Henri Poupon as Saturnin
- Armand Guy
- Maryanne
- Nitta-Jo as herself on stage
- Gil Roland

== Bibliography ==
- Crisp, Colin. Genre, Myth and Convention in the French Cinema, 1929-1939. Indiana University Press, 2002.
