= Clara de Montargis =

1951 film

- Directed by: Henri Decoin
- Written by: Henri Decoin
- Produced by: Roger Richebé; Bernard Thévenot
- Starring: Ludmilla Tchérina; Michel François; Roland Armontel
- Cinematography: Claude Renoir
- Edited by: Annick Millet
- Music by: René Sylviano
- Production companies: Films Roger Richebé; Sidéral Films
- Distributed by: Cosmic Films
- Release date: 20 June 1951
- Running time: 93 minutes
- Country: France
- Language: French

Clara de Montargis is a 1951 French drama film directed by Henri Decoin and starring Ludmilla Tchérina, Michel François and Roland Armontel. It was made at the Epinay Studios in Paris. The film's sets were designed by the art director René Renoux.

== Cast ==
- Ludmilla Tchérina as Clara
- Michel François as L'ivrogne
- Paul Bisciglia
- Paul Bonifas
- Maurice Chevit as Edouard - le majordome
- Yvonne Claudie
- Espanita Cortez
- Marius David
- Madeleine Delavaivre as Madame Bonacieux
- Guy Derlan
- Catherine Fath
- Maud Lamy
- Robert Le Fort as Le garçon d'hôtel
- René Lestelly
- Henri Marchand
- Jean Meyer as D'Artagnan / Albert
- Félix Paquet
- Jean Piat as Jean-Claude
- Françoise Prévost
- Hélène Rémy as Aramis
- Roland Armontel as l'ivrogne
- Louis Seigner as Le mari de Clara
- Made Siamé
- Jacques Tarride
- Max Tréjean

== Bibliography ==
- Rège, Philippe. Encyclopedia of French Film Directors, Volume 1. Scarecrow Press, 2009.
