= The Murder Man =

1935 film by Tim Whelan

- Directed by: Tim Whelan
- Written by: Screenplay: Tim Whelan; John C. Higgins; Story: Tim Whelan; Guy Bolton
- Produced by: Harry Rapf
- Starring: Spencer Tracy; Virginia Bruce; Lionel Atwill; Harvey Stephens; Robert Barrat
- Cinematography: Lester White
- Edited by: James E. Newcom
- Music by: William Axt
- Production company: Metro-Goldwyn-Mayer
- Distributed by: Loew's Inc.
- Release date: July 12, 1935 (U.S.)
- Running time: 70 minutes
- Country: United States
- Language: English
- Budget: $167,000
- Box office: $546,000

The Murder Man is a 1935 American crime-drama film starring Spencer Tracy, Virginia Bruce, and Lionel Atwill, and directed by Tim Whelan. The picture was Tracy's first film in what would be a twenty-year career with MGM. Tracy plays an investigative reporter who specializes in murder cases. The film is notable as the feature film debut of James Stewart (who had previously appeared in a Shemp Howard comedy short called Art Trouble). Stewart has sixth billing as a reporter named Shorty.

== Plot ==
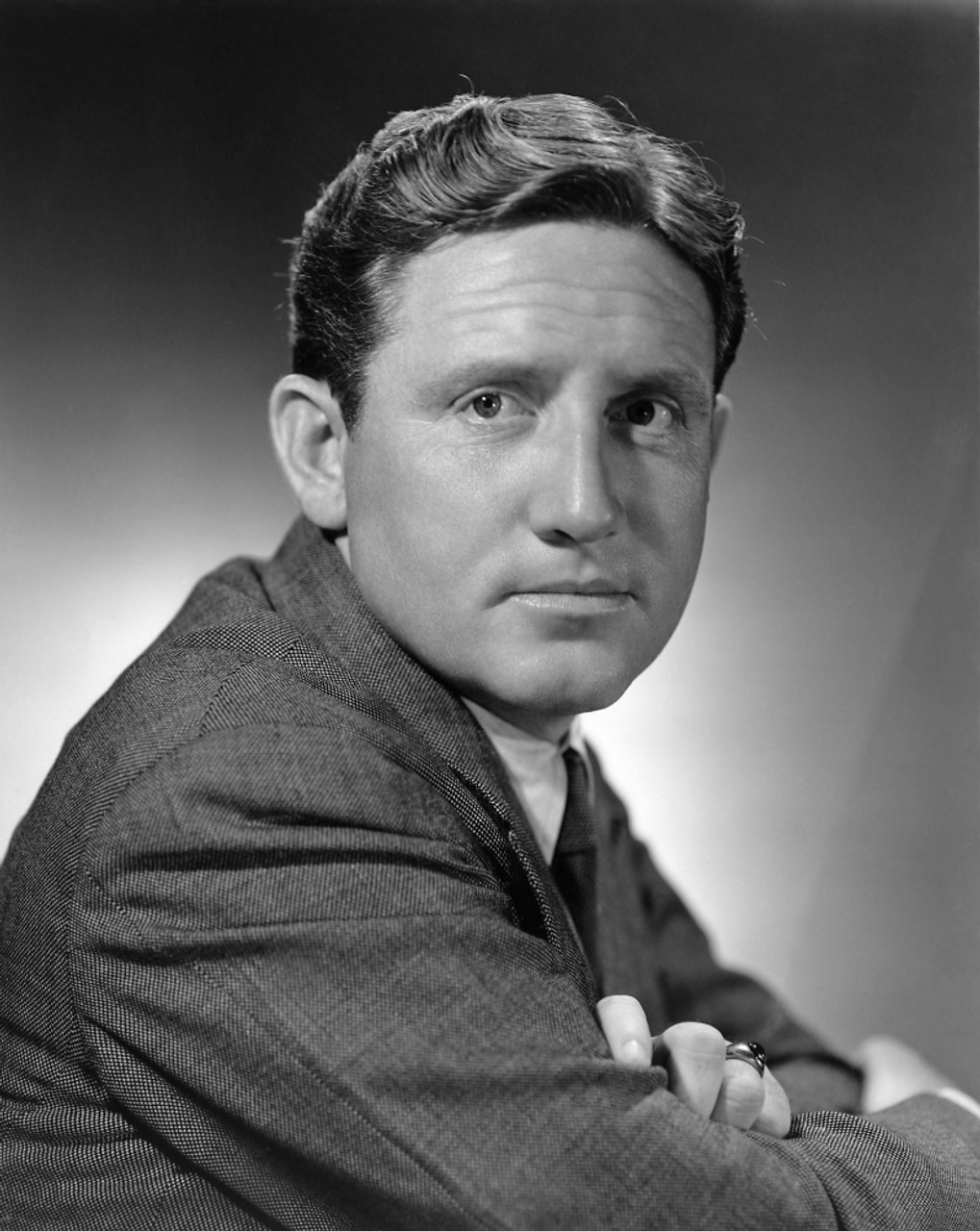
Spencer Tracy in portrait publicizing his new MGM contract, for which The Murder Man was the first film.

Steve Grey is a hotshot New York newspaper reporter specializing in murder. When a crooked businessman named Halford is murdered, Steve pins the blame on the dead man's business partner, Henry Mander, theorizing that Halford was killed by a rifle from a shooting gallery across the street.

Mander is arrested, tried, convicted, and sentenced to death. Steve visits his father, who is depressed because his business has been ruined. The hard-working, hard-drinking Steve is distracted by the Mander case. He is urged by Mary, an advice columnist who loves him, to take some time off. Three months later, away from business concerns, Steve is surprised when he receives word that editor Robbins has arranged an exclusive, eleventh-hour interview with Mander in prison -- and wants Steve to take the assignment. Steve, despite having misgivings, goes to Sing Sing to conduct the interview. Mander is scheduled to die that night, and insists that he did not commit murder. Steve knows who did, but doesn't tell Mander.

With only a short time left before Mander's fatal hour, Steve shocks everyone by confessing to having committed the murder himself, as revenge for Halford and Mander having ruined his father and driven his wife to suicide. Steve's last act is to tell his editor that he's got his biggest story ever.

== Cast ==
- Spencer Tracy as Steve Grey
- Virginia Bruce as Mary
- Lionel Atwill as Capt. Cole
- Harvey Stephens as Henry Mander
- Robert Barrat as Hal Robbins
- James Stewart as Shorty
- William Collier, Sr. as Pop Grey
- Bobby Watson as Carey Booth
- William Demarest as Red Maguire
- John Sheehan as Sweeney
- Lucien Littlefield as Peter Rafferty
- George Chandler as Sol Hertzberger
- Fuzzy Knight as Buck Hawkins
- Louise Henry as Lillian Hopper
- Robert Warwick as Colville
- Joe Irving as Tony
- Ralph Bushman as Pendleton

== Reception ==
Film Daily liked the film: "Spencer Tracy is at his best in this gripping murder mystery story. Tim Whelan, who is also co-author of the original story, has done an excellent job of direction." The Exhibitor applauded the unusual story: "Strong melodrama, with a mystery-murder angle this is different from most similar pictures seen around... Because the picture ends with the hero apparently headed for the electric chair, how audiences will receive this is open to discussion. With Tracy turning in a topnotch performance [and] with good direction, Murder Man deserves support. Must be sold."

Abel Green of Variety was unimpressed, classing the film as a routine B picture with lackluster leads: "The Murder Man will please in the lesser houses. It's not a de luxe flicker and only trade circumstances account for its Broadway advance-of-first-run at the de luxe Capitol, where for obvious reasons this flicker is surrounded by a $10,000 stage show. The film's feminine appeal is virtually nil. Virginia Bruce's presence is solely for whatever mild marquee value she may possess, which, in combination with the similarly limited box-office draft of Spencer Tracy's name in the title role, places the lodestone values at more or less of a minimum. No performance outstanders save William Collier's bit as the old pressroom man. Others competent but undistinguished, yet worthy enough to sustain the so-so story."

Writing for The Spectator, Graham Greene praised Tracy's acting, describing his portrayal of Steve Grey as "as certain as a mathematical formula" and noting that the scene of confrontation between Grey and Henry Mander (portrayed by Harvey Stephens) gave Tracy the chance "of showing the reserve of power behind the ease".

=== Box office ===
According to MGM records the film earned $344,000 in the United States and Canada, and $202,000 elsewhere. resulting in a profit of $184,000.

== See also ==
- 1935 in film
