= Germaine Aussey =

French actress (1909–1979)

Germaine Aussey (born Germaine Adrienne Agassiz, 18 December 1909 in Paris – 15 March 1979 in Geneva) was a French actress who worked with, among others, René Clair, Julien Duvivier, Paul Fejos, Jean Grémillon, Marc Allégret, and Sacha Guitry. She was, from 1940-1945, married to circus impresario John Ringling North. The union ended in divorce.

== Selected filmography ==
- The Train of Suicides (1931)
- Here's Berlin (1932)
- Rouletabille the Aviator (1932)
- Bach the Millionaire (1933)
- The Concierge's Daughters (1934)
- Speak to Me of Love (1935)
- Princesse Tam-Tam (1935)
- Count Obligado (1935)
- Beloved Imposter (1936)
- The Brighton Twins (1936)
- Adventure in Paris (1936)
- Parisian Life (1936)
- The Pearls of the Crown (1937)
- Beyond Love (1940)
- Idyll in Budapest (1941)
