= Merchant of Love =

- Directed by: Edmond T. Gréville
- Written by: Edmond T. Gréville; Henri Jeanson
- Produced by: Gus Ostwalt
- Starring: Jean Galland; Rosine Deréan; Françoise Rosay
- Cinematography: Gosta Kottula
- Edited by: Jean Feyte
- Music by: Jacques Belasco
- Production company: H.O. Films
- Distributed by: Pathé Consortium Cinéma
- Release date: 21 June 1935
- Running time: 80 minutes
- Country: France
- Language: French

Merchant of Love (French: Marchand d'amour) is a 1935 French comedy film directed by Edmond T. Gréville and starring Jean Galland, Rosine Deréan and Françoise Rosay. The film's sets were designed by the art director Pierre Schild.

== Cast ==
- Jean Galland as Jack Stephen
- Rosine Deréan as Lily
- Jacqueline Daix as Mitzi
- Robert Arnoux as Léo
- Françoise Rosay as Clara
- Paul Ollivier as Le commanditaire
- Maurice Maillot as Le jeune premier
- Félix Oudart as Le producteur
- Georges Bever
- Nane Germon
- Enrico Glori
- Fred Marche
- Viviane Romance

== Reception ==
Writing for The Spectator in 1936, Graham Greene gave the film a mildly positive review, characterizing it as "a melodramatic and rather silly tale [...] directed with immense panache and a secret sense of amusement".

== Bibliography ==
- Lucy Mazdon & Catherine Wheatley. Je T’Aime... Moi Non Plus: Franco-British Cinematic Relations. Berghahn Books, 2010.
