= Home on the Range (1935 film) =

1935 film

- Film poster
- Directed by: Arthur Jacobson
- Written by: Ethel Doherty; Grant Garett; Charles Logue
- Based on: Code of the West; 1934 novel by Zane Grey
- Produced by: Harold Hurley
- Starring: Jackie Coogan; Randolph Scott; Evelyn Brent
- Cinematography: William C. Mellor
- Edited by: Jack Dennis
- Music by: Jay Gorney (composer: stock music)
- Production company: Paramount Pictures
- Distributed by: Paramount Pictures
- Release date: February 1, 1935
- Running time: 54 minutes
- Country: United States
- Language: English

Home on the Range is a 1935 American drama film directed by Arthur Jacobson and starring Jackie Coogan, Randolph Scott and Evelyn Brent. Andre Sennwald of the New York Times described the film "to be a strictly makeshift Western". The supporting cast features Dean Jagger, Fuzzy Knight and Ann Sheridan (billed as "Clara Lou Sheridan").

== Cast ==
- Jackie Coogan as Jack Hatfield
- Randolph Scott as Tom Hatfield
- Evelyn Brent as Georgia
- Dean Jagger as Thurman
- Addison Richards as Beady
- Fuzzy Knight as Cracker
- Ann Sheridan as Singer (billed as "Clara Lou Sheridan")
- Howard Wilson as Bill Morris
- Philip Morris as Benson
- Al Hart as Undertaker (as Albert Hart)
- Allen K. Wood as Flash (as Allen Wood)
- Richard Carle as Butts
- Ralph Remley as Brown
- C. L. Sherwood as Shorty (as Clarence Sherwood)
- Francis Sayles as Hotel Clerk
