= The Imberger Mystery =

1935 film

- Directed by: Jacques Séverac
- Written by: Frédéric Boutet; Henri Clerc; Jacques Séverac
- Based on: Le Spectre de M. Imberger by Henry de Gorsse
- Produced by: Edmond Ratisbonne
- Starring: Camille Bert; Simone Deguyse; Jean Galland
- Cinematography: Jean Isnard; Jean-Marie Maillols
- Production company: Compagnie Autonome de Cinématographie
- Distributed by: Cinédis
- Release date: 12 April 1935
- Running time: 82 minutes
- Country: France
- Language: French

The Imberger Mystery (French: Le mystère Imberger) is a 1935 French mystery crime film directed by Jacques Séverac and starring Camille Bert, Simone Deguyse and Jean Galland. It was based on a play by Henry de Gorsse.

== Synopsis ==
Monsieur Imberger discovers that his wife Charlotte is having an affair with his nephew Max. Shortly afterwards he disappears, but there are several reported sightings of him.

== Cast ==
- Camille Bert as Monsieur Imberger
- Simone Deguyse as Charlotte Imberger
- Jean Galland as L'inspecteur Barfin
- Gaston Modot as Le domestique
- André Roanne as Max
- Yvonne Claudie
- Albert Duvaleix
- Georges Prieur
- Georges Térof

== Bibliography ==
- Goble, Alan. The Complete Index to Literary Sources in Film. Walter de Gruyter, 1999.
- Rège, Philippe. Encyclopedia of French Film Directors, Volume 1. Scarecrow Press, 2009.
