= Jean Galland =

French actor

- Born: Jean Charles Pierre Galland; 28 May 1887; Laval, Mayenne; France
- Died: 18 July 1967 (aged 80); Évian-les-Bains, Haute-Savoie; France
- Occupation: Film actor
- Years active: 1932–1969

Jean Galland (28 May 1887 – 18 July 1967) was a French film actor.

== Selected filmography ==
- Paris by Night (1930)
- Fantômas (1932)
- The Oil Sharks (1933)
- The Barber of Seville (1933)
- The Scandal (1934)
- Cease Firing (1934)
- Princesse Tam Tam (1935)
- Whirlpool of Desire (1935)
- Merchant of Love (1935)
- Stradivarius (1935)
- The Imberger Mystery (1935)
- Second Bureau (1935)
- The House of the Spaniard (1936)
- The Unknown (1936)
- 27 Rue de la Paix (1936)
- The Red Dancer (1937)
- Marthe Richard (1937)
- Men of Prey (1937)
- The Novel of Werther (1938)
- Savage Brigade (1939)
- Entente cordiale (1939)
- Threats (1940)
- The Blue Danube (1940)
- Those of the Sky (1941)
- The Lost Woman (1942)
- Private Life (1942)
- The Man Without a Name (1943)
- La Fugue de Monsieur Perle (1952)
- Earrings of Madame de... (1953)
- Marianne of My Youth (1955)
- A Kiss for a Killer (1957)
- The Reluctant Spy (1963)
- The Adventures of Salavin (1964)
