= Arthur Jacobson =

- Born: October 23, 1901; New York City, New York, USA
- Died: October 6, 1993 (aged 91); Woodland Hills, Los Angeles, California, USA
- Other names: Art Jacobson; Artie Jacobson
- Occupation: assistant director
- Years active: 1929-1970

Arthur Jacobson (October 23, 1901 – October 6, 1993) was an American assistant director. While he was an assistant director for most of his films, he was the main director for the 1935 film Home on the Range.

He was nominated at the 6th Academy Awards for the now defunct category of Best Assistant Director.

== Early life ==
As a teenager in New York City, he cleaned lights at Biograph Studios and carted flammable nitrate prints to midtown theaters.

== Career ==
He followed silent actress Clara Bow out to Hollywood, where he began as a cameraman, In 1929, he was part of the transition to talking scenes in Chinatown Nights, assisting director William Wellman. He had a "gift for on-the-fly problem solving" like in The Royal Family of Broadway (1930) where he used a grain forklift to shoot Fredric March running up a staircase. in a 1980 DGA oral history interview, Jacobson said to assist George Seaton in 1947 on Miracle on 34th Street was one of the highlights of his career.

He was active in the Directors Guild of America. starting in 1937, and three decades later served on its National Board.

== Selected filmography ==
- Robinson Crusoe on Mars (1964)
- Papa's Delicate Condition (1963)
- The Country Girl (1954)
- The Bridges at Toko-Ri (1954)
- I Was a Male War Bride (1949)
- Mr. Belvedere Goes to College (1949)
- The Shocking Miss Pilgrim (1947)
- Diamond Horseshoe (1945)
- Crash Dive (1943)
- I Wanted Wings (1941)
- The Big Broadcast of 1936 (1935)
- Home on the Range (1935)
