= Count Obligado =

1935 film

- Directed by: Léon Mathot
- Written by: André Barde (operetta); René Pujol
- Produced by: Alexandre Salkind
- Starring: Georges Milton; Germaine Aussey; Edith Méra
- Cinematography: René Gaveau; Paul Portier
- Edited by: Léonide Moguy
- Music by: Raoul Moretti
- Production company: Eureka Films
- Distributed by: Cinélux
- Release date: 1 February 1935
- Running time: 97 minutes
- Country: France
- Language: French

Count Obligado (French: Le comte Obligado) is a 1935 French comedy film directed by Léon Mathot and starring Georges Milton, Germaine Aussey and Edith Méra. The film's sets were designed by the art director Pierre Schild. It is an adaptation of the 1927 operetta of the same title by André Barde and Raoul Moretti.

== Synopsis ==
Antoine, who works as an Elevator attendant in a major fashion house, inherits thirty thousand francs from a relative. He decides to live in grand style for three days and moves into a luxury hotel. Under the name of Count Obligado, he moves amongst the upper-classes of Paris including the owner of the fashion house who sees him as a wealthy potential investor. As the three days are up, Antoine is exposed for what he really is and dismissed. However, he has the last laugh as he wins the lottery and is able to acquire the business.

== Cast ==
- Georges Milton as Antoine
- Germaine Aussey as Xavière de Miranda
- Jean Aquistapace as Monsieur de Miranda
- Pierre Etchepare as Monsieur d'Amandine
- Edith Méra as Martine de Poligny
- Paulette Dubost as Mitaine
- Lucien Callamand as Le barman
- Jean Rousselière as Robert de Moutiers
- Robert Seller as Monsieur de Poligny

== Bibliography ==
- Bessy, Maurice & Chirat, Raymond. Histoire du cinéma français: 1929-1934. Pygmalion, 1986.
- Crisp, Colin. Genre, Myth and Convention in the French Cinema, 1929-1939. Indiana University Press, 2002.
- Rège, Philippe. Encyclopedia of French Film Directors, Volume 1. Scarecrow Press, 2009.
