= Viviane Romance =

French actress (1912–1991)

- Born: Pauline Ronacher Ortmanns; 4 July 1912; Roubaix, France
- Died: 25 September 1991 (aged 79); Nice, Alpes-Maritimes, France
- Other name: Pauline Ronacher
- Occupation: Actress
- Years active: 1931–1974
- Spouses: Jean Josipovici; Clément Duhour; Georges Flamant

Viviane Romance (born Pauline Ronacher Ortmanns; 4 July 1912 – 25 September 1991) was a French actress.

Viviane Romance was born in Roubaix, France. She began her career as a dancer at the Moulin Rouge in Paris. She was elected Miss Paris of 1930, and she made her film debut in 1931 with a cameo role in La Chienne. Romance caused a small scandal winning Miss Paris because she had a child. She appeared in several films over the next few years, and she made a strong impression in La belle équipe (1936). From this time to the late 1950s, she was regarded as one of France's leading cinematic actresses and played dozens of femme fatales, fallen women (with hearts of gold) and vamps. Her acting roles after 1956 were few, and she retired in 1974.

Romance was offered, and rejected, a Hollywood film contract in the 1930s. She preferred to make films in her native France. However, she also resided for many years in Italy where she made several Italian language films.

She was married three times, including to the actor Georges Flamant and the film director Jean Josipovici, who directed her in three films.

She died in Nice, Alpes-Maritimes, France.

== Selected filmography ==
- Paris' Girls (1929)
- La Chienne (1931)
- He Is Charming (1932)
- L'Épervier (1933)
- Ciboulette (1933)
- Liliom (1934)
- Zouzou (1934)
- Mam'zelle Spahi (1934)
- The Crew (1935)
- Return to Paradise (1935)
- La Bandera (1935)
- Justin de Marseille (1935)
- Princesse Tam-Tam (1935)
- Second Bureau (1935)
- Merchant of Love (1935)
- Les yeux noirs (1935)
- La belle équipe (1936)
- The Club of Aristocrats (1937)
- The Kiss of Fire (1937)
- A Man to Kill (1937)
- Street of Shadows (1937)
- The Strange Monsieur Victor (1938)
- Women's Prison (1938)
- Gibraltar (1938)
- The Puritan (1938)
- Sirocco (1938)
- Angelica (1939)
- The White Slave (1939)
- Midnight Tradition (1939)
- Vénus aveugle (1941)
- Carmen (1942)
- A Woman in the Night (1943)
- La route du bagne (1945)
- Box of Dreams (1945)
- Panic (Panique) (1946)
- The Queen's Necklace (1946)
- Crossroads of Passion (1948)
- Maya (1949)
- Passion (1951)
- Heart of the Casbah (1952)
- The Seven Deadly Sins (1952)
- Women Are Angels (1952)
- Man, Beast and Virtue (1953)
- Dangerous Turning (1954)
- Pleasures and Vices (1955)
- The Affair of the Poisons (1955)
- Pity for the Vamps (1956)
- Any Number Can Win (1963)
- Nada (1974)
