= Noose (1948 film) =

- US theatrical release poster
- Directed by: Edmond T. Gréville
- Written by: Richard Llewellyn (play and screenplay)
- Produced by: Edward Dryhurst
- Starring: Carole Landis; Derek Farr; Joseph Calleia; Stanley Holloway; Nigel Patrick
- Cinematography: Hone Glendining
- Edited by: David Newhouse
- Music by: Charles Williams
- Production company: Associated British Picture Corporation
- Distributed by: Pathé Pictures
- Release date: 28 September 1948
- Running time: 95 minutes
- Country: United Kingdom
- Language: English
- Budget: £136,500
- Box office: £163,159 (UK)

Noose (U.S. title: The Silk Noose) is a 1948 British comedy crime film, directed by Edmond T. Gréville and starring Carole Landis, Joseph Calleia and Derek Farr. It was written by Richard Llewellyn based on his play of the same title. The film is part of the cycle of Britain spiv films produced between 1945 and 1950.

== Plot ==
Set in then contemporary post-war London, Noose is the story of black market racketeers who face attempts to bring them to justice by an American fashion journalist, her ex-army fiancé and a gang of honest toughs from a local gym. The normally gentlemanly and urbane Nigel Patrick is cast as a cockney spiv.

The gangs hang around Bason's Gymnasium and Sugiani's nightclub, The Blue Moon. Sugiani has worked his way up from the gutter since arriving in Britain from Italy.

== Cast ==
- Carole Landis as Linda Medbury
- Joseph Calleia as Sugiani
- Derek Farr as Captain Jumbo Holle
- Stanley Holloway as Inspector Rendall
- Nigel Patrick as Bar ("Gorm") Gorman
- John Slater as Pudd'n Bason
- Edward Rigby as Slush
- Leslie Bradley as Basher
- Reginald Tate as the editor
- Hay Petrie as the barber
- John Salew as Greasey Anderson
- Ruth Nixon as Annie Foss
- Carol van Derman as Marcia Lane

== Production ==
It was shot at Teddington Studios with sets designed by the art director Bernard Robinson.

== Reception ==
=== Box office ===
Trade papers called the film a "notable box office attraction" in British cinemas in 1948. As of 1 April 1950 the film earned net box office receipts in the UK of £498,800 and distributor's gross receipts of £119,229 of which £74,918 went to the producer.

=== Critical ===
The Monthly Film Bulletin wrote: "Based on the play of the same name, the film moves at a smart pace from start to finish. The characterisation is sure, there is much humour, and a large cast responds well to alert direction. Of individual performances, that of Nigel Patrick stands out with startling effect. Joseph Calleia is suitably ruthless as the Black Market chief, and Hay Petrie makes a brief but sinister appearance as a barber. Carole Landis is both clever and attractive as Linda and a delectable study in dead-pan technique comes from Carol Van Derman."

Kine Weekly wrote: "Played for laughs as well as thrills by a perfectly balanced cast, and dressed to kill, it makes every post a winning one in its race to a spectacular, if slightly facetious, 'crime does not pay' climax. The masses will eat it. Capital British 'thick ear.'"

Variety wrote: "Depending more on characterization than on dramatic values, pic is noted for the excellent types who portray the underworld thugs. Joseph Calleia as Sugiani; Nigel Patrick as the irrepressible Bar Gorman, and Hay Petrie as the murderer, help lend color to the production. The late Carole Landis is attractive as the newspaper woman who stumbles on a scoop and makes trouble for Sugiani."

In The Radio Times Guide to Films Dick Fiddy gave the film 3/5 stars, writing: "This is a sterling slice of British film noir, starring American sex symbol Carole Landis. As the fashion journalist who gets mixed up in the murky underworld of London's black market, Landis bravely goes up against spivs and wide-boy racketeers in this well-made little thriller. While blonde bombshell Landis provides the glamour, the best performance is by Nigel Patrick as the fast-talking, charismatic villain."
