= Simone Deguyse =

French actress (1910–1985)

- Born: 27 October 1910; Neuilly-Plaisance, Seine-Saint-Denis, France
- Died: 22 June 1985 (aged 74); Nice, Alpes-Maritimes, France
- Occupation: Actress
- Years active: 1931-1947 (film)

Simone Deguyse (1910–1985) was a French stage and film actress. On stage she appeared in a number of operettas and comedies.

== Selected filmography ==
- The Fortune (1931)
- Buridan's Donkey (1932)
- Orange Blossom (1932)
- I Have an Idea (1934)
- Your Smile (1934)
- La jeune fille d'une nuit (1934)
- Une femme chipée (1934
- The Imberger Mystery (1935)
- The Man of the Hour (1937)
- False Identity (1947)

== Bibliography ==
- Goble, Alan. The Complete Index to Literary Sources in Film. Walter de Gruyter, 1999.
- Kermabon, Jacques. Pathé: premier empire du cinéma. Centre Georges Pompidou, 1994.
- Lartigue, Jacques-Henri. Les Femmes Aux Cigarettes. Viking Press, 1980.
