= Edmond T. Gréville =

French film director and screenwriter (1906–1966)

Edmond T. Gréville (born Edmond Gréville Thonger; 20 June 1906 – 26 May 1966) was a French film director and screenwriter. He was married to the actress Vanda Gréville.

== Career ==
Gréville began his career as a film journalist and critic. In parallel with a few acting performances in some silent films and in the first talkie of René Clair, Sous les toits de Paris (1930), he directed his first short films. His first experience of directing had been on the shooting of Abel Gance's Napoléon in 1927. He had then worked as an assistant director, notably on the English film Piccadilly, L'Arlésienne (directed by Jacques de Baroncelli), Augusto Genina's Miss Europe (with Louise Brooks) and Abel Gance's La Fin du Monde.

Between 1930 and 1940 he directed several French films:

- Le Train des suicidés (1931)
- Remous (1934) with Françoise Rosay, a social-realist film on the sensitive sexual issue of impotence, and released in the US in November 1939 under title Whirlpool of Desire after a legal battle over U.S. censorship
- Two comedy musical films Princesse Tam Tam (1935) with Josephine Baker, and Gypsy Melody (1936), with Lupe Vélez.

In Britain again, he filmed Under Secret Orders (1937) with Dita Parlo and John Loder (1937), the English-language version of G. W. Pabst's Mademoiselle Docteur. Gréville also directed Menaces (1938) with Mireille Balin and Erich von Stroheim, with von Stroheim playing an Austrian refugee who commits suicide following the Anschluss. With a heavy atmosphere charged with eroticism which characterizes his films, Gréville imposed his independence and original style on the cinema of the time.

He stopped directing films during the Second World War and the Occupation - xenophobia and anti-Semitism ruined or put a stop to some careers, among film-makers those of Léonide Moguy and Pierre Chenal for example, both French Jews, and the half-British Gréville, and took away production and distribution companies belonging to Jews like the father and son distributors Siriztky.

In 1948 he made a film on the subject of resistance and collaboration in the Anglo-Dutch film Niet tevergeefs/But Not in Vain. The same year he made a film with Carole Landis, Noose, released in the U.S. as The Silk Noose. In House on the Waterfront (1954) he directed Jean Gabin as a captain confronted by an unscrupulous smuggler and torn by his love for a young woman who is also loved by a younger man.

In Gréville's last years he made Beat Girl (1959) with Adam Faith and a horror film The Hands of Orlac (1960) with Mel Ferrer. His last film was L'Accident (1963) with Magali Noël based on a Frédéric David novel.

== Personal life ==
Gréville was born in June 1906 in Nice, France, the adopted son of Franco-British parents. In May 1966, he died in hospital in Nice, thought to be the result of complications following a car accident. It was subsequently discovered through the 23andMe genetic testing of his daughter and grandson in 2017, that he was Ashkenazim Jewish, likely from the area of Odessa, based on the present whereabouts of his closest genetic relations today. Family speculation suggests that his parents fled the 1905 Russian pogrom to Marseilles, where he may have been discovered in the Nice hospital his English father, a Salvation Army colonel and Protestant pastor, was associated with. His true origin and that of his biological parents, remains a mystery.

== Selected filmography ==
- The Train of Suicides (1931)
- The Triangle of Fire (1932)
- Merchant of Love (1935)
- Gypsy Melody (1936)
- Brief Ecstasy (1937)
- Secret Lives (1937)
- What a Man! (1938)
- Threats (1940)
- A Woman in the Night (1943)
- Dorothy Looks for Love (1945)
- But Not in Vain (1948)
- Noose (1948)
- The Other Side of Paradise (1953)
- House on the Waterfront (1955)
- Guilty? (1956)
- Beat Girl (1960)
- The Accident (1963)
