= Princess Tam Tam =

1935 film directed by Edmond T. Greville

- Danish film poster
- Directed by: Edmond T. Greville
- Written by: Pepito Abatino (also art director)
- Screenplay by: Yves Mirande
- Produced by: Arys Nissotti
- Starring: Josephine Baker; Albert Prejean
- Cinematography: G. Benoit
- Edited by: J. Feyte
- Music by: Dallin; Grenet; Goehr; Al Romans
- Production company: Arys Production
- Distributed by: DI CI MO
- Release date: 2 November 1935 (France)
- Running time: 77 minutes
- Language: French

Princess Tam Tam (French: Princesse Tam Tam) is a 1935 French black-and-white film which stars Josephine Baker as a local Tunisian girl who is educated and then introduced to Parisian high society. Baker sings two songs, "Dream Ship" and "Neath the Tropical Blue Skies", in the film, and dances a number of times.

== Plot ==
Frustrated writer Max de Mirecourt (Albert Prejean) goes to Tunisia in search of inspiration for his next novel. While there, Max lives in a villa with his servant Dar (Georges Peclet) and ghostwriter Coton (Robert Arnoux). Despite Coton's help, Max is unable to come up with any good story ideas. However, he soon meets a local girl named Alwina (Josephine Baker) whose personality intrigues him so greatly that he invents a character based on her for his newest (and 'most exciting') novel. His relation with Alwina serves a dual purpose in that it also angers (or at least highly annoys) his wife Lucie (Germaine Aussey) who has been flirting with the Maharaja of Datane (Jean Galland) back in Paris. Max takes Alwina under his wing and teaches her the manners and social graces of a high-society princess. He then whisks her away to Paris and presents her as Princess Tam Tam from faraway Africa.

Lucie is further enraged by all the attention that Alwina receives, and after a friend sees Alwina dance provocatively in the sailors' bar, Lucie calls upon her Maharaja to craft a plan which will destroy her husband's relation with "the princess." The Maharaja throws a grand party, inviting the upper crust of Parisian society. Alwina is unable to resist the exotic music, and promptly joins the large, staged dance number, embarrassing Max – until he realizes that the entire audience is on their feet, applauding Alwina. Lucie is furious.

Lucie and Max forgive each other in the end and fall in love again, Alwina returns to Tunisia after the frustrating realization that, as the Maharaja puts it, "Some windows face to the West, and the others to the East." Ultimately, however, the entire European affair is revealed to be little more than an enactment of Max's novel-in-progress. Alwina never does go to Europe, and the primary events of the film are simply a staging of how Max has imagined them. Alwina is given Max's Tunisian estate, and Max's new novel is a success. The title of his new work is "Civilisation." When asked about Alwina while back in Europe, Max states that she is "better where she is".

The film closes with a scene of Alwina and Dar back in Tunisia with their newborn child, with farm animals strewn about Max's mansion. In the final shot, a donkey eats the title page of "Civilisation" off Max's (now Alwina's) floor.

== Cast ==
- Josephine Baker as Alwina
- Albert Prejean as Max de Mirecourt
- Robert Arnoux as Coton
- Germaine Aussey as Lucie de Mirecourt
- Georges Peclet as Dar
- Viviane Romance as Lucie's Friend
- Jean Galland as Maharajah of Datane

Cast note:

- The Comedian Harmonists, a sought-after German act, recorded "Sous le ciel d'Afrique" with Josephine Baker in September 1935, but they are not the quartet that sings in the movie. The recording with Baker was one of the first records made by the three Jewish members of the Comedian Harmonists after the split of the original group. The "Aryan" members remained in Berlin, the Jewish ones went to Paris, then to Vienna. Both groups supplemented themselves with three new members.

== Production ==
The African scenes in Princess Tam Tam were filmed on location in Tunisia. The Eastman House restored the film in 1989.

== Reception ==
Although the film had a premiere in New York City, the Hollywood censors of the Hays Office refused to pass the film, which prevented it from being shown in the most theatres in rest of the country, although it did play independent theatres which catered to African-American audiences.

== Poster ==
On 4 February 2010, Swann Galleries set an auction record for Svend Koppel's poster for the film at $9,000. The image, "Josephine Baker / Prinsesse Tam-Tam", from 1935, was later used by the United States Postal Service on a postage stamp.
