= 1933 in film =

The year 1933 in film involved many significant events, including the world premiere of Merian C. Cooper's masterpiece King Kong. It also involved the release of three of Busby Berkeley's greatest backstage musicals: 42nd Street, Gold Diggers of 1933, and Footlight Parade. However, the Academy Award for Best Picture went to the screen version of Noël Coward's musical extravaganza Cavalcade.

== Events ==
The Film Daily Yearbook listed the following as the ten leading news events of the year in North America.

- The motion picture industry goes under the National Recovery Administration code.
- Receivers appointed for Paramount Publix, RKO, and Fox Theatres.
- The film industry takes an eight-week salary cut.
- The Sirovich bill for a sweeping probe of film industry is defeated.
- John D. Hertz withdraws as Paramount Publix finance chairman, and Adolph Zukor appoints George J. Schaefer as general manager.
- Sidney Kent effects financial reorganization of Fox Film Corp., averting receivership, and company shows its first profit since 1930.
- Ruling of the United States District Court for the District of Delaware creates an "open market" for sound equipment.
- Nathan Nathanson regains control of Famous Players Canadian circuit.
- Darryl F. Zanuck quits Warner Bros-First National and with Joseph M. Schenck forms Twentieth Century Pictures, turning out eight productions in the first four months, beginning with The Bowery.
- Harold B. Franklin resigns as president of RKO Theaters.

Other notable events include:

- January 11 – Radio City Music Hall in New York City starts screening motion pictures.
- January 20 – The film Ecstasy premieres in Czechoslovakia; its foreign distribution presents many difficulties as 18-year-old actress Hedy Lamarr is shown naked in it.
- March – German director Fritz Lang is informed by Joseph Goebbels that the release of Lang's crime-thriller The Testament of Dr. Mabuse will not be permitted by the newly formed Reich Ministry of Public Enlightenment and Propaganda. The German-language premiere takes place on April 21 in Budapest, Hungary. On April 20, Lang divorces his wife, the film's writer Thea von Harbou, and on July 31, he leaves Germany permanently, initially settling in Paris, France.
- March 2 – King Kong premieres at Radio City Music Hall in New York City; opening weekend ticket sales are estimated at US$90,000.
- March 9 – Punyal na Ginto (The Golden Dagger), the first Filipino-language film made in the Philippines, is released.
- March 11 – 42nd Street sparks a major comeback for the musical genre.
- March 15 – Australian actor Errol Flynn makes his screen debut in the lead role of Fletcher Christian in In the Wake of the Bounty.
- June 6 – Chemical company executive Richard Hollingshead opens a drive-in theater near Camden, New Jersey, according to his U.S patent granted on May 16. The first film shown is Wives Beware.
- September 6 – Daily Variety, a trade newspaper, is published for the first time in Hollywood.
- December 29 – Fred Astaire and Ginger Rogers appear on screen together for the first time in Flying Down to Rio.
- Ang Aswang, the first sound film made in the Philippines, is released.
- Makata At Paraluman (The Poet and the Maiden), the first talking film in vernacular made in the Philippines, is released.
- The British Film Institute is founded.
- The GPO Film Unit is established in the United Kingdom under John Grierson, taking over responsibility for documentary film making from the Empire Marketing Board.
- Metro-Goldwyn-Mayer (MGM) once again expresses interest in The Wizard of Oz books for a series of animated shorts. But once again, the studio fails to make a deal with the estate of writer L. Frank Baum.
- The Private Life of Henry VIII becomes the first British film to win an American Academy Award. Featured actor Charles Laughton wins the 1933 Academy Award for Best Actor for his performance. The film is the first British production to be nominated for the Academy Award for Best Picture.
- The book Upton Sinclair Presents William Fox is published, detailing what William Fox considers to be the conspiracy that forced him from control of Fox Film in 1930.

== Academy Awards ==
The 6th Academy Awards were held on March 16, 1934, at The Ambassador Hotel in Los Angeles. They were hosted by Will Rogers, who also presented all of the awards. This was the last time that the Oscars' eligibility period was spread over two different calendar years, creating the longest time frame for which films could be nominated: the seventeen months from August 1, 1932, to December 31, 1933.

Most nominations: Cavalcade (Fox Film); A Farewell to Arms (Paramount Pictures) and Lady for a Day (Columbia Pictures) – 4

Major awards:

- Best Picture: Cavalcade – Fox Film
- Best Director: Frank Lloyd – Cavalcade
- Best Actor: Charles Laughton – The Private Life of Henry VIII
- Best Actress: Katharine Hepburn – Morning Glory

Most Awards: Cavalcade – 3 (Outstanding Production; Best Director; Best Art Direction)

== Top-grossing films (U.S.) ==
The top ten films released in 1933 by box office earnings in North America are as follows:

Highest-grossing films of 1933
Rank	Title	Distributor	Domestic rentals
1	Roman Scandals	United Artists	$2,443,000
2	I'm No Angel	Paramount	$2,250,000
3	Gold Diggers of 1933	Warner Bros.	$2,202,000
4	She Done Him Wrong	Paramount	$2,200,000
5	The Bowery	United Artists/Twentieth Century	$2,000,000
6	Tugboat Annie	MGM	$1,917,000
7	Footlight Parade	Warner Bros.	$1,601,000
8	Dancing Lady	MGM	$1,490,000
9	42nd Street	Warner Bros.	$1,438,000
10	Dinner at Eight	MGM	$1,398,000

== Notable films ==
United States unless stated

=== # ===
- 42nd Street, directed by Lloyd Bacon, starring Warner Baxter, Bebe Daniels, George Brent, Ruby Keeler, Una Merkel and Dick Powell

=== A ===
- Adorable, directed by William Dieterle, starring Janet Gaynor
- After Tonight, directed by George Archainbaud, starring Constance Bennett and Gilbert Roland
- Alice in Wonderland, directed by Norman Z. McLeod, starring Charlotte Henry, Richard Arlen, Gary Cooper, W. C. Fields, Cary Grant and Jack Oakie
- Ann Vickers, directed by John Cromwell, starring Irene Dunne and Walter Huston

=== B ===
- Baby Face, directed by Alfred E. Green, starring Barbara Stanwyck and George Brent
- Beauty for Sale, directed by Richard Boleslawski, starring Madge Evans, Alice Brady and Una Merkel
- Bed of Roses, directed by Gregory La Cava, starring Constance Bennett and Joel McCrea
- A Bedtime Story, directed by Norman Taurog, starring Maurice Chevalier and Helen Twelvetrees
- Berkeley Square, directed by Frank Lloyd, starring Leslie Howard
- Bitter Sweet, directed by Herbert Wilcox, starring Anna Neagle – (GB)
- The Bitter Tea of General Yen, directed by Frank Capra, starring Barbara Stanwyck and Nils Asther
- Blood Money, directed by Rowland Brown, starring George Bancroft
- Bombshell, directed by Victor Fleming, starring Jean Harlow, Lee Tracy, Frank Morgan, Franchot Tone, Pat O'Brien and Una Merkel
- The Bowery, directed by Raoul Walsh, starring Wallace Beery, George Raft, Jackie Cooper and Fay Wray
- Bureau of Missing Persons, directed by Roy Del Ruth, starring Bette Davis, Lewis Stone, Pat O'Brien and Glenda Farrell
- By Candlelight, directed by James Whale

=== C ===
- Cash, directed by Zoltan Korda, starring Robert Donat and Edmund Gwenn – (GB)
- Cavalcade, directed by Frank Lloyd, starring Diana Wynyard and Clive Brook
- Convention City (lost), directed by Archie Mayo, starring Joan Blondell, Adolphe Menjou, Dick Powell and Mary Astor
- Counsellor at Law, directed by William Wyler, starring John Barrymore and Bebe Daniels

=== D ===
- Dancing Lady, directed by Robert Z. Leonard, starring Joan Crawford, Clark Gable and Franchot Tone
- Daybreak (Tiānmíng), directed by Sun Yu – (China)
- Deluge, directed by Felix E. Feist, starring Sidney Blackmer
- The Deserter (Dezertir), directed by Vsevolod Pudovkin – (U.S.S.R.)
- Design for Living, directed by Ernst Lubitsch, starring Fredric March, Gary Cooper and Miriam Hopkins
- The Devil's Brother, directed by Hal Roach, starring Laurel and Hardy
- Dick Turpin, directed by Victor Hanbury, starring Victor McLaglen – (GB)
- Dinner at Eight, directed by George Cukor, starring Marie Dressler, John Barrymore, Wallace Beery, Jean Harlow, Lionel Barrymore, Lee Tracy and Billie Burke
- Doctor Bull, directed by John Ford, starring Will Rogers
- Don Quixote, directed by G.W. Pabst, starring Feodor Chaliapin – (France/GB)
- Dora's Dunking Doughnuts, directed by Harry Edwards, starring Shirley Temple
- Dragnet Girl (Hijōsen no Onna), directed by Yasujirō Ozu, starring Kinuyo Tanaka – (Japan)
- Duck Soup, directed by Leo McCarey, starring the Marx Brothers

=== E ===
- The Eagle and the Hawk, directed by Stuart Walker, starring Fredric March, Cary Grant, Carole Lombard and Jack Oakie
- Ecstasy (Extase), directed by Gustav Machatý, starring Hedy Lamarr – (Czechoslovakia)
- The Emperor Jones, directed by Dudley Murphy, starring Paul Robeson
- Employees' Entrance, directed by Roy Del Ruth, starring Warren William and Loretta Young
- Ever in My Heart, directed by Archie Mayo, starring Barbara Stanwyck, Otto Kruger and Ralph Bellamy
- Ex-Lady, directed by Robert Florey, starring Bette Davis and Gene Raymond

=== F ===
- Fast Workers, directed by Tod Browning, starring John Gilbert
- The Flower of Hawaii (Die Blume von Hawaii), directed by Richard Oswald – (Germany)
- Flying Down to Rio, directed by Thornton Freeland, starring Dolores del Río, Gene Raymond, Ginger Rogers and Fred Astaire
- Footlight Parade, directed by Lloyd Bacon, starring James Cagney, Joan Blondell, Ruby Keeler and Dick Powell
- Friday the Thirteenth, directed by Victor Saville, starring Jessie Matthews – (GB)

=== G ===
- Gabriel Over the White House, directed by Gregory La Cava, starring Walter Huston and Franchot Tone
- Ganga Bruta (Brutal Gang), directed by Humberto Mauro, starring Durval Bellini and Déa Selva (Brazil)
- The Ghost Camera, directed by Bernard Vorhaus, starring Ida Lupino and John Mills – (GB)
- The Ghoul, directed by T. Hayes Hunter, starring Boris Karloff and Cedric Hardwicke – (GB)
- Going Hollywood, directed by Raoul Walsh, starring Marion Davies, Bing Crosby and Patsy Kelly
- Gold Diggers of 1933, directed by Mervyn LeRoy, starring Warren William, Joan Blondell, Ruby Keeler, Dick Powell and Ginger Rogers
- The Good Companions, directed by Victor Saville, starring Jessie Matthews, Edmund Gwenn and John Gielgud – (GB)
- Goodbye Again, directed by Michael Curtiz, starring Warren William and Joan Blondell

=== H ===
- Hallelujah, I'm a Bum, directed by Lewis Milestone, starring Al Jolson and Frank Morgan
- Hard to Handle, directed by Mervyn LeRoy, starring James Cagney
- Heroes for Sale, directed by William A. Wellman, starring Richard Barthelmess, Aline MacMahon and Loretta Young
- Hold Your Man, directed by Sam Wood, starring Jean Harlow and Clark Gable
- The House on 56th Street, directed by Robert Florey, starring Kay Francis, Ricardo Cortez and Gene Raymond
- The House of Dora Green (Salon Dora Green), directed by Henrik Galeen, starring Mady Christians – (Germany)
- The Hymn of Leuthen (Der Choral von Leuthen), directed by Carl Froelich, starring Otto Gebühr – (Germany)

=== I ===
- I Loved a Woman, directed by Alfred E. Green, starring Edward G. Robinson and Kay Francis
- I'm No Angel, directed by Wesley Ruggles, starring Mae West (the writer) and Cary Grant
- In the Wake of the Bounty, directed by Charles Chauvel, starring Errol Flynn – (Australia)
- International House, directed by A. Edward Sutherland, starring W. C. Fields, George Burns, Gracie Allen and Bela Lugosi
- The Invisible Man, directed by James Whale, starring Gloria Stuart and Claude Rains
- It's Great to Be Alive, directed by Alfred L. Werker, starring Gloria Stuart

=== K ===
- Każdemu wolno kochać (Anybody Can Love), directed by Mieczysław Krawicz – (Poland)
- The Kennel Murder Case, directed by Michael Curtiz, starring William Powell and Mary Astor
- The Keyhole, directed by Michael Curtiz, starring Kay Francis, George Brent and Glenda Farrell
- King Kong, directed by Merian C. Cooper, starring Fay Wray and Robert Armstrong
- King of the Jungle, directed by H. Bruce Humberstone and Max Marcin, starring Buster Crabbe

=== L ===
- Ladies They Talk About, directed by Howard Bretherton and William Keighley, starring Barbara Stanwyck and Lyle Talbot
- Lady for a Day, directed by Frank Capra, starring Warren William, May Robson and Glenda Farrell
- Lady Killer, directed by Roy Del Ruth, starring James Cagney and Mae Clarke
- Laughter in Hell, directed by Edward L. Cahn, starring Pat O'Brien and Gloria Stuart
- Liebelei, directed by Max Ophüls – (Germany)
- Life Is a Dog (Život je pes), directed by Martin Frič, starring Hugo Haas – (Czechoslovakia)
- Little Toys (Xiáo wǎnyì), directed by Sun Yu – (China)
- Little Women, directed by George Cukor, starring Katharine Hepburn, Joan Bennett and Jean Parker
- Looking Forward, directed by Clarence Brown, starring Lionel Barrymore and Lewis Stone
- Lot in Sodom, directed by James Sibley Watson
- Loyalties, directed by Basil Dean, starring Basil Rathbone – (GB)

=== M ===
- Man's Castle, directed by Frank Borzage, starring Spencer Tracy, Loretta Young and Glenda Farrell
- The Mayor of Hell, directed by Archie Mayo, starring James Cagney
- Men Must Fight, directed by Edgar Selwyn, starring Diana Wynyard, Lewis Stone and Phillips Holmes
- Midnight Club, directed by Alexander Hall and George Somnes, starring George Raft and Clive Brook
- Midnight Mary, directed by William A. Wellman, starring Loretta Young, Ricardo Cortez, Franchot Tone and Una Merkel
- The Midnight Patrol, directed by Lloyd French, starring Laurel and Hardy
- Money for Speed, directed by Bernard Vorhaus, starring John Loder and Ida Lupino – (GB)
- The Monkey's Paw (lost), directed by Ernest B. Schoedsack
- Morning Glory, directed by Lowell Sherman, starring Katharine Hepburn, Douglas Fairbanks Jr. and Adolphe Menjou
- Mr. Skitch, directed by James Cruze, starring Will Rogers and ZaSu Pitts
- Mystery of the Wax Museum, directed by Michael Curtiz, starring Lionel Atwill, Fay Wray and Glenda Farrell

=== O ===
- Okraina (Outskirts), directed by Boris Barnet – (U.S.S.R.)
- Oliver Twist, directed by William J. Cowen, starring Dickie Moore
- One Sunday Afternoon, directed by Stephen Roberts, starring Gary Cooper, Fay Wray and Neil Hamilton
- Only Yesterday, directed by John M. Stahl, starring Margaret Sullavan, John Boles and Billie Burke
- Our Betters, directed by George Cukor, starring Constance Bennett, Anita Louise and Gilbert Roland

=== P ===
- Parachute Jumper, directed by Alfred E. Green, starring Douglas Fairbanks Jr. and Bette Davis
- Passing Fancy (Dekigokoro), directed by Yasujirō Ozu – (Japan)
- Peg o' My Heart, directed by Robert Z. Leonard, starring Marion Davies
- Penthouse, directed by W. S. Van Dyke, starring Warner Baxter and Myrna Loy
- Perfect Understanding, directed by Cyril Gardner, starring Gloria Swanson and Laurence Olivier – (GB)
- Pick-Up, directed by Marion Gering, starring Sylvia Sidney and George Raft
- Picture Snatcher, directed by Lloyd Bacon, starring James Cagney and Ralph Bellamy
- Pilgrimage, directed by John Ford, starring Henrietta Crosman
- The Power and the Glory, directed by William K. Howard, starring Spencer Tracy and Colleen Moore
- The Private Life of Henry VIII, directed by Alexander Korda, starring Charles Laughton and Merle Oberon – (GB)
- The Prizefighter and the Lady, directed by W. S. Van Dyke, starring Myrna Loy, Max Baer, Primo Carnera, Jack Dempsey and Walter Huston
- Professional Sweetheart, directed by William A. Seiter, starring Ginger Rogers, Norman Foster and ZaSu Pitts

=== Q-R ===
- Queen Christina, directed by Rouben Mamoulian, starring Greta Garbo, John Gilbert and Lewis Stone
- Refugees (Flüchtlinge), directed by Gustav Ucicky, starring Hans Albers and Käthe von Nagy – (Germany)
- Roman Scandals, directed by Frank Tuttle, starring Eddie Cantor, Ruth Etting and Gloria Stuart

=== S ===
- S.O.S. Eisberg (S.O.S. Iceberg), directed by Arnold Fanck, starring Leni Riefenstahl – (Germany)
- Secret of the Blue Room, directed by Kurt Neumann, starring Lionel Atwill, Gloria Stuart, Paul Lukas and Edward Arnold
- Secrets, directed by Frank Borzage, starring Mary Pickford and Leslie Howard
- She Done Him Wrong, directed by Lowell Sherman, starring Mae West, Cary Grant, Gilbert Roland and Noah Beery Sr.
- She Had to Say Yes, directed by George Amy and Busby Berkeley, starring Loretta Young and Lyle Talbot
- The Son of Kong, directed by Ernest B. Schoedsack, starring Robert Armstrong
- Sons of the Desert, directed by William A. Seiter, starring Laurel and Hardy
- A Southern Maid, directed by Harry Hughes, starring Bebe Daniels – (GB)
- Spring Silkworms (Chūncán), directed by Cheng Bugao – (China)
- State Fair, directed by Henry King, starring Janet Gaynor, Will Rogers and Lew Ayres
- Storm at Daybreak, directed by Richard Boleslawski, starring Kay Francis, Nils Asther and Walter Huston
- The Story of Temple Drake, directed by Stephen Roberts, starring Miriam Hopkins
- The Stranger's Return, directed by King Vidor, starring Lionel Barrymore, Miriam Hopkins and Franchot Tone
- A Study in Scarlet, directed by Edwin L. Marin, starring Reginald Owen and Anna May Wong
- Supernatural, directed by Victor Halperin, starring Carole Lombard and Randolph Scott

=== T ===
- The Testament of Dr. Mabuse, directed by Fritz Lang, starring Rudolf Klein-Rogge and Otto Wernicke – (Germany)
- This Day and Age, directed by Cecil B. Demille, starring Charles Bickford and Richard Cromwell
- This Week of Grace, directed by Maurice Elvey, starring Gracie Fields – (GB)
- Three-Cornered Moon, directed by Elliott Nugent, starring Claudette Colbert and Richard Arlen
- Three Little Pigs, an animated short directed by Burt Gillett
- Tillie and Gus, directed by Francis Martin, starring W. C. Fields and Alison Skipworth
- Today We Live, directed by Howard Hawks, starring Joan Crawford, Gary Cooper, Robert Young and Franchot Tone
- Tonight Is Ours, directed by Stuart Walker, starring Claudette Colbert and Fredric March
- Topaze, directed by D'Abbadie D'Arrast, starring John Barrymore and Myrna Loy
- Torch Singer, directed by Alexander Hall and George Somnes, starring Claudette Colbert and Ricardo Cortez
- Tugboat Annie, directed by Mervyn LeRoy, starring Marie Dressler, Wallace Beery, Robert Young and Maureen O'Sullivan
- Turn Back the Clock, directed by Edgar Selwyn, starring Lee Tracy and Mae Clarke

=== V-W ===
- The Vampire Bat, directed by Frank R. Strayer, starring Lionel Atwill, Fay Wray and Melvyn Douglas
- Viktor und Viktoria (Victor and Victoria), directed by Reinhold Schünzel, starring Renate Müller – (Germany)
- Voltaire, directed by John G. Adolfi, starring George Arliss
- The Wandering Jew, directed by Maurice Elvey, starring Conrad Veidt – (GB)
- What! No Beer?, directed by Edward Sedgwick, starring Buster Keaton and Jimmy Durante
- When Ladies Meet, directed by Harry Beaumont, starring Ann Harding, Robert Montgomery, Myrna Loy and Frank Morgan
- The White Rose, directed by Mohammed Karim, starring Mohammed Abdel Wahab – (Egypt)
- Wild Boys of the Road, directed by William A. Wellman, starring Frankie Darro
- The Working Man, directed by John G. Adolfi, starring George Arliss and Bette Davis
- The World Changes, directed by Mervyn LeRoy, starring Paul Muni, Aline MacMahon and Mary Astor

=== Y-Z ===
- You Made Me Love You, directed by Monty Banks, starring Thelma Todd and Stanley Lupino – (GB)
- Zero for Conduct (Zéro de conduite), directed by Jean Vigo – (France)

== 1933 film releases ==
United States unless stated

=== January–March ===
- January 1933
  - 3 January
    - The Bitter Tea of General Yen
  - 10 January
    - The Vampire Bat
  - 12 January
    - Laughter in Hell
  - 13 January
    - The Monkey's Paw
  - 20 January
    - Ecstasy (Czechoslovakia)
  - 21 January
    - Tonight Is Ours
  - 27 January
    - She Done Him Wrong
  - 28 January
    - Hard to Handle
    - Parachute Jumper
- February 1933
  - 3 February
    - Hallelujah, I'm a Bum
  - 4 February
    - Ladies They Talk About
  - 10 February
    - State Fair
    - What! No Beer?
  - 17 February
    - Men Must Fight
  - 18 February
    - Mystery of the Wax Museum
  - 22 February
    - The House of Dora Green (Germany)
  - 23 February
    - Our Betters
  - 24 February
    - Perfect Understanding (GB)
    - Topaze
  - 28 February
    - The Good Companions
    - Oliver Twist
- March 1933
  - 2 March
    - King Kong
  - 10 March
    - Fast Workers
    - King of the Jungle
    - Liebelei (Germany)
  - 11 March
    - 42nd Street
  - 15 March
    - In the Wake of the Bounty (Australia)
  - 21 March
    - The Flower of Hawaii (Die Blume von Hawaii)
  - 24 March
    - Pick-Up
  - 25 March
    - Okraina (The Outskirts) (U.S.S.R.)
  - 31 March
    - Gabriel Over the White House

=== April–June ===
- April 1933
  - 7 April
    - Zero for Conduct (Zéro de conduite) (France)
  - 14 April
    - Today We Live
  - 15 April
    - Cavalcade
  - 20 April
    - The Working Man
  - 21 April
    - Supernatural
  - 22 April
    - A Bedtime Story
  - 27 April
    - Dragnet Girl (Hijosen no onna)
  - 28 April
    - Looking Forward
- May 1933
  - 5 May
    - The Devil's Brother
  - 6 May
    - The Eagle and the Hawk
    - Picture Snatcher
  - 12 May
    - The Story of Temple Drake
  - 14 May
    - A Study in Scarlet
  - 15 May
    - Ex-Lady
  - 19 May
    - Adorable
  - 25 May
    - Don Quixote
  - 26 May
    - Peg o' My Heart
  - 27 May
    - Gold Diggers of 1933
    - International House
  - 29 May
    - Ganga Bruta (Brazil)
- June 1933
  - 9 June
    - Professional Sweetheart
  - 23 June
    - The Mayor of Hell
    - When Ladies Meet
  - 28 June
    - Samarang
  - 30 June
    - Hold Your Man
    - Midnight Mary

=== July–September ===
- July 1933
  - 1 July
    - Baby Face
  - 3 July
    - Loyalties
  - 8 July
    - It's Great to Be Alive
  - 14 July
    - Bed of Roses
    - Storm at Daybreak
  - 15 July
    - She Done Him Wrong
  - 17 June
    - Heroes for Sale
  - 20 July
    - Secret of the Blue Room
  - 28 July
    - The Stranger's Return
  - 29 July
    - Midnight Club
- August 1933
  - 1 August
    - Employees' Entrance
  - 5 August
    - Voltaire
  - 8 August
    - Three-Cornered Moon
  - 13 August
    - Deluge
  - 16 August
    - The Power and the Glory
  - 17 August
    - The Private Life of Henry VIII
  - 18 August
    - Morning Glory
    - Pilgrimage
  - 25 August
    - This Day and Age
    - Turn Back the Clock
  - 29 August
    - Dinner at Eight
  - 30 August
    - S.O.S Iceberg (S.O.S. Eisberg) (Germany)
  - 31 August
    - Bitter Sweet (GB)
- September 1933
  - 1 September
    - Beauty for Sale
    - One Sunday Afternoon
  - 7 September
    - Passing Fancy (Dekigokoro) (Japan)
  - 8 September
    - Penthouse
    - Torch Singer
  - 13 September
    - Lady for a Day
  - 15 September
    - Berkeley Square
  - 16 September
    - Bureau of Missing Persons
  - 22 September
    - Doctor Bull
  - 23 September
    - I Loved a Woman
  - 26 September
    - Ann Vickers
  - 29 September
    - The Emperor Jones

=== October–December ===
- October 1933
  - 6 October
    - I'm No Angel
  - 7 October
    - Wild Boys of the Road
  - 13 October
    - Bombshell
    - The Bowery
    - Tillie and Gus
  - 21 October
    - Footlight Parade
  - 26 October
    - After Tonight
  - 27 October
    - Man's Castle
  - 28 October
    - Ever in My Heart
- November 1933
  - 1 November
    - Only Yesterday
  - 10 November
    - The Prizefighter and the Lady
  - 13 November
    - The Invisible Man
  - 16 November
    - Little Women
  - 17 November
    - Blood Money
    - Duck Soup
  - November 20
    - The Wandering Jew
  - 24 November
    - Dancing Lady
  - 25 November
    - The World Changes
- December 1933
  - 3 December
    - Lady Killer
  - 11 December
    - Counsellor at Law
  - 14 December
    - Convention City
  - 18 December
    - By Candlelight
  - 21 December
    - Flying Down to Rio
  - 22 December
    - Alice in Wonderland
    - Going Hollywood
    - Mr. Skitch
    - The Son of Kong
  - 23 December
    - The House on 56th Street
    - Viktor und Viktoria (Germany)
  - 25 December
    - Roman Scandals
  - 26 December
    - Queen Christina
  - 29 December
    - Design for Living
    - Sons of the Desert

== Serials ==
- Clancy of the Mounted
- Fighting with Kit Carson
- Gordon of Ghost City
- The Mystery Squadron
- The Perils of Pauline, starring Evalyn Knapp
- The Phantom of the Air
- The Return of Chandu
- Tarzan the Fearless, starring Buster Crabbe
- The Three Musketeers, starring Jack Mulhall and John Wayne
- The Whispering Shadow, starring Bela Lugosi
- The Wolf Dog, starring Rin Tin Tin, Jr.

== Comedy film series ==
- Our Gang (1922–1944)
- Harry Langdon (1924–1936)
- Laurel and Hardy (1927–1945)
- Ted Healy and His Stooges (1933–1934)

== Animated short film series ==
- Aesop's Film Fables (1921–1933)
- Krazy Kat (1925–1940)
- Oswald the Lucky Rabbit (1927–1938)
- Mickey Mouse (1928–1953)
- Silly Symphonies
  - Birds in the Spring
  - Father Noah's Ark
  - Three Little Pigs
  - Old King Cole
  - Lullaby Land
  - The Pied Piper
  - The Night Before Christmas
- Screen Songs (1929–1938)
- Looney Tunes (1930–1969)
- Flip the Frog (1930–1933)
- Terrytoons (1930–1964)
- Merrie Melodies (1931–1969)
- Scrappy (1931–1941)
- Tom and Jerry (Van Beuren) (1931–1933)
- Betty Boop (1932–1939)
  - Betty Boop's Ker-Choo
  - Betty Boop's Crazy Inventions
  - Is My Palm Read?
  - Betty Boop's Penthouse
  - Snow White
  - Betty Boop's Birthday Party
  - Betty Boop's May Party
  - Betty Boop's Big Boss
  - Mother Goose Land
  - Popeye the Sailor
  - The Old Man of the Mountain
  - I Heard
  - Morning, Noon and Night
  - Betty Boop's Hallowe'en Party
  - Parade of the Wooden Soldiers
- Popeye the Sailor (1933–1957)
- Pooch the Pup (1932-1933)
- Willie Whopper (1933–1934)
- ComiColor Cartoons (1933–1936)
- Cubby Bear (1933–1934)
- The Little King (1933–1934)

== Births ==
- January 6 – Mark Forest, American actor and bodybuilder (d. 2022)
- January 8 – Jean-Marie Straub, French director (d. 2006)
- January 9
  - Ken Barrie, English voice actor and singer (d. 2016)
  - Ann Firbank, British actress
- January 10 - Anton Rodgers, English actor (d. 2007)
- January 12 – Liliana Cavani, Italian director
- January 18 – John Boorman, English director
- January 23 – Chita Rivera, American actress, dancer and singer (d. 2024)
- January 28 – Jack Hill, American director and screenwriter
- February 2 – Tony Jay, English actor, voice actor and singer (d. 2006)
- February 3 – Polde Bibič, Slovenian film and stage actor and memoir writer (d. 2012)
- February 9 – Ronnie Claire Edwards, American actress (d. 2016)
- February 12 – Costa-Gavras, Greek-French director, screenwriter and producer
- February 13
  - Caroline Blakiston, English actress
  - Patrick Godfrey, English actor (d. 2026)
  - Kim Novak, American actress
- February 14 – Madhubala, Indian actress (d. 1969)
- February 16 – Ron Faber, American actor (d. 2023)
- February 18
  - Yoko Ono, Japanese multimedia artist, singer and songwriter
  - Željko Senečić, Croatian film, television production designer (d. 2018)
  - Mary Ure, Scottish actress (d. 1975)
- March 2 – Ziva Rodann, Israeli-American actress and mime artist
- March 3
  - John Dair, Scottish actor (d. 2005)
  - Tomas Milian, Cuban actor and singer (d. 2017)
- March 7 - Donald Douglas, Scottish actor (d. 2026)
- March 11 – Sandra Milo, Italian actress (d. 2024)
- March 12 – Barbara Feldon, American actress
- March 13 – Gloria McMillan, American actress (d. 2022)
- March 14 – Michael Caine, English actor
- March 19
  - Renée Taylor, American actress, screenwriter, playwright, producer and director
  - Richard Williams, Canadian-British animator (d. 2019)
- March 22 – Richard Easton, Canadian actor (d. 2019)
- March 23 – Laura Soveral, Portuguese actress (d. 2018)
- March 24 – William Smith, American actor (d. 2021)
- March 26 – Tinto Brass, Italian director and screenwriter (d. 2026)
- April 2 – Joseph Rigano, American character actor (d. 2014)
- April 5 – Frank Gorshin, American actor and comedian (d. 2005)
- April 9 – Jean-Paul Belmondo, French actor (d. 2021)
- April 14 – Shani Wallis, British actress and singer
- April 15 – Elizabeth Montgomery, American actress (d. 1995)
- April 16 – Ric Mancini, American actor (d. 2006)
- April 18 – Harold Innocent, English actor (d. 1993)
- April 19 – Jayne Mansfield, American actress (d. 1967)
- April 20 – George R. Robertson, Canadian actor (d. 2023)
- April 22 – Mark Damon, American actor and producer (d. 2024)
- April 26 – Carol Burnett, American actress, television host and comedian
- April 29 – Willie Nelson, American musician and actor
- May 10
  - Francoise Fabian, French actress
  - Pat Gorman, British actor (d. 2018)
- May 14
  - Siân Phillips, Welsh actress
  - Michael Preston, English actor (d. 2026)
- May 20 – Constance Towers, American actress and singer
- May 21 – Richard Libertini, American actor (d. 2016)
- May 23 – Joan Collins, English actress
- May 28 - Zelda Rubinstein, American actress (d. 2010)
- June 1 - Antony Ponzini, American actor (d. 2002)
- June 8 - Joan Rivers, American comedian, actress, producer, writer and television host (d. 2014)
- June 9 - Mario Donatone, Italian actor (d. 2020)
- June 11 – Gene Wilder, American actor (d. 2016)
- June 20
  - Danny Aiello, American actor (d. 2019)
  - Brett Halsey, American actor
- June 21 – Bernie Kopell, American character actor
- June 30 – Lea Massari, Italian actress (d. 2025)
- July 6 - Sajjad Kishwar, Pakistani actor (d. 2022)
- July 11 - Per Myrberg, Swedish actor and singer (d. 2023)
- July 12 - Max Julien, American actor (d. 2022)
- July 13 - Theresa Amayo, Brazilian actress (d. 2022)
- July 24 – John Aniston, Greek-born American actor (d. 2022)
- July 25 - Ken Swofford, American actor (d. 2018)
- July 26
  - Kathryn Hays, American actress (d. 2022)
  - Chino 'Fats' Williams, American actor (d. 2000)
- July 29
  - Lou Albano, Italian-born American professional wrestler and actor (d. 2009)
  - Robert Fuller, American actor
- August 1 – Dom DeLuise, American actor and comedian (d. 2009)
- August 2 – Tom Bell, English actor (d. 2006)
- August 10 – Lynn Cohen, American actress (d. 2020)
- August 13 - Vyjayanthimala, Indian former actress
- August 16 – Julie Newmar, American actress, dancer and singer
- August 18 – Roman Polanski, Polish director
- August 19 – Debra Paget, American actress and entertainer
- August 21 – Barry Norman, English critic (d. 2017)
- August 25 – Tom Skerritt, American actor (d. 2026)
- August 28 – Philip French, English critic (d. 2015)
- August 29 - Patricia Conolly, Australian actress
- September 4 – Richard S. Castellano, American actor (d. 1988)
- September 14 - Zoe Caldwell, Australian-born actress (d. 2020)
- September 15 - Henry Darrow, American character actor (d. 2021)
- September 17 – Pat Crowley, American actress (d. 2025)
- September 18
  - Robert Blake, American actor (d. 2023)
  - Fred Willard, American actor (d. 2020)
- September 19 – David McCallum, British-American actor and musician (d. 2023)
- September 27 – Kathleen Nolan, American actress
- September 28 – Robert Hogan, American actor (d. 2021)
- September 29
  - Franca Parisi, Italian actress
  - James Villiers, English character actor (d. 1998)
- September 30
  - Ben Cooper, American actor (d. 2020)
  - Barbara Knox, English actress
- October 24
  - J. J. Johnston, American actor and writer (d. 2022)
  - Enzo Robutti, Italian actor, voice actor, comedian, playwright and writer (d. 2022)
- October 25 - Peter Dennis, English actor (d. 2009)
- November 3 – Jeremy Brett, English actor (d. 1995)
- November 9 - Louise Troy, American actress (d. 1994)
- November 13 - Karl-Otto Alberty, German actor (d. 2015)
- November 15 - Donald Pickering, English actor (d. 2009)
- November 17 – Terry, American performing Cairn Terrier (d. 1945)
- November 19 - Larry King, American television and radio host (d. 2021)
- November 21 - J. Don Ferguson, American character actor (d. 2008)
- November 25 – Kathryn Crosby, American actress (d. 2024)
- November 26 - Robert Goulet, American-Canadian actor and singer (d. 2007)
- November 28 – Hope Lange, American actress (d. 2003)
- November 30 – Warren Munson, American actor
- December 3 – Rosalind Knight, English actress (d. 2020)
- December 4 – Horst Buchholz, German actor (d. 2003)
- December 5 - Adolph Caesar, American actor (d. 1986)
- December 8 - Ana Ofelia Murguía, Mexican actress (d. 2023)
- December 10 - Mako, Japanese-American actor (d. 2006)
- December 13 – Lou Adler, American producer
- December 15 – Tim Conway, American actor and comedian (d. 2019)
- December 22 - Elizabeth Hubbard, American actress (d. 2023)
- December 26 - Caroll Spinney, American puppeteer (d. 2019)
- December 31 - Edward Bunker, American actor (d. 2005)

== Deaths ==
- January 3 – Jack Pickford, Canadian-born American actor and director (born 1896)
- January 25 – Lewis J. Selznick, Ukrainian-born American producer (born 1870)
- February 15 – Pat Sullivan, Australian-born American director/producer of animated films, alleged co-creator of Felix the Cat (born 1885)
- February 23 – David Horsley, English-born American film executive (born 1873)
- February 26 – Spottiswoode Aitken, American actor (born 1868)
- March 8 – Alan Roscoe, American actor (born 1886)
- March 23 – Francine Mussey, French actress (born 1897)
- May 15 – Ernest Torrence, Scottish actor (born 1878)
- June 18 – Harry Sweet, American actor and director (born 1901)
- June 29 – Roscoe Arbuckle, American actor (born 1887)
- June 30 – Georg Blomstedt, Swedish actor (born 1872)
- August 18 – James Williamson, Scottish film developer and film director (born 1855)
- August 28 – Helen Dunbar, American actress (born 1863)
- September 23 – Sime Silverman, American newspaper publisher, founder of Variety (born 1873)
- September 24 – Ferdinand Bonn, German actor (born 1861)
- October 5 – Renée Adorée, French actress (born 1898)
- October 30 – Svend Kornbeck, Danish actor (born 1869)
- December 19 – Jimmie Adams, American comedian (born 1888)
- December 22 - William J. Dyer, American actor (born 1881)

== Film debuts ==
- Judith Allen – The Thundering Herd
- Judith Anderson – Blood Money
- Morris Ankrum – Reunion in Vienna
- Fred Astaire – Dancing Lady
- Lucille Ball – The Bowery
- Bonnie Bannon – The Little Giant
- Lynn Bari – Meet the Baron
- Don "Red" Barry – This Day and Age
- John Beal – Another Language
- Scotty Beckett – Gallant Lady
- Lola Braccini – My Little One
- Spring Byington – Little Women
- Dolores Camarillo – The Lark
- Cliff Clark – Big Time or Bust
- Mabel Colcord – Little Women
- Ellen Corby – Storm at Daybreak
- Robert Cummings – Sons of the Desert
- Ruby Dandridge – King Kong
- Shirley Deane – Dancing Lady
- Dorothy Dearing – Dancing Lady
- Leif Erickson – The Sweetheart of Sigma Chi
- Douglas Fowley – The Mad Game
- Errol Flynn – In the Wake of the Bounty
- Ruth Gillette – Stage Mother
- Stewart Granger – The Song You Gave Me
- Everley Gregg – The Private Life of Henry VIII
- Alan Hale Jr. – Wild Boys of the Road
- Margaret Hamilton – Zoo in Budapest
- Jimmy Hanley – Red Wagon
- Louis Jean Heydt – Before Morning
- Louis Jouvet – Topaze
- Patsy Kelly – Going Hollywood
- Milton Kibbee – Mystery of the Wax Museum
- Percy Kilbride – White Woman
- Adriana Lamar – La Llorona
- Karen Lykkehus – De blaa drenge
- Marianne Löfgren – The Dangerous Game
- Trude Marlen – A Prince's Young Love
- Bernard Miles – Channel Crossing
- William Newell – Bombshell
- Assia Noris – Three Lucky Fools
- Henry O'Neill – I Loved a Woman
- Barbara Pepper – Roman Scandals
- Frederick Piper – The Good Companions
- Jack Rice – No Marriage Ties
- Ralph Richardson – The Ghoul
- Giuditta Rissone – Everybody's Secretary
- Cesar Romero – The Shadow Laughs
- Shirley Ross – Bombshell
- Renée Saint-Cyr – The Two Orphans
- Marla Shelton – Flying Down to Rio
- Terry-Thomas – The Private Life of Henry VIII
- Andrew Tombes – The Bowery
- Henry Travers – Reunion in Vienna
- Claire Trevor – Life in the Raw
- Russell Wade – The Wrecker
- Ray Walker – He Couldn't Take It
- Bill Williams – King Kong
- Marie Wilson – Flying Down to Rio
- María Luisa Zea – La Llorona
