= 1932 in Brazil =

Events in the year 1932 in Brazil.

== Incumbents ==
=== Federal government ===
- President: Getúlio Vargas (Head of the Provisional Government)
- Vice President: none

=== Governors ===
- Alagoas: Tasso de Oliveira Tinoco; Louis de France Albuquerque
- Amazonas: Álvaro Botelho Maia
- Bahia: Juracy Magalhães
- Ceará: Manuel Fernandes Távora
- Goiás:
  - till 3 November: Pedro Ludovico Teixeira
  - 3 November - 20 December: Mário de Alencastro Caiado
- from 20 December: Pedro Ludovico Teixeira
- Maranhão: Lourival Seroa da Mota
- Mato Grosso: Artur Antunes Maciel; Leônidas Antero de Matos
- Minas Gerais: Olegário Dias Maciel
- Pará: Joaquim de Magalhães Barata
- Paraíba:
  - till 26 April: Antenor de França Navarro
  - from 26 April: Gratuliano da Costa Brito
- Pernambuco: Carlos de Lima Cavalcanti
- Piauí: Landry Sales
- Paraná:
  - João Perneta
  - Manuel Ribas
- Rio Grande do Norte: Hercolino Cascardo (until June 11, 1932); Bertino Dutra da Silva (from June 11, 1932)
- Rio Grande do Sul: José Antônio Flores da Cunha
- Santa Catarina:
- São Paulo: Manuel Rabelo (until March 7, 1932); Pedro Manuel de Toledo (from July 10, 1932)
- Sergipe:

=== Vice governors ===
- Rio Grande do Norte:
- São Paulo:

== Events ==
The original flag of Brazilian Integralism

- 24 February
  - The Justiça Eleitoral do Brasil is created by Decreto nº 21.076.
  - Women win the right to vote.
- April – Peter Fleming joins the expedition to find missing Englishman Colonel Percy Fawcett; the following year he publishes an account of the expedition, entitled Brazilian Adventure.
- 23 May – Four protesting students (Martins, Miragaia, Dráusio and Camargo) are killed by government troops, sparking off the "Paulista War".
- June – Paulista rebels take control of the state of São Paulo.
- 9 July – Constitutionalist Revolution: The population of the state of São Paulo revolt against the 1930 coup d'état.
- July–August – 82 athletes from Brazil travel on board the Itaquicê to Los Angeles for the Summer Olympic Games, selling coffee along the way to fund the trip. The team wins no medals.
- 2 October – The São Paulo rebels are defeated by government forces.
- October – Brazilian Integralism, a Fascist movement, is founded by Plínio Salgado.

== Arts and culture ==
=== Books ===
- Afonso Schmidt – Garoa

=== Films ===
- Ao Redor do Brasil
- Anchieta Entre o Amor e a Religião
- O Pecado da Vaidade

== Births ==
- 26 January – Kilza Setti, ethnomusicologist, composer, and pianist
- 19 February – Alberto Dines, journalist and writer (died 2018)
- 26 April – Agildo Ribeiro, actor and humorist (died 2018)
- 28 April – Stênio Garcia, actor
- 6 May – José Maria Marin, politician and sports administrator
- 12 May – Walter Wanderley, organist and pianist, best known for his lounge and bossa nova music. (died 1986)
- 25 May – Joaquim Pedro de Andrade, film director and screenwriter (died 1988)
- 21 June – Ilka Soares, actress
- 23 July – Oswaldo Loureiro, Brazilian actor (died 2018)
- 28 July – Carlos Alberto Brilhante Ustra, military officer and politician (died 2015)
- 28 August – Raul Cortez, actor (died 2006)
- 15 September – Antônio Abujamra, theatre and television director and actor (died 2015)
- 14 November – Cláudio Ulpiano, philosopher (died 1999)

== Deaths ==
date unknown – Evaristo Conrado Engelberg, mechanical engineer and inventor (born 1853)

=== July ===
- 2 July - Rodolfo Teófilo, writer, poet and film-maker (born 1863)
- 23 July – Alberto Santos-Dumont, Franco-Brazilian aviation pioneer (born 1873; apparent suicide by hanging)

== See also ==
- 1932 in Brazilian football
- List of Brazilian films of 1932
