= Ulpiano =

Ulpiano is a male given name. Notable people with the name include:

== Given name ==
- Ulpiano Babol (1936–1973), Filipino swimmer
- Ulpiano Checa (1860–1916), Spanish painter, sculptor, poster designer and illustrator
- Ulpiano Colóm (1861–1906), Mayor of Ponce, Puerto Rico, during part of 1898
- Ulpiano Díaz (1900–1990), Cuban timbalero
- Ulpiano Sergio Reyes (born 1967), better known as Mellow Man Ace, Cuban-American rapper
- Ulpiano Cos Villa (died 2014), Spanish-language sports broadcaster
- Ulpiano Volpi (1559–1629), Italian Roman Catholic prelate, Archbishop of Novara then of Chieti

== See also ==
- Cláudio Ulpiano (1932–1999), Brazilian philosopher
- Ulpian, Roman jurist
- Ulpiana, ancient Roman city
- General Ulpiano Paez Airport, airport in the Santa Elena Province of Ecuador
