= List of Brazilian films of the 1930s =

This is a list of Brazilian films of the 1930s. For a complete alphabetical list, see Category:Brazilian films.

== 1930 ==
- List of Brazilian films of 1930

== 1931 ==
- List of Brazilian films of 1931

== 1932 ==
- List of Brazilian films of 1932

== 1933 ==
- List of Brazilian films of 1933

== 1934 ==
- List of Brazilian films of 1934

== 1935 ==
- List of Brazilian films of 1935

== 1936 ==
- List of Brazilian films of 1936

== 1937 ==
- List of Brazilian films of 1937

== 1938 ==
- List of Brazilian films of 1938

== 1939 ==
- List of Brazilian films of 1939
