= 1933 in Brazil =

Events in the year 1933 in Brazil.

== Incumbents ==
=== Federal government ===
- President: Getúlio Vargas (Head of the Provisional Government)
- Vice President: none

=== Governors ===
- Alagoas: Louis de France Albuquerque (till 10 January); Alfonso de Carvalho (from 10 January)
- Amazonas: Álvaro Botelho Maia (till 10 October); Nélson de Melo (from 10 October)
- Bahia: Juracy Magalhães
- Ceará: Roberto Carneiro de Mendonça
- Goiás:
  - till 31 July: Pedro Ludovico Teixeira
  - 31 July - 8 September: José Carvalho dos Santos Azevedo
  - from 8 September: Pedro Ludovico Teixeira
- Maranhão:
  - till 10 February: Lourival Seroa da Mota
  - 10 February - 30 April: Américo Wanick
  - 30 April - 29 June: Álvaro Saldanha
  - from 29 June: Antônio Martins de Almeida
- Mato Grosso: Leônidas Antero de Matos
- Minas Gerais:
  - till 5 September: Olegário Maciel
  - 5 September - 15 December: Gustavo Capanema
  - from 15 December: Benedito Valadares
- Pará: Joaquim de Magalhães Barata
- Paraíba: Gratuliano da Costa Brito
- Paraná: Manuel Ribas
- Pernambuco: Carlos de Lima Cavalcanti
- Piauí: Landry Sales
- Rio Grande do Norte:
  - till 2 August: Bertino Dutra da Silva
  - from 2 August: Mario Leopoldo Pereira da Camera
- Rio Grande do Sul: José Antônio Flores da Cunha
- Santa Catarina:
- São Paulo:
- Sergipe:

=== Vice governors ===
- Rio Grande do Norte:
- São Paulo:

== Events ==
- 19 April – Octávio Barbosa marries Beatriz de Lima Viana, at Belo Horizonte.
- 1 June – The Federal University of São Paulo is founded in São Paulo, Brazil.
- 20 July – New airline Aerolloyd Iguassu goes into operation, with flights between Curitiba and São Paulo.
- 10 October – The Anti-war Treaty of Non-aggression and Conciliation, an inter-American treaty, is signed in Rio de Janeiro by representatives of Argentina, Brazil, Chile, Mexico, Paraguay and Uruguay.
- 24 October – The city of Goiânia, capital of Goiás, is founded.

== Arts and culture ==
=== Books ===
- Peter Fleming – Brazilian Adventure
- Gilberto Freyre – Casa-Grande e Senzala

=== Films ===
- A Voz do Carnaval
- Ganga Bruta
- Honra e Ciúmes
- Onde a Terra Acaba

== Births ==
- 7 January - Nicette Bruno, actress (died 2020)
- 9 January – Paulo Goulart, actor (died 2014)
- 27 January – Ary Fontoura, actor, writer, director, poet and TV-presenter
- 14 March – Manoel Carlos, novelist
- 8 July – Paulo Tarso Flecha de Lima, diplomat (died 2021)
- 28 October – Garrincha, footballer (died 1983)
- 5 November – Paulo César Saraceni, film director and screenwriter (died 2012)
- 14 December – Eva Wilma, actress (died 2021)

== Deaths ==
- 25 March – João de Deus Mena Barreto, a member of the junta that temporarily governed Brazil when Washington Luís was deposed.
- 19 April – Vital Soares, lawyer and politician (born 1874)
- 2 May – Juliano Moreira, psychiatrist (born 1872)
- 23 October – Jerônimo de Sousa Monteiro, politician (born 1870)

== See also ==
- 1933 in Brazilian football
- List of Brazilian films of 1933
