= Cajuína =

Beverage made of blended cashew apples

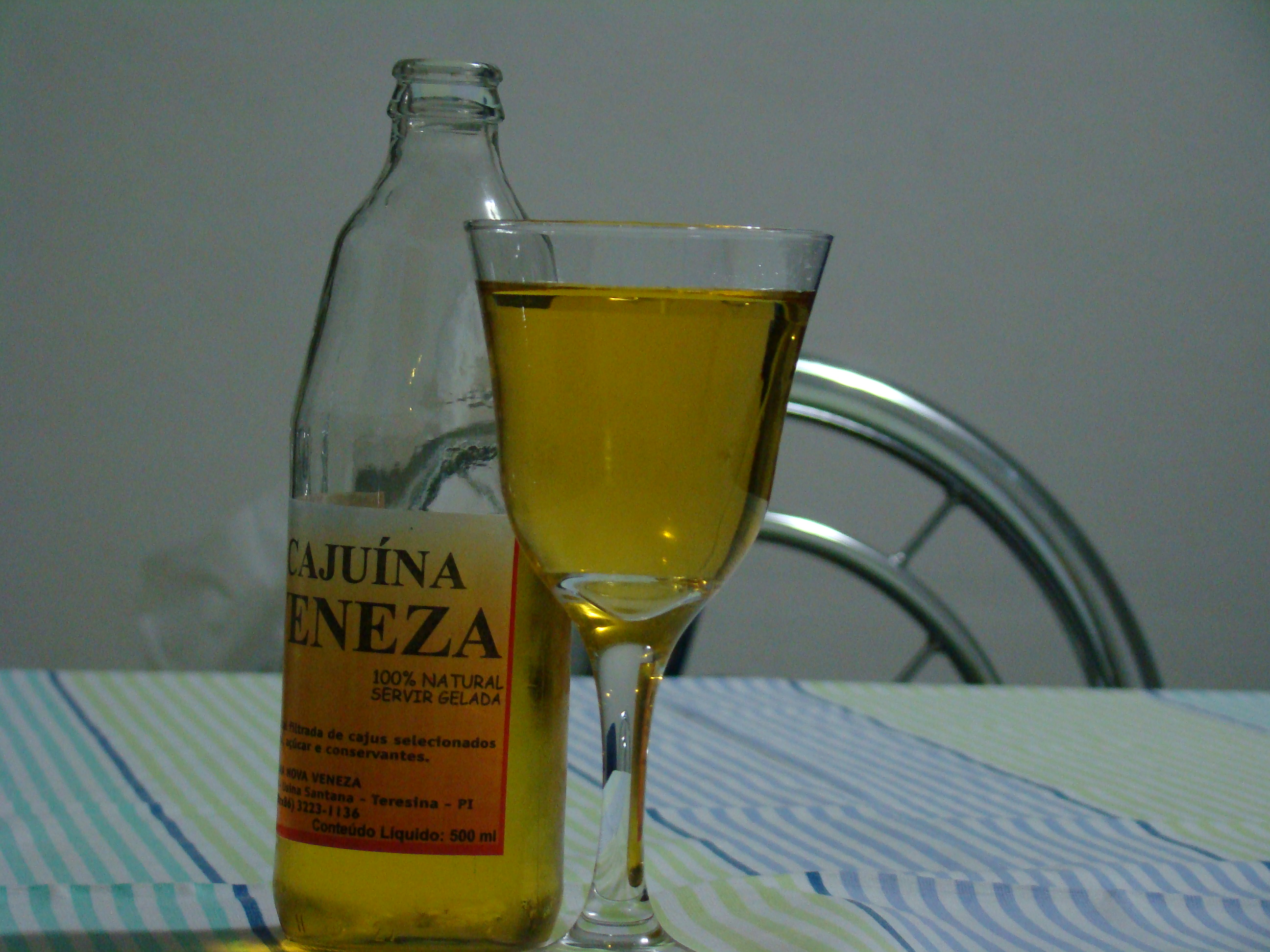
Cajuína from Teresina, Piauí, Brazil

Cajuína (Brazilian Portuguese: [kaˌʒuˈinɐ]) is a non-alcoholic, non-carbonated beverage made of blended cashew apples. It is traditional in the northeast region of Brazil, especially in the state of Piauí.

It was invented by writer and pharmacist Rodolfo Teófilo in the 1890s, who sought to find a healthier alternative to alcoholic beverages. Cajuína is produced by Appert's method—that is, heating clarified cashew juice in a sealed container. The caramelization of its sugars gives cajuína its flavor and distinctive golden color. The process also sterilizes the beverage, allowing it to be stored for long periods.

A cashew-flavored carbonated soda is also popularly known as cajuína in Ceará.

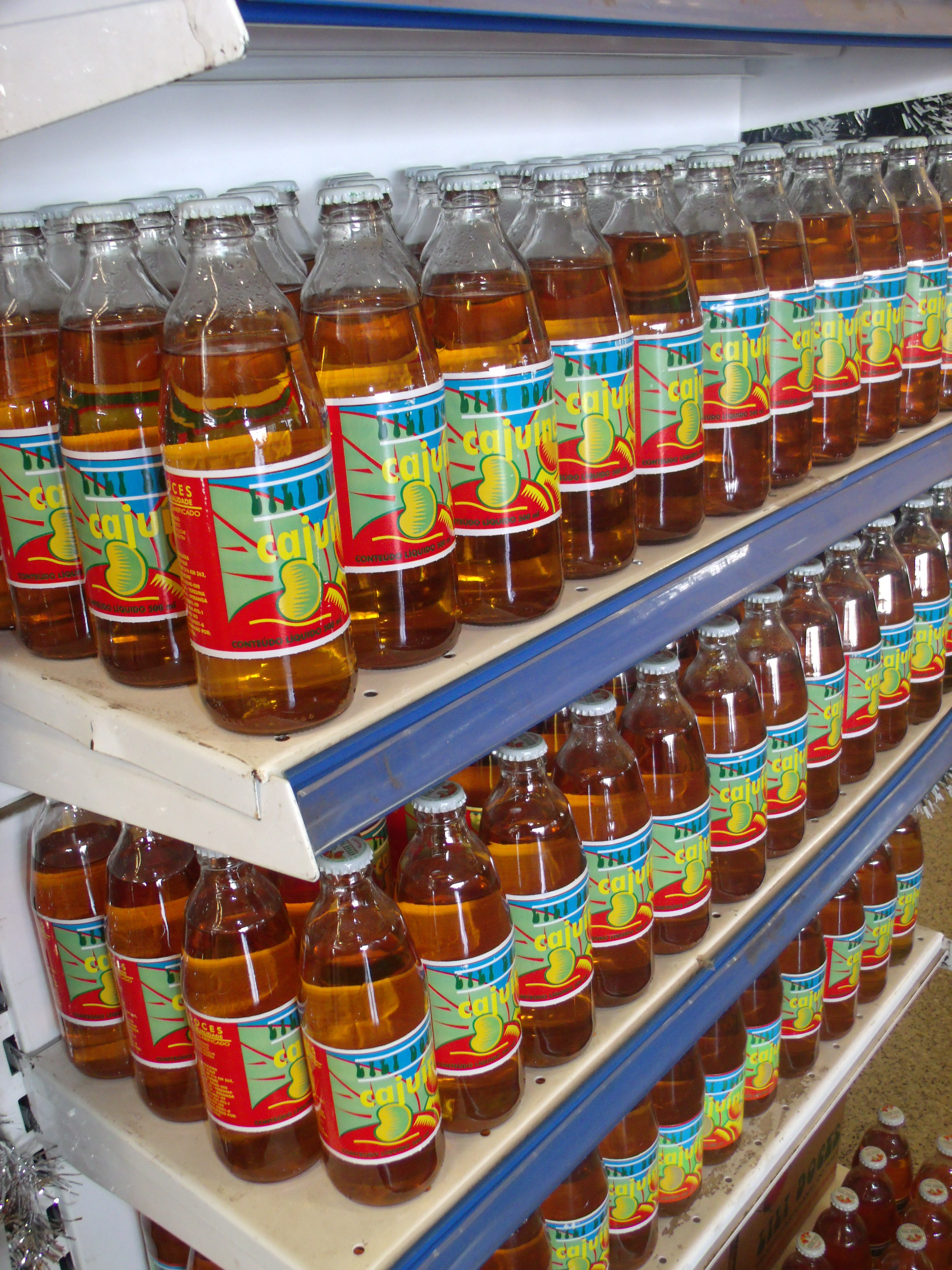
Cajuína bottles sold in a supermarket in Piauí.

== Tribute ==
The singer and composer Caetano Veloso composed a song titled Cajuína, in which he mentions the drink.
