= The Bowery (film) =

1933 film directed by Raoul Walsh

- Theatrical release poster
- Directed by: Raoul Walsh
- Written by: Howard Estabrook; James Gleason
- Based on: Chuck Connors (novel) by Michael L. Simmons; Bessie Roth Solomon
- Produced by: Darryl F. Zanuck; Joseph M. Schenck
- Starring: Wallace Beery; George Raft; Jackie Cooper; Fay Wray
- Cinematography: Barney McGill
- Edited by: Allen McNeil
- Music by: Alfred Newman
- Production company: Twentieth Century Pictures
- Distributed by: United Artists
- Release date: October 13, 1933
- Running time: 92 minutes
- Country: United States
- Language: English
- Box office: $2 million (US & Canada rentals)

The Bowery is a 1933 American pre-Code historical comedy-drama film set on the Lower East Side of Manhattan around the start of the 20th century directed by Raoul Walsh and starring Wallace Beery and George Raft. The supporting cast features Jackie Cooper, Fay Wray, and Pert Kelton.

== Plot ==
Wallace Beery as Chuck Connors

In the Gay Nineties, on New York's Bowery, saloon owner Chuck Connors, finds that his rival, Steve Brodie, has thrown a melon at his window. The happy-go-lucky Brodie explains that he threw the melon on a dare. As Connors threatens to fight him, the two learn of a fire in neighboring Chinatown. Both men call upon their volunteer fire brigades, and wager $100 on which will be the first to throw water on the fire.

Although Brodie is first to arrive, he finds Connor's young pal, Swipes McGurk, sitting on a barrel placed over the fire hydrant preventing Brodie from using it first. Connors arrives and the rival fire fighters brawl as the fire reduces the building to a smoldering ruin, presumably incinerating the crowd of Chinese trapped inside who had been screaming for help at the window. Brodie vows revenge on Connors, leading to a $500 bet that a boxer, whom Brodie calls "The Masked Marvel", can beat "Bloody Butch" a prizefighter that Conners manages. Conners accepts, and the "Marvel" knocks out Bloody Butch with one punch. After the fight, the "Marvel" is revealed to be John L. Sullivan.

Connors meets a homeless girl named Lucy Calhoun and takes her to his apartment, where he lives with Swipes, and lets her spend the night. In the morning, he is pleasantly surprised (and Swipes annoyed), to find that Lucy has cleaned up the place and cooked breakfast. Swipes later locks Lucy in a closet and, when Connors finds her, spanks him. Humiliated, Swipes packs and leaves. That night, Brodie invites Swipes to move in with him, which he does. Finding out about Lucy, Brodie attempts to seduce her, thinking that she is Connors' mistress. She bites his hand, drawing blood, and after learning her identity, he apologizes and asks if he can call on her. They soon fall in love, and Brodie reveals his ambition to run a saloon bigger than Connors'.

When two brewers offer to sponsor him if he can bring his name into prominence, Brodie decides to jump off the Brooklyn Bridge as a stunt. Connors bets his saloon against a free burial that Brodie won't survive. Scheming to avoid actually jumping, Brodie gets a life-sized dummy made up to look like him and arranges for Swipes to throw it off the bridge at the time of the jump. As a crowd of 100,000 gathers at the bridge, Swipes finds the dummy missing. Swipes observes "They were hip to us so they copped it."

Despite Swipes's pleas, and left without any other option, Brodie vows to make the jump anyway, so that no one can say he didn't take a dare. Meanwhile, temperance activist Carrie Nation and her band of women arrive at Connors' saloon to tear it down with axes and hatchets. When he sees Brodie lifted in a parade after making the jump, however, Connors encourages the activists to destroy the saloon, which they do.

Brodie re-opens the refurbished saloon, and when war is declared against Spain, Connors enlists in an effort to get away from the Bowery, where he is no longer a big shot. When he returns to his apartment to pack, he finds that Swipes has returned and reconciles with the boy. Brodie's professional rivals find Connors and falsely claim Brodie did not actually jump from the bridge, showing him the dummy. Connors demands Brodie give his saloon back. Brodie denies using the dummy, and the two have a long fight on a barge in the East River to settle their differences. After Connors returns victorious, he is arrested for assault and battery with intent to kill.

Brodie, however, refuses to implicate him. As Brodie recovers, Connors visits his hospital only to begin another fight, but Swipes stops them and urges them to become friends. After they shake hands, Connors dares Brodie to join him in Cuba. At a parade for departing soldiers, Connors tells Lucy to kiss Brodie goodbye, and after she does, she also kisses Connors. The men lament not being able to say goodbye to Swipes, but they soon see, to their delight, that he is hiding in an artillery box on the supply wagon just ahead of them.

== Cast ==
Jackie Cooper as Swipes McGurk

- Wallace Beery as Chuck Connors
- George Raft as Steve Brodie
- Jackie Cooper as Swipes McGurk
- Fay Wray as Lucy Calhoun
- Pert Kelton as Trixie Odbray
- Herman Bing as Max Herman
- Oscar Apfel as Ivan Rummel
- Ferdinand Munier as Honest Mike
- George Walsh as John L. Sullivan
- Lillian Harmer as Carrie Nation
- John Bleifer as Mumbo the Mute (uncredited)
- Heinie Conklin as Pug (uncredited)
- Charles Middleton as Detective (uncredited)
- Harry Tenbrook as Fireman (uncredited)
- Wong Chung as Irate Chinese Man (uncredited)

== Production ==
George Raft as Steve Brodie

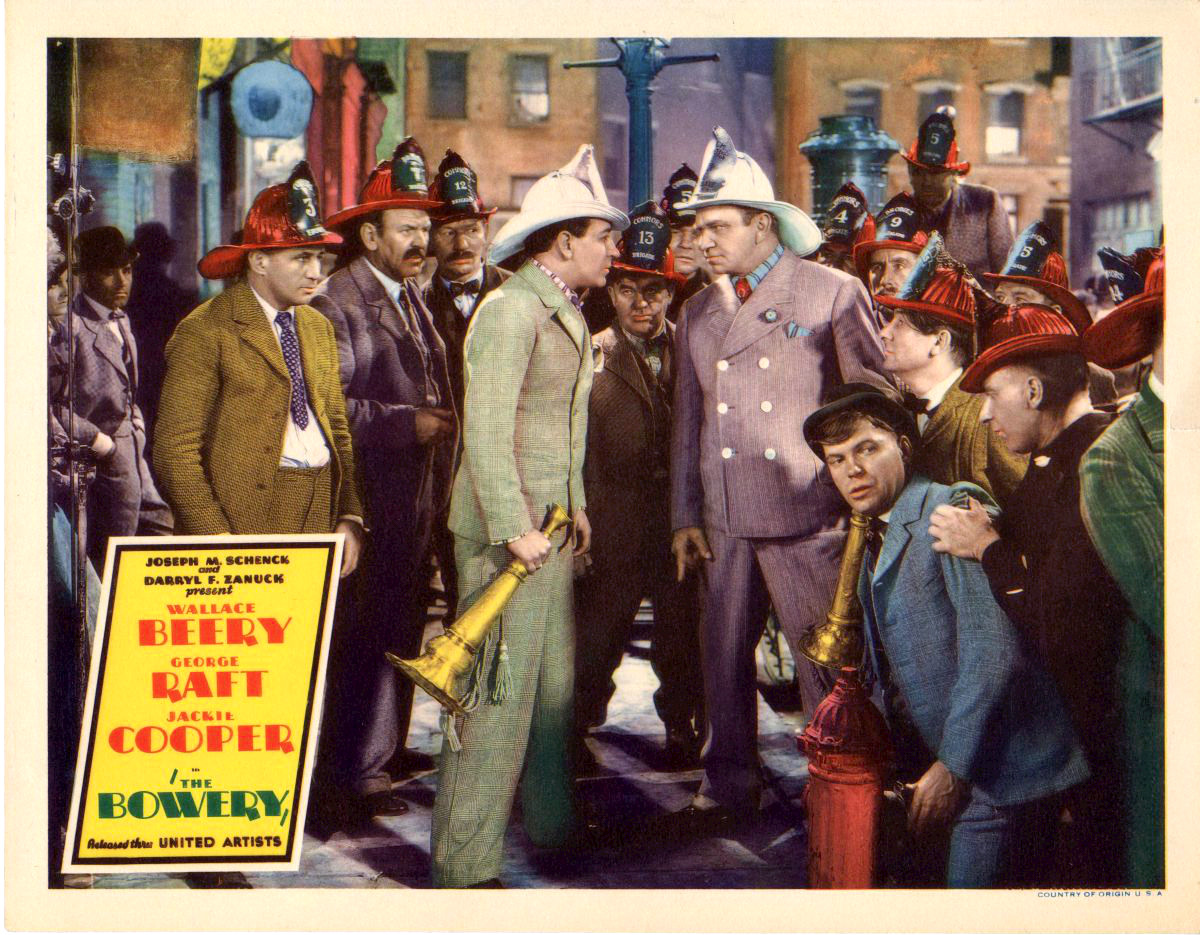
Lobby card with George Raft and Wallace Beery in their white Fire Chief helmets

The Bowery was the first film produced by Twentieth Century Pictures; two years later it would merge with the Fox Film Corporation to form Twentieth Century-Fox.

The movie features Wallace Beery as saloon owner Chuck Connors, George Raft as Steve Brodie, the first man to jump off the Brooklyn Bridge and live, Jackie Cooper as a pugnacious child, Fay Wray as the leading lady, and Pert Kelton as a bawdy dance hall singer. (There had been some talk that Beery's fellow MGM contract player Clark Gable would play the Raft role.)

Director Raoul Walsh later wrote, in his autobiography Each Man in His Time, that directing Beery and Raft "was like trying to keep the peace between a lion and a tiger" although he said "both men were big hearted, generous to a fault. Professional jealousy waned after each had registered his beef. Later, they became good friends."

The film is an absorbing presentation of the views and behaviors common at the time. The movie opens with a close-up of a saloon window featuring a sign saying "Nigger Joe's" in large letters (the name of an actual Bowery bar from the period operated by an African-American). Cooper's character has a habit of throwing rocks at people's windows in Chinatown. When Beery's character berates him for doing so, Cooper's character responds, "They was just Chinks", whereupon Beery immediately softens, saying "Awww..." while affectionately mussing the boy's hair. At one point, Cooper's character breaks a window, knocking over a kerosene lamp and causing a lethal fire that spreads through the block. Frantic Chinese people trapped in the fire are shown desperately trying to escape, followed by a depiction of the ashes of their building in which they had presumably died while two rival fire companies (Beery's and Raft's) had physically fought over which one would put out the fire while the building burned to the ground.

The Bowery bears some resemblances to a concurrent movie She Done Him Wrong, a film starring Mae West and Cary Grant released earlier the same year by a different studio (Paramount Pictures) featuring Wallace Beery's older brother Noah Beery in a similar role as a Bowery saloon owner sleeping with Mae West's character.

Raoul Walsh had directed a groundbreaking film about the Bowery as far back as 1915. Regeneration (1915), shot on location in the Bowery in 1915, was the first full-length gangster movie, featuring tattered clothing on cast members far more ragged than anything seen in any subsequent American narrative film as well as being entirely shot among a broad panoply of actual 1915 Bowery locations.

The Bowery was one of 11 films in which Wray portrayed the leading lady in 1933, including the original version of King Kong.

== Reception ==
The film was Twentieth Century's second most popular movie of the year.

The film was one of United Artists' more popular films of the year.

Raft, a major star in the 1930s and '40s, would go on to make several more films for Daryl F Zanuck despite never being under long-term contract to him.

== Proposed remakes ==
In 1943 it was announced that 20th Century Fox would remake the film as a musical, Bowery After Midnight, with William Bendix in the Beery role. In 1946 the project was going to be called Brooklyn Bridge and star Victor Mature in the Raft part. In 1948 George Jessel was going to star. However, these projects never got past the planning phase.
