= List of Egyptian films of 1933 =

A list of films produced in Egypt in 1933. For an A-Z list of films currently on Wikipedia, see Category:Egyptian films.

Title	Director	Cast	Genre	Notes
Indama Touhibb Al-mar'a (When Women Love)	Ahmed Galal	Assia Dagher, Mary Queeny		
Al-Zawag (The Marriage)	Fatma Rouchdi	Fatma Rouchdi, Mahmoud el-Meliguy		
Kaffiri 'an Khati'atik (Atone for Your Sin)	Aziza Amir	Aziza Amir, Zaki Rostom		
Goha wa Abou Nawwas Mousawwiran (Goha and Abou Nawwas Photographers)	Manuel Vimance	Ismail Zaki, Khaled Chawki		
Awlad Misr (Sons of Egypt)	Togo Mizrahi	Ahmed al-Machriqi, Gian Rifaat		
Al Warda al-baida (The White Rose)	Mohammed Karim	Mohammed Abdel Wahab, Samira Khouloussi		Landmark musical
Al-Khatib Nimrah Talatachar (The Fiancé Number 13)	Mohamed Bayoumi	Mohamed Bayoumi, Dawlat Bayoumi		
