= Ángel Torres (author) =

Cuban historian (1928–2010)

Ángel Torres (1928–9 December 2010) was an author, historian and sportswriter who penned numerous Spanish-language books, usually about Cuban baseball.

Books he wrote include La Historia Del Beisbol Cubano 1878-1976, La Leyenda Del Beisbol Cubano, Tres Siglos De Beisbol Cubano, El Legado Deportivo and The Baseball Bible (in English).

He also worked for Fox Sports, calling regular season and World Series baseball games in Spanish alongside Ulpiano Cos Villa.

In 2009, he won the National Award for Journalism from the National Journalists Association of Cuba in Exile.

== Personal life ==
He was born in 1928 in La Habana, Cuba. He attended the Cuban-American Institute and English Special Center at Jesus del Monte, while still in Cuba, whence he graduated in 1947. He eventually emigrated to the United States. He died on December 9, 2010, at age 82.
