= List of Soviet films of 1933 =

A list of films produced in the Soviet Union in 1933 (see 1933 in film).

== 1933 ==
Title	Russian title	Director	Cast	Genre	Notes
1933
The Conveyor of Death	Конвейер смерти	Ivan Pyryev	Ada Vojtsik	Drama	
The Deserter	Дезертир	Vsevolod Pudovkin	Boris Livanov	Drama	
The Great Consoler	Великий утешитель	Lev Kuleshov	Konstantin Khokhlov	Drama	
House of Greed	Иудушка Головлёв	Aleksandr Ivanovsky	Vladimir Gardin	Drama	
My Motherland	Моя Родина	Iosif Kheifits, Aleksandr Zarkhi	Bari Haydarov	Drama	
Outskirts	Окраина	Boris Barnet	Sergey Komarov, Elena Kuzmina	Drama	
The Storm	Гроза	Vladimir Petrov	Alla Tarasova	Drama	

== See also ==
- 1933 in the Soviet Union
