= List of Brazilian films of 1932 =

A list of films produced in Brazil in 1932:

Title	Director	Cast	Genre	Notes
1932
Anchieta Entre o Amor e a Religião	Arturo Carrari	Dino Grey, Antonio Rolando, Irene Rudner	Drama	
O Pecado da Vaidade	Eduardo Abelim	Eduardo Abelim, Ivone Campos, Canguru	Drama	

== See also ==
- 1932 in Brazil
