= List of Brazilian films of 1933 =

A list of films produced in Brazil in 1933:

Title	Director	Cast	Genre	Notes
A Voz do Carnaval	Adhemar Gonzaga, Humberto Mauro	Pablo Palitos, Paulo de Oliveira Gonçalves, Elsa Moreno	Musical comedy	
Ganga Bruta	Humberto Mauro	Durval Bellini, Dea Selva, Lu Marival	Drama	
Honra e ciúmes	Antonio Tibiriçá	Antonio Sorrentino, Amanda Leilop, Antonio Tibiriçá	Drama	
Onde a Terra Acaba	Octavio Gabus Mendes	Carmen Santos, Celso Montenegro, Augusta Guimarães	Drama	

== See also ==
- 1933 in Brazil
