= Twentieth Century Pictures =

American film production studio (1933–1935)

Twentieth Century Pictures, Inc.
- Industry: Film
- Founded: June 26, 1933; 93 years ago
- Founders: Joseph Schenck; Darryl F. Zanuck
- Defunct: May 31, 1935; 91 years ago
- Fate: Merged with Fox Film Corporation
- Successor: 20th Century-Fox

Twentieth Century Pictures, Inc. was an American independent Hollywood motion picture production company created in 1933 by Joseph Schenck (the former president of United Artists) and Darryl F. Zanuck from Warner Bros. Pictures (and co-founded by William Goetz from Fox Studios, and Raymond Griffith). The company product was distributed theatrically under United Artists (UA), and leased space at Samuel Goldwyn Studios.

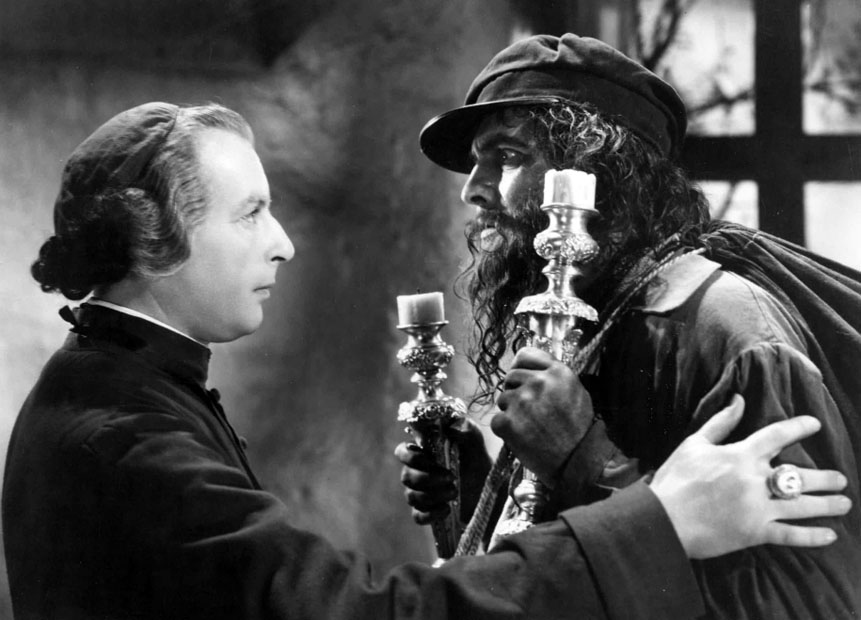
Cedric Hardwicke and Fredric March in Les Misérables

Schenck and Zanuck left UA over a stock dispute and began to negotiate with the Fox Film Corporation and the two companies merged that spring, becoming Twentieth Century-Fox in 1935.

== Formation ==
Following an industry salary dispute in 1933, Zanuck quit Warner Bros. in April when Warners refused to comply with the Academy of Motion Pictures Arts and Sciences' decision to restore salary cuts. On April 18, Zanuck announced that he and Schenck were planning a new production company with Schenck as President and Zanuck in charge of production. They planned to use United Artists' production facilities and release films through them. They soon announced that the company was to be called Twentieth Century Pictures Inc. and would start studio activities from June 1, 1933 and they planned to make 12 films, with the first three to start filming by the middle of July at the latest. In May, William Goetz was appointed as Zanuck's executive assistant and Raymond Griffith as production supervisor. The new company acquired Michael L. Simmons' book Chuck Connors, which became their first production. It was also their first release on October 7, 1933 under the title, The Bowery. Their initial stars under contract were George Arliss, Constance Bennett, Wallace Beery, George Raft and Loretta Young; however the Goetz connection meant that talent could be borrowed from MGM. Raoul Walsh, Gregory La Cava, Sidney Lanfield and Walter Lang were signed as directors.

Financial backing came from Schenck's younger brother Nicholas Schenck, president of Loew's, the theater chain that owned Metro-Goldwyn-Mayer (MGM), Louis B. Mayer of MGM, who wanted a position for his son-in-law, Goetz, Bank of America and Herbert J. Yates owner of the film processing laboratory Consolidated Film Industries, who later founded Republic Pictures Corporation in 1935.

== Releases ==
In addition to Chuck Connors, early stories purchased were Rowland Brown's Blood Money, Ralph Graves' Born to Be Bad and Nathanael West's Miss Lonelyhearts (released as Advice to the Lovelorn). The company was successful from the very beginning; out of their first 18 films, only one, Born to Be Bad, was not a financial success. Their 1934 production, The House of Rothschild was nominated for an Academy Award for Best Picture. In 1935, they produced the classic film Les Misérables, from Victor Hugo's novel, which was also nominated for Best Picture.

== Merger with Fox Film ==
In the winter of 1934, Zanuck began to negotiate with the UA board to acquire stock of the company and become a board member, but became outraged by UA's co-founder Mary Pickford's refusal to reward Twentieth Century with the company's stock, fearing it would have diluted the value of holdings by another UA stockholder and co-founder, D.W. Griffith. Schenck, who had been a UA stockholder for over ten years, resigned from United Artists in protest of the shoddy treatment of Twentieth Century, and Zanuck; thus began discussions with other distributors, which led to talks with the bankrupt Fox Studios of the Fox Film Corporation in the early spring of 1935. Fox Film had begun in the silent era in 1915 under founder William Fox.

Twentieth Century Pictures merged with Fox Studios in 1935 to form 20th Century-Fox (the hyphen was dropped half a century later in 1985 under Australian Rupert Murdoch), and in 2019 was acquired by The Walt Disney Company as part of Disney's acquisition of 20th Century Fox's owner and renamed "20th Century Studios" in 2020. For many years, 20th Century Fox claimed to have been founded in 1915 (the year Fox Film Corporation was founded). For instance, it marked 1945 as its 30th anniversary. However, in recent years it has now claimed the 1935 merger as its founding date.
