= Upton Sinclair Presents William Fox =

1933 book

- Author: Upton Sinclair
- Language: English
- Subject: William Fox
- Genre: Non-fiction
- Publication date: 1933
- Publication place: United States

Upton Sinclair Presents William Fox is a 1933 non-fiction work by the American writer Upton Sinclair. Sinclair based the book on a series of interviews he had conducted with William Fox, a former Hollywood film tycoon. The title was a reference to the screen credit "William Fox Presents" which appeared at the start of films.

Fox spoke on wide-ranging terms, particularly his childhood and his building of Fox Film into one of the major studios. Much of the book was devoted to detailing what he believed was a conspiracy by Wall Street to force him from control of Fox Film in 1930.

== Bibliography ==
- Krefft, Vanda. The Man Who Made the Movies: The Meteoric Rise and Tragic Fall of William Fox. HarperCollins, 2017.
- Solomon, Aubrey. The Fox Film Corporation, 1915-1935: A History and Filmography. McFarland, 2011.
