= William Fox (producer) =

Hungarian-born American film producer (1879–1952)

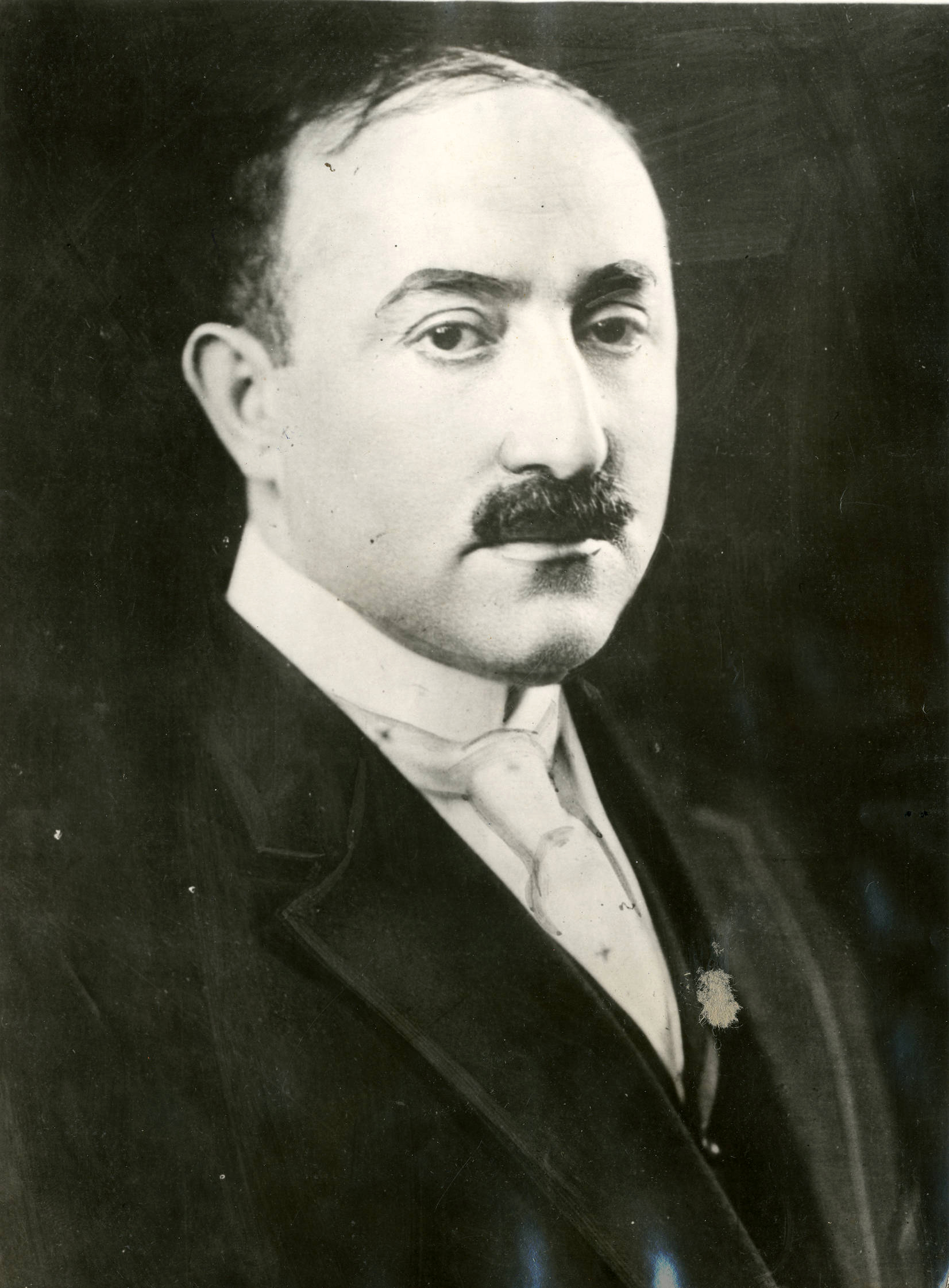
- Fox in 1921
- Born: Vilmos Fried; January 1, 1879; Tolcsva, Kingdom of Hungary, Austria-Hungary
- Died: May 8, 1952 (aged 73); New York City, U.S.
- Other name: Wilhelm Fried Fuchs
- Occupation: Entrepreneur
- Years active: 1900–1933
- Spouse: Eva Leo (m. 1899)
- Children: 2

Vilmos Fried (German: Wilhelm Fried Fuchs [fʊks]; 1879–1952), known professionally as William Fox, was a Hungarian-born American film industry executive who founded the Fox Film Corporation in 1915 and the Fox West Coast Theatres chain in the 1920s. Although he lost control of his film businesses in 1930, his name was used by 20th Century Fox (The Walt Disney Company) and continues to be used in the trademarks of the present-day Fox Corporation, including the Fox Broadcasting Company, Fox News, Fox Sports, and Foxtel.

== Early life ==
He was born in Tolcsva, Hungary. His parents, Michael Fuchs (Note: He was born Mihály Fuchs, and after emigrating to the United States, his name was anglicized to Michael Fuchs.) and Anna Fried, were both Hungarian Jews.

The family immigrated to the United States when William was nine months old and settled in New York City, where they had twelve more children, of whom only six survived. To help the family financially William found a job selling candy and newspapers in Central Park. At the age of eight, he fell off the back of an ice truck, breaking his left arm. This accident left him with a permanent impairment. He also found employment in the garment industry.

== Film career ==
In 1900 Fox started his own company, which he sold in 1904 to purchase his first nickelodeon. Always more of an entrepreneur than a showman, he concentrated on acquiring and building theaters. Following the purchase of that first nickelodeon, Fox then used it to create a chain of movie theaters and purchase film prints from major film companies at the time, such as Biograph, Essanay, Kalem, Lubin, Pathé, Selig, and Vitagraph. In 1910 Fox managed to successfully lease the New York Academy of Music and convert it into a movie theater. He also continued to focus on the New York and New Jersey markets. Beginning in 1914 New Jersey–based Fox bought films outright from the Balboa Amusement Producing Company in Long Beach, California, for distribution to his own theaters and then for rental to other theaters across the country. He formed the Fox Film Corporation on February 1, 1915, by replacing a few of his other studios with insurance and banking money provided by the McCarter, Kuser, and Usar families of Newark, New Jersey, and the small New Jersey investment house of Eisele and King. The company's first film studio was leased in Fort Lee, New Jersey, where many other early film studios were based at the beginning of the 20th century. He now had the capital to acquire facilities and expand his production capacity. Between 1915 and 1919 Fox raked in millions of dollars through films which featured Fox Film's first breakout star Theda Bara, known as "The Vamp", for her performance in A Fool There Was (1915). He also signed leading Western actor Tom Mix to his company in 1917, with the move significantly boosting Mix's popularity.

Between 1925 and 1926 Fox purchased the rights to the work of Freeman Harrison Owens; the U.S. rights to the Tri-Ergon system invented by three German inventors, Josef Engl (1893–1942), Hans Vogt (1890–1979), and Joseph Massolle (1889–1957); and the work of Theodore Case to create the Fox Movietone sound-on-film system, which was introduced in 1927 with the release of F. W. Murnau's Sunrise: A Song of Two Humans. Sound-on-film systems such as Movietone and RCA Photophone soon became the standard, and competing sound-on-disc technologies such as Warner Bros.' Vitaphone became obsolete. From 1928 to 1964 Fox Movietone News was one of the major newsreel series in the U.S., along with The March of Time (1935–1951) and Universal Newsreel (1929–1967). Despite the fact that his film studio was based in Hollywood, California, Fox opted to remain in New York instead, being more familiar with his financiers than with either his moviemakers or movie stars. Prominent Fox Film Corporation actress Janet Gaynor acknowledged that she barely knew William Fox, stating "I only met him to say 'How do you do?'." Gaynor also stated that he visited the Hollywood studio so rarely that his movies were mainly managed by the filmmakers.

Following the 1927 death of Marcus Loew, head of Loews Incorporated, the parent company of rival studio Metro-Goldwyn-Mayer, control of MGM passed to his longtime associate, Nicholas Schenck. Fox saw an opportunity to expand his empire, and in 1929 with Schenck's assent, he bought the Loew family's MGM holdings, unbeknownst to MGM studio bosses Louis B. Mayer and Irving Thalberg, who were outraged. Despite their high posts at MGM, they were not shareholders. Mayer used his strong political connections to persuade the Justice Department to sue Fox for violating federal antitrust laws. In July 1929 Fox was severely injured in an automobile accident. By the time he recovered, the stock market crash in October 1929 had wiped out virtually his entire fortune, ending any chance of the Loews-Fox merger going through even if the Justice Department had approved it.

Fox lost control of his organization in 1930 during a hostile takeover. In May 1935 Fox Film Corporation merged with Twentieth Century Pictures, creating Twentieth Century-Fox. William Fox was never connected with the ownership, production, or management of the movie studio that famously bore his name. A combination of the stock market crash, Fox's car accident injuries, and government antitrust action forced him into a protracted seven-year legal battle to stave off bankruptcy. At his bankruptcy hearing in 1936 he attempted to bribe judge John Warren Davis and committed perjury. In 1943 Fox served a five-month, seventeen-day prison sentence on charges of conspiring to obstruct justice and defraud the United States in connection with his bankruptcy. Years after his prison release, U.S. President Harry Truman granted Fox a Presidential pardon.

For many years Fox resented the way that Wall Street had forced him from control of his company. In 1933 he collaborated with the writer Upton Sinclair on a book, Upton Sinclair Presents William Fox, in which Fox recounted his life and stated his views on what he considered to be a large Wall Street conspiracy against him.

Fox died in 1952 at the age of 73. His death went largely unnoticed by the film industry; no one from Hollywood attended his funeral.

Fox personally oversaw the construction of many Fox Theatres in American cities including Atlanta, St Louis, Detroit, Portland, Oakland, San Francisco and San Diego.

His companies had an estimated value of $300,000,000, and he personally owned 53 percent of Fox Film and 93 percent of the Fox Theaters.

== Sources ==
- Gabler, Neal (1988). An Empire of Their Own: How the Jews Invented Hollywood. Crown. ISBN 0-385-26557-3.
