= Ulpiano Cos Villa =

Ulpiano Cos Villa (died December 22, 2014) was a Spanish-language sports broadcaster who called California Angels baseball games.

He worked for the Angels from 1983 to 1982. In addition, he was chosen by CBS to call the 1982 American League Championship Series, the 1984-1988 National League Championship Series and the 1984, 1985, 1987 and 1988 All-Star Games.

He worked alongside Ruben Valentin and Ángel Torres, among others.

He was born in Cuba. He died at a hospital in the Los Angeles area at the age of 79.
