= The White Rose (1933 film) =

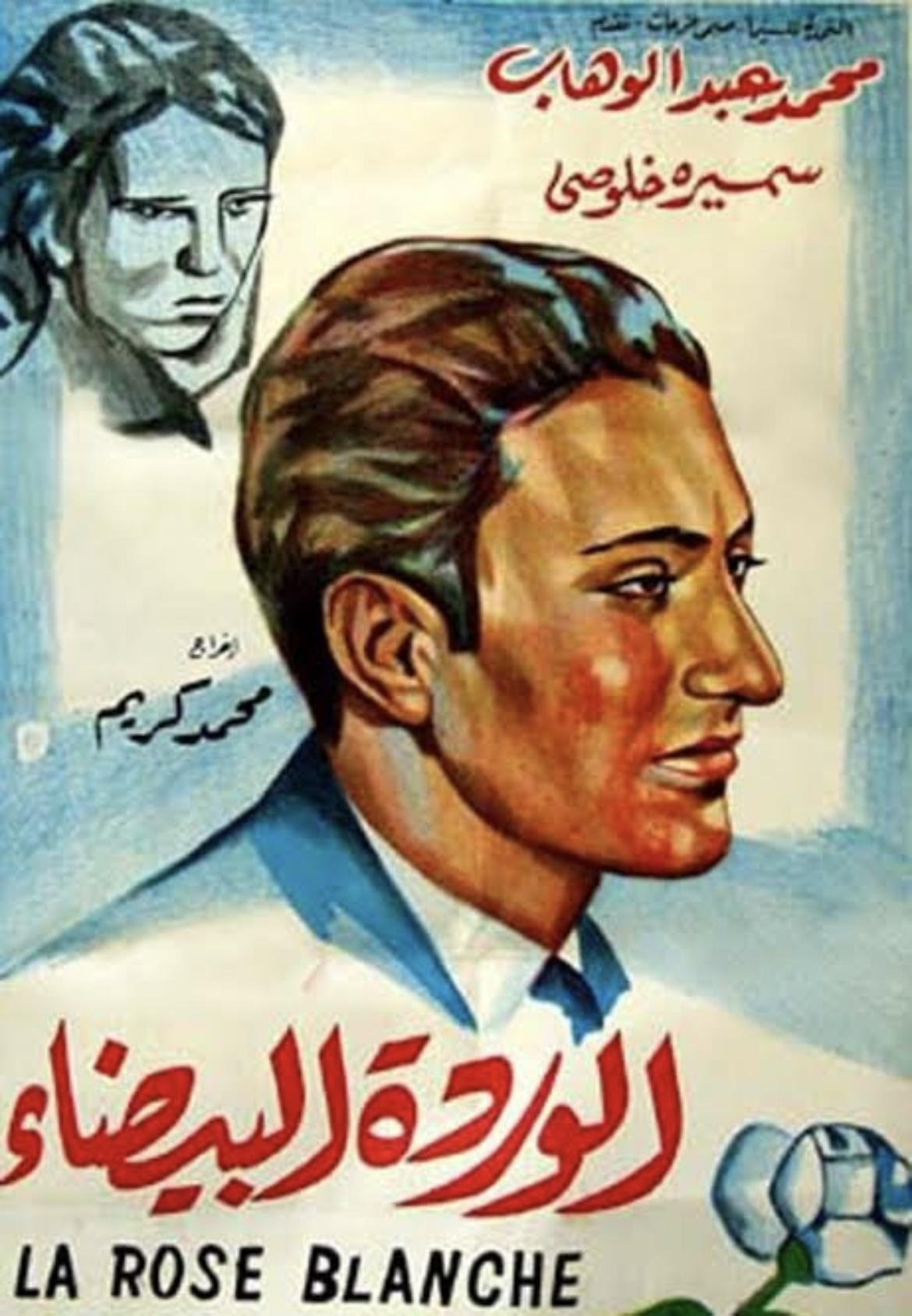
- Film poster
- Directed by: Mohammed Karim
- Written by: Suleiman Naguib; Tawfiq Al Mardanlli
- Starring: Mohammed Abdel Wahab; Dawlad Abiad; Samira Khouloussi; Suleiman Naguib
- Cinematography: Achille Primavera
- Music by: Ahmed Rami (Songs and lyrics)
- Production company: Cairophone recording company
- Release date: 4 December 1933 (Egypt)
- Running time: 110'
- Country: Egypt
- Language: Egyptian Arabic

The White Rose (Arabic: الوردة البيضاء, translit. Al Warda Al Baida) is a 1933 Egyptian musical romantic drama film directed by Mohammed Karim, the author of the silent film Zaynab. It was produced by Cairophon, the Egyptian branch or the Baidaphon recording company, and the second Egyptian musical film after Ounchoudat al-fouad (1932). The success of these led to the musical as the preferred genre of Egyptian cinema.

== Synopsis ==
The love relationship between Ragaa, the daughter of Ismail Pasha and Galal who works for her father became stronger. When Ismail finds out, he fires Galal. Galal becomes a singer, while Rajaa suffers from her stepmother who wants her to marry her brother, Shafik.

== Cast ==
- Mohammed Abdel Wahab
- Dawlat Abiad
- Samira Khouloussi
- Suleiman Naguib
- Zaki Rostom
- Saeed Abu Bakr
- Tawfiq Al Mardanlli
