= Fox Film =

American film production company (1915–1935)

Fox Film Corporation
- Final logo, used from 1931 to 1935
- Industry: Film
- Predecessors: Greater New York Film Rental Company; Box Office Attraction Company
- Founded: February 1, 1915; 111 years ago in Fort Lee, New Jersey, U.S.
- Founder: William Fox
- Defunct: May 31, 1935; 91 years ago
- Fate: Merged with Twentieth Century Pictures to form 20th Century-Fox
- Successor: 20th Century-Fox
- Subsidiaries: Fox-Case Corporation; Fox Movietone Corporation; Sunshine Comedy

Fox Film Corporation, also known as Fox Studios was an American independent company that produced motion pictures and was formed in 1915 by the theater "chain" pioneer William Fox. It was the corporate successor to his earlier Greater New York Film Rental Company and Box Office Attraction Company (founded 1913).

The company's first film studios were set up in Fort Lee, New Jersey, but in 1917, William Fox sent Sol M. Wurtzel to Hollywood, California, to oversee the studio's new West Coast production facilities, where the climate was more hospitable for filmmaking. On July 23, 1926, Fox Studios bought the patents of the Movietone sound system for recording sound onto film.

After the Wall Street crash of 1929, William Fox lost control of the company in 1930, during a hostile takeover. Under new president Sidney R. Kent, the new owners merged the company with Twentieth Century Pictures to form Twentieth Century-Fox Film Corporation, later 20th Century Studios in 1935.

== History ==
=== Background ===
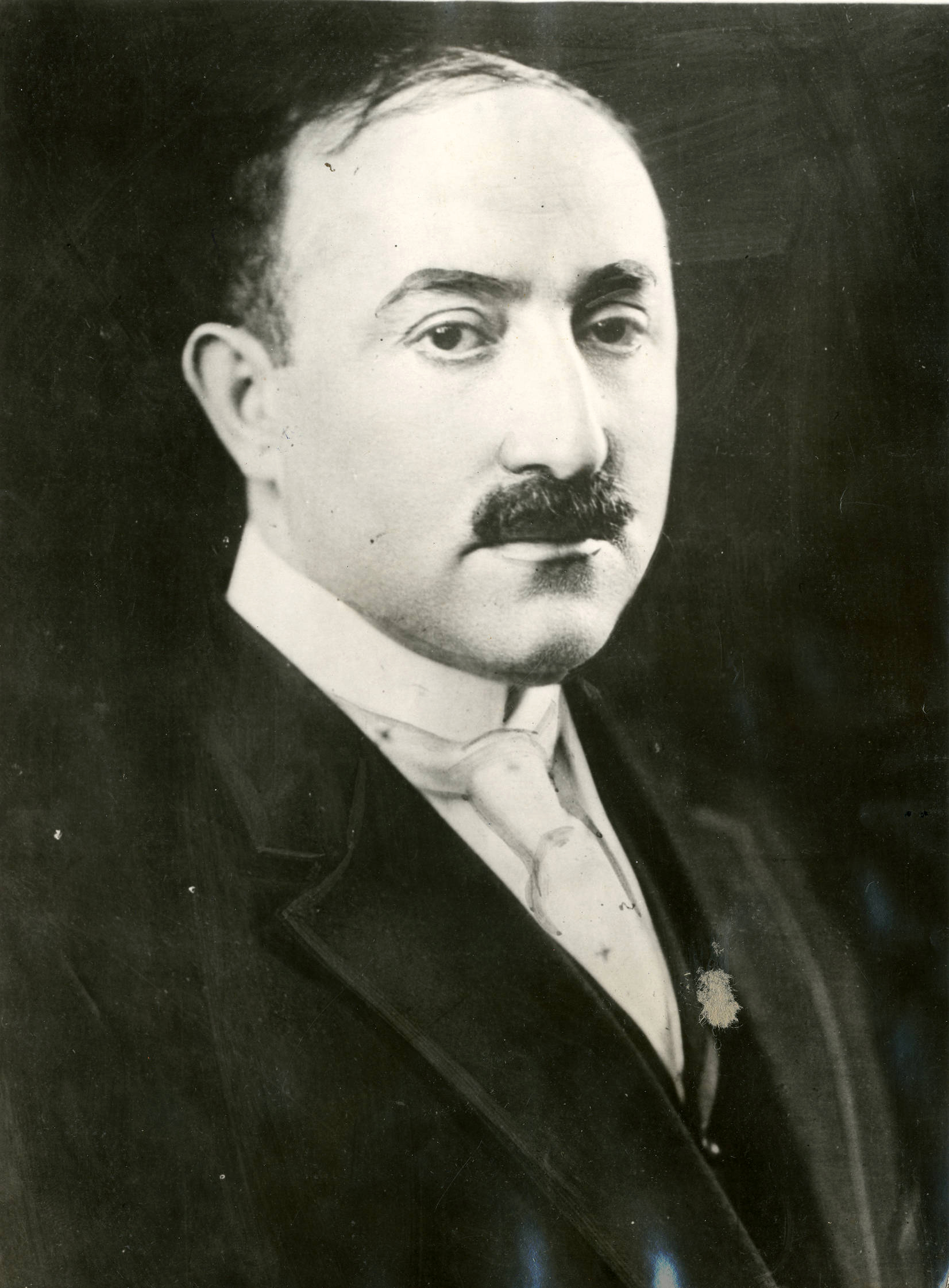
Founder William Fox

William Fox entered the film industry in 1904 when he purchased a one-third share of a Brooklyn nickelodeon for $1,667. (Note: $59,734 in 2025 dollars) He reinvested his profits from that initial location, expanding to fifteen similar venues in the city, and purchasing prints from the major studios of the time: Biograph, Essanay, Kalem, Lubin, Pathé, Selig, and Vitagraph. After experiencing further success presenting live vaudeville routines along with motion pictures, he expanded into larger venues beginning with his purchase of the disused Gaiety theater, (Note: Unrelated to the Broadway theatre operating at the same time, also called the Gaiety) and continuing with acquisitions throughout New York City and New Jersey, including the Academy of Music.

Fox invested further in the film industry by founding the Greater New York Film Rental Company as a film distributor. The major film studios responded by forming the Motion Picture Patents Company in 1908 and the General Film Company in 1910, in an effort to create a monopoly on the creation and distribution of motion pictures. Fox refused to sell out to the monopoly, and sued under the Sherman Antitrust Act, eventually receiving a $370,000 (Note: $12.1 million in 2025 dollars) settlement, and ending restrictions on the length of films and the prices that could be paid for screenplays.

In 1914, reflecting the broader scope of his business, he renamed it the Box Office Attraction Company. He entered into a contract with the Balboa Amusement Producing Company film studio, purchasing all of their films for showing in his New York area theaters and renting the prints to other exhibitors nationwide. He also continued to distribute material from other sources, such as Winsor McCay's early animated film Gertie the Dinosaur. Later that year, Fox concluded that it was unwise to be so dependent on other companies, so he purchased the Éclair studio facilities in Fort Lee, New Jersey, along with property in Staten Island, and arranged for actors and crew. The company became a film studio, using the name Box Office Attraction Company; its first release was Life's Shop Window.

=== Fox Film Corporation ===
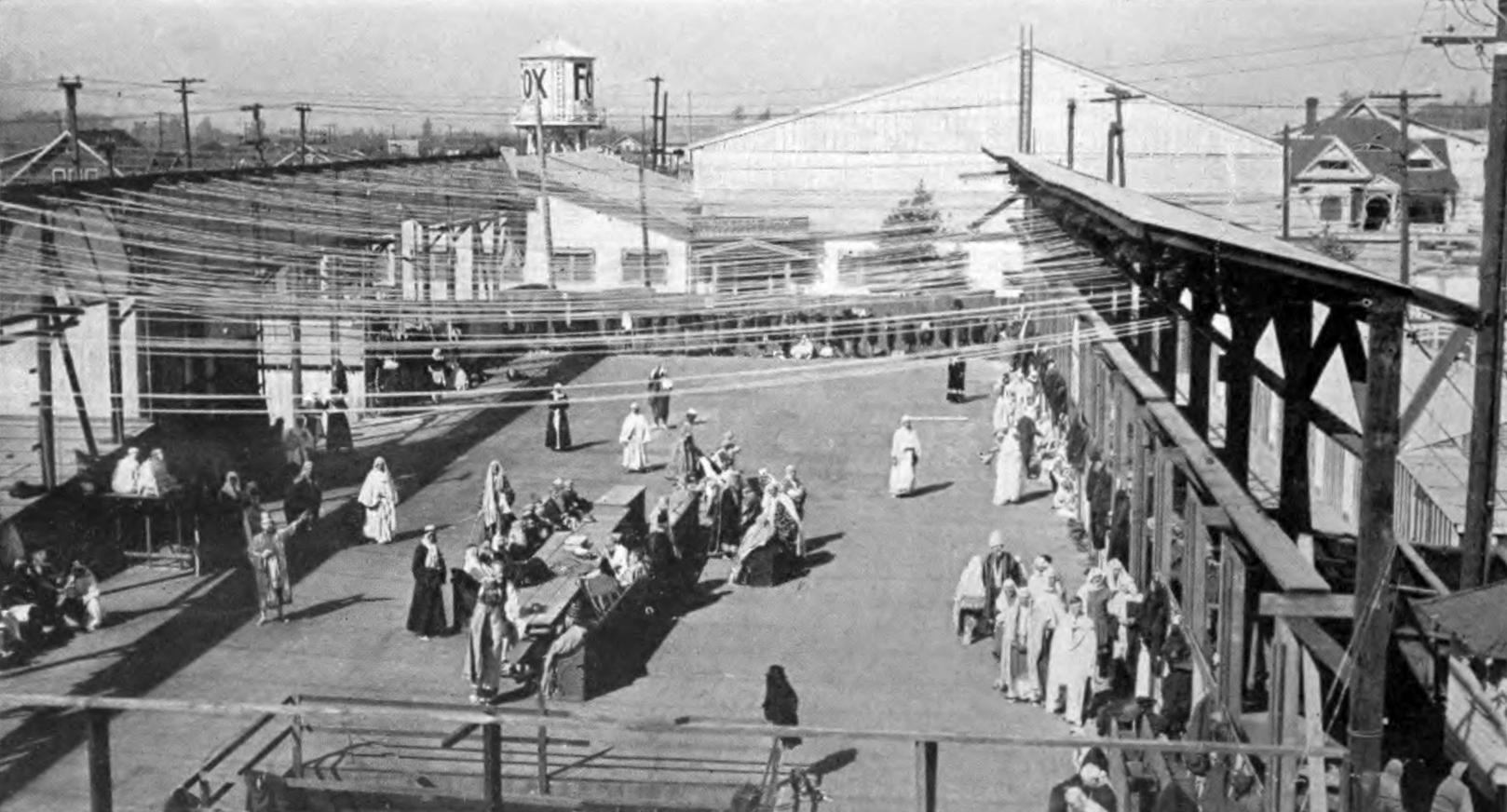
This large stage at the Fox Studio on North Western Avenue was used as the men's dressing room when more than 2,000 people were needed for the Jerusalem street scenes in Theda Bara's Salomé (1918)

Silent film The Heart Snatcher (1920) directed by Roy Del Ruth for Fox Film Corporation.

Always more of an entrepreneur than a showman, Fox concentrated on acquiring and building theaters; pictures were secondary. The company's first film studios were set up in Fort Lee where it and many other early film studios in America's first motion picture industry were based at the beginning of the 20th century.

That same year, in 1914, Fox Film began making motion pictures in California, and in 1915 decided to build its own permanent studio. The company leased the Los Angeles Edendale studio of the Selig Polyscope Company until its own studio, located at Western Avenue and Sunset Boulevard, was completed in 1916. In 1917, William Fox sent Sol M. Wurtzel to Hollywood to oversee the studio's West Coast production facilities where a more hospitable and cost-effective climate existed for filmmaking. Between 1915 and 1919, Fox Films earned millions of dollars through films featuring Theda Bara, known as "The Vamp" due to her unique ability to display exoticism. Fox also produced 85 films featuring lead Western actor Tom Mix, who joined Fox in 1917. The popularity of Mix's Western films earned Fox large sums of money, and he eventually was paid $17,000 per week.

With the introduction of sound technology, Fox moved to acquire the rights to a sound-on-film process. In the years 1925–26, Fox purchased the rights to the work of Freeman Harrison Owens, the U.S. rights to the Tri-Ergon system invented by three German inventors, and the work of Theodore Case. This resulted in the Movietone sound system later known as "Fox Movietone" developed at the Movietone Studio. Later that year, the company began offering films with a music-and-effects track, and the following year Fox began the weekly Fox Movietone News feature, that ran until 1963. The growing company needed space, and in 1926 Fox acquired 300 acres (1.2 km^{2}) in the open country west of Beverly Hills and built "Movietone City", the best-equipped studio of its time.

Because William Fox opted to remain in New York, much of the Hollywood filmmaking at the Fox Film Corporation was instead managed by Fox's movie makers. Janet Gaynor would also become one of the company's most prominent stars by the late 1920s.

=== Decline ===
When rival Marcus Loew died in 1927, Fox offered to buy the Loew family's holdings. Loew's Inc. controlled more than 200 theaters, as well as the Metro-Goldwyn-Mayer film studio. The Loew family agreed to the sale, and the merger of Fox and Loew's Inc. was announced in 1929. However, MGM studio bosses Louis B. Mayer and Irving Thalberg were not included in the deal; despite their status at MGM, they were only employees. Mayer and Thalberg fought back with their powerful political connections. Mayer called upon the Justice Department's antitrust unit to delay giving final approval to the merger. William Fox was badly injured in a car crash in the summer of 1929, and by the time he recovered, he had lost most of his fortune in the stock market crash of 1929, ending any chance of the Fox/Loew's merger being approved, even without the Justice Department's objections.

Overextended and close to bankruptcy, Fox was stripped of his empire in 1930 and later ended up in jail on bribery and perjury charges. Fox Film, with more than 500 theatres, was placed in receivership. A bank-mandated reorganization propped the company up for a time, but it soon became apparent that despite its size, Fox could not stand on its own. William Fox resented the way he was forced out of his company and portrayed it as an active conspiracy against him in the 1933 book Upton Sinclair Presents William Fox.

=== Merger and contemporary status ===
Under new president Sidney Kent, the new owners began negotiating with the upstart, but powerful independent Twentieth Century Pictures in the early spring of 1935. Twentieth Century had begun in the Samuel Goldwyn Studios in 1932 under founders Joseph Schenck and Darryl F. Zanuck. The two companies merged that spring of 1935 and became Twentieth Century-Fox. The company was purchased by News Corporation in 1985, becoming "20th Century Fox" without the hyphen, and in 2019 was acquired by The Walt Disney Company as part of Disney's purchase of 20th Century Fox's owner and was renamed 20th Century Studios in 2020. The Fox name, and the rights to most of its newsreel output, were retained by News Corporation's successor Fox Corporation. For many years, 20th Century-Fox claimed to have been founded in 1915; for instance, it marked 1945 as its 30th anniversary. However, in recent years it has claimed the 1935 merger as its founding, marking its 75th rather than 95th anniversary in 2010.

== Products ==
=== Feature films ===
A 1937 fire in a Fox film storage facility destroyed over 40,000 reels of negatives and prints, including the best-quality copies of every Fox feature produced prior to 1932; although copies located elsewhere allowed many to survive in some form, over 75% of Fox's feature films from before 1930 are completely lost.

=== Newsreels ===
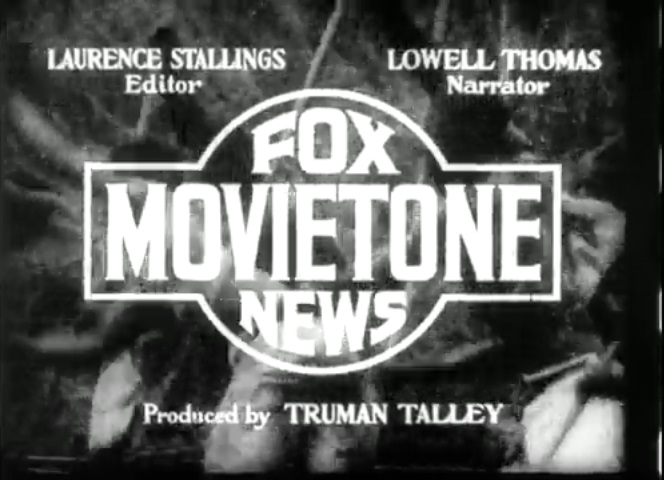
Title card from a 1935 Fox Movietone News newsreel

In 1919, Fox began a series of silent newsreels, competing with existing series such as Hearst Metrotone News, International Newsreel, and Pathé News. Fox News premiered on October 11, 1919, with subsequent issues released on the Wednesday and Sunday of each week. Fox News gained an advantage over its more established competitors when President Woodrow Wilson endorsed the newsreel in a letter, in what may have been the first time an American president commented on a film. In subsequent years, Fox News remained one of the major names in the newsreel industry by providing often-exclusive coverage of major international events, including reporting on Pancho Villa, the airship Roma, the Ku Klux Klan, and a 1922 eruption of Mount Vesuvius. The silent newsreel series continued until 1930.

In 1926, a subsidiary, Fox Movietone Corporation, was created, tasked with producing newsreels using Fox's recently acquired sound-on-film technology. The first of these newsreels debuted on January 21, 1927. Four months later, the May 25 release of a sound recording of Charles Lindbergh's departure on his transatlantic flight was described by film historian Raymond Fielding as the "first sound news film of consequence". Movietone News was launched as a regular newsreel feature December 3 of that year. Production of the series continued after the merger with Twentieth Century Pictures, until 1963, and continued to serve 20th Century Fox after that, as a source for film industry stock footage.

Unlike Fox's early feature films, the Fox News and Fox Movietone News libraries have largely survived. The earlier series and some parts of its sound successor are now held by the University of South Carolina, with the remaining Fox Movietone News still held by the company.

=== Serials ===
Fox Film briefly experimented with serial films, releasing the 15-episode Bride 13 and the 20-episode Fantômas in 1920. William Fox was unwilling to compromise on production quality in order to make serials profitable, however, and none were produced subsequently.

=== Short films ===
Hundreds of one- and two-reel short films of various types were also produced by Fox. Beginning in 1916, the Sunshine Comedy division created two-reel comedy shorts. Many of these, beginning with 1917's Roaring Lions and Wedding Bliss, starring Lloyd Hamilton, were slapstick, intended to compete with Mack Sennett's popular offerings. Sunshine releases continued until the introduction of sound. Other short film series included Imperial Comedies, Van Bibber Comedies (with Earle Foxe), O'Henry, Married Life of Helen and Warren, and Fox Varieties. Fox's expansion into Spanish-language films in the early 1930s also included shorts.

== Bibliography ==
- Canemaker, John (2005). Winsor McCay: His Life and Art (Revised ed.). Abrams Books. ISBN 978-0-8109-5941-5.
- Crafton, Donald (1993). Before Mickey: The Animated Film 1898–1928. University of Chicago Press. ISBN 978-0-226-11667-9.
- Fielding, Raymond (2011) [1972]. The American Newsreel: A Complete History, 1911–1967 (2nd ed.). McFarland. ISBN 978-0-7864-6610-8.
- Golden, Eve (1996). Vamp: The Rise and Fall of Theda Bara. Vestal Press. ISBN 978-1-879511-32-3.
- Shepherd, David J. (2013). The Bible on Silent Film: Spectacle, Story and Scripture in the Early Cinema. Cambridge University Press. ISBN 978-1-107-04260-5.
- Slide, Anthony (2001). The New Historical Dictionary of the American Film Industry (2nd ed.). Scarecrow Press. ISBN 978-1-57886-015-9.
- Solomon, Aubrey (2014). The Fox Film Corporation, 1915–1935: A History and Filmography. McFarland & Company. ISBN 978-0-7864-6286-5.
