= Cláudio Ulpiano =

Cláudio Ulpiano Santos Nogueira Itagiba (14 November 1932 – 4 January 1999) was a Brazilian philosopher and expert on the work of Gilles Deleuze. He taught at the Universidade do Estado do Rio de Janeiro and Fluminense Federal University.

== Bibliography ==
- Do saber em Platão e do sentido nos estóicos como reversão do platonismo. Dissertação de Mestrado.
- O Pensamento de Deleuze ou a Grande Aventura do Espírito . Tese de Doutorado.
- Mundo Próprio - Primeiro Movimento

== Link ==
- www.claudioulpiano.org.br
