= Rodolfo Teófilo =

Brazilian writer, poet, pharmacist, and sanitarian

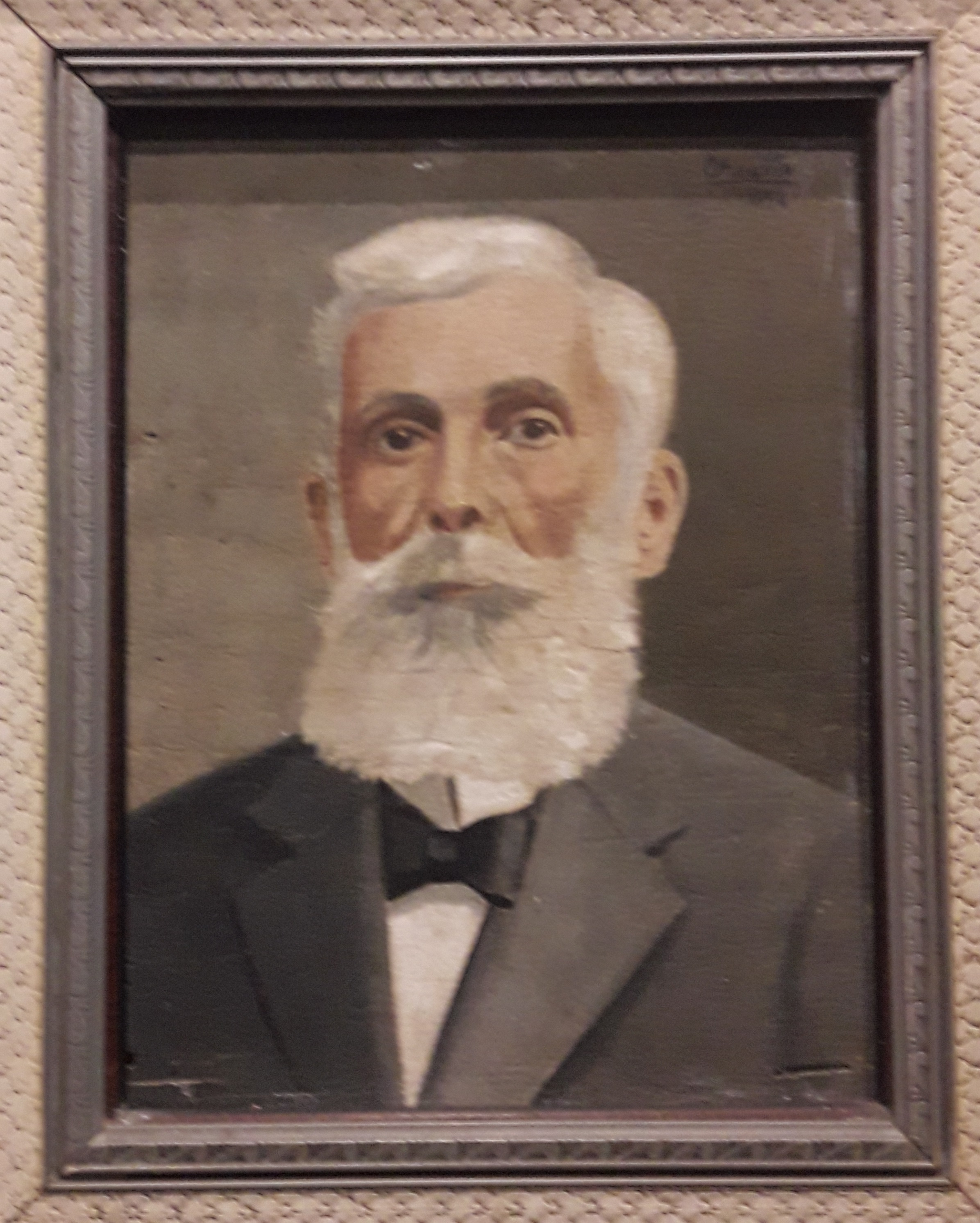
- Born: 6 May 1853
- Died: 2 July 1932 (aged 79)

Rodolfo Marcos Teófilo (6 May 1853 – 2 July 1932) was a Brazilian writer, poet, pharmacist, and sanitarian.
