= Ganga Bruta =

1933 film

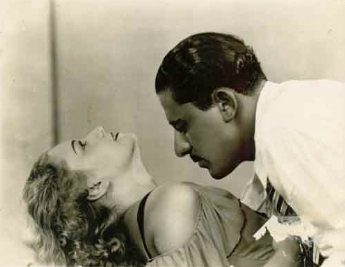
- Déa Selva and Durval Bellini in Ganga Bruta
- Directed by: Humberto Mauro
- Written by: Humberto Mauro; Otávio Gabus Mendes
- Produced by: Adhemar Gonzaga
- Starring: Durval Bellini; Déa Selva; Lu Marival; Décio Murillo
- Cinematography: Afrodísio Pereira de Castro; Paulo Morano
- Edited by: Humberto Mauro
- Music by: Radamés Gnattali
- Production company: Cinédia
- Distributed by: Cinédia
- Release date: May 29, 1933
- Running time: 82 minutes
- Country: Brazil
- Language: Portuguese

Ganga Bruta (literally "Brutal Gang"; also known as Rough Diamond) is a 1933 Brazilian drama film directed by Humberto Mauro. Starring Durval Bellini and Déa Selva, it follows a man who, after killing his wife on their wedding night, moves to a city where he becomes part of a love triangle. It was produced between 1931 and 1932 for Adhemar Gonzaga at his studio Cinédia.

On its initial release, the film was highly criticized and its poor viewing figures resulted in financial losses for the distribution company, but later critics and film directors expressed praise for it. Cinema Novo's Glauber Rocha considered it to be one of the best Brazilian films of all time, a title that would be recognized by the Brazilian Film Critics Association in 2015.

== Plot ==
Marcos, a rich engineer, discovers on his wedding night that his bride was not a virgin and murders her in the bridal chamber. Despite the sensation caused in the media by the resultant case, Marcos is acquitted and moves to Guaraíba in an attempt to put the affair behind him. He finds a job managing the construction of a factory and becomes a co-worker of Décio, who lives with his paralyzed mother and Sônia, his adoptive sister. Sônia, who is engaged to Décio, is attracted to Marcos and although he is initially unaware of her feelings, he eventually acknowledges that he has fallen in love with her. After discovering that Marcos has seduced Sônia, Décio swears to kill him, but a fight culminates in Décio's death instead. At the end of the film, Marcos and Sônia get married.

== Cast ==
- Durval Bellini as Marcos
- Déa Selva as Sônia
- Lu Marival as Marcos' wife
- Décio Murillo as Décio
- Andréa Duarte as Décio's mother
- Alfredo Nunes as butler
- Ivan Villar as servant

== Production ==
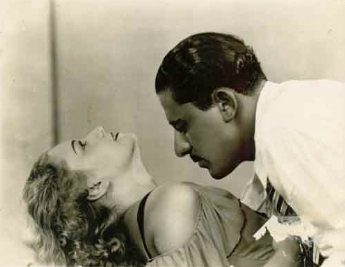
Durval Bellini and Déa Selva were the main actors in Ganga Bruta

The film was initially called Dança das Chamas (lit. "Dance of Flames"). Raul Schnoor, Tamar Moema, and Ruth Gentil were planned to take starring roles, with shooting taking place in Amazonas and Pará. The film was eventually shot with a different cast in Ilha das Cobras and Quinta da Boa Vista, in the city of Rio de Janeiro, and in Guaxindiba, São Gonçalo, Rio de Janeiro between September 2, 1931 and October 21, 1932, using a hand-held camera.

Ganga Bruta was the sixth feature film directed by Humberto Mauro and his second for film studio Cinédia, a company owned by Adhemar Gonzaga. Gonzaga, who was the film producer, conceived it as a silent film with a score recorded on disk and synchronized to the film during its exhibition. When it was almost finished, however, Gonzaga agreed to adding voices recorded on Vitaphone, a change prompted by the advent of sound films and their rise in popularity in the Brazilian market during the production of the film.

== Reception and analysis ==
The film was first released on May 29, 1933 in the Alhambra cinema in Rio de Janeiro. It was not well received on its release; Ganga Bruta was labeled "the worst film of all time" by critics and resulted in "huge financial losses" for Cinédia. Time Out Rio de Janeiro stated that "It was roundly rejected by traditional critics and short-sighted viewers." Opinions were revised after its restoration in 1952 for a screening at the 1st Brazilian Cinema Retrospective, when it "deeply impressed" the directors who would be part of Cinema Novo movement in the 1960s and 1970s. For example, Glauber Rocha was especially impressed and later cited it as "one of the 20 best films of all time" in his book Revisão Crítica do Cinema Brasileiro. Another film director, Walter Lima Jr., declared, "there are two films that are such clear archetypes of Brazil's eternal quest, namely Limite and Ganga Bruta. They represent something that you have to polish and something that determines its own space, suggesting at the same time that something more exists beyond its confines." In 2015 it would be further recognized by the Brazilian Film Critics Association as the 24th best Brazilian film of all time on its Top 100.

I used, as in silent film, symbols and inferences, which earned me the nickname of the Freud of Cascadura [a district of Rio]. When Freud fever took hold, I read everything he wrote that I could get hold of. I tried to see what could be applied to the cinema. In Ganga Bruta I wanted to see if I could create some Freudian effects, principally by means of the phallic symbols, like cranes, vertical camera movements, objects and composition of shots.

— Humberto Mauro

Randal Johnson and Robert Stam, writers of Brazilian Cinema, called the film "Mauro's masterpiece", saying that it "creatively melds the cinematic styles of expressionism and Soviet montage". Encyclopedia of Contemporary Latin American and Caribbean Cultures's Daniel Balderston, Mike Gonzalez and Ana M. Lopez wrote that the film is "magisterial", combining lyricism, naturalism and expressionism. Writing in South American Cinema: A Critical Filmography, Peter Rist praised its music, saying "Mauro's audio-visual mélange" has a "full lyrical effect". Georges Sadoul, author of Dictionary of Films, noted that "despite its silly and conventional plot, this [is] Humberto Mauro's best film and a landmark in the history of Brazilian cinema." Sadoul suggested the industrial elements were used as "erotic symbols", and compared a scene to Luis Buñuel's film Él. French critic Jacques Lourcelles asserted the main theme of Ganga Bruta is violence, alongside which is "an atmosphere of both carnal and cosmic eroticism". Writing for the book Le cinéma brésilien, Carlos Roberto de Souza commented that "there are Freudian and surreal echoes" in the film.
