= List of avant-garde films before 1930 =

A list of avant-garde and experimental films made before 1930. Though some had dedicated music scores written for them, or were synchronized to records, nearly all of these films were silent. Several of them involve color, through tinting, hand-painting or even photographic color.

== List ==
Title	Director	Cast	Country	Subgenre/Notes
1900
A Nymph of the Waves	Frederick S. Armitage	Cathrina Barto	United States	Early use of optical printing
1901
The Ghost Train	Frederick S. Armitage		United States	Use of overprinting; section shown in negative
Star Theatre	Frederick S. Armitage		United States	a.k.a. "Building Up and Demolishing the Star Theatre." Single-frame, time-lapse subject
1903
The Infernal Cake Walk	Georges Méliès		France	Ghostly, in-camera superimpositions
Down the Hudson	Frederick S. Armitage, A.E. Weed		United States	Single-frame, time-lapse travel actually "up" the Hudson River
1905
Interior NY Subway, 14th Street to 42nd Street	Billy Bitzer		United States	Shot from front of subway car, largely abstract
1906
The '?' Motorist	Walter R. Booth		United Kingdom	Exceptional trick film in the style of Georges Méliés. Produced by R. W. Paul.
1907
Les Kiriki - Acrobates Japonaises	Segundo de Chomón		France	Exceptional trick film, shot from the ceiling facing downward
1908
Fantasmagorie	Émile Cohl		France	Early animation, reflective of the pre-modernist movement of the Incoherents
1910
The Hasher's Delerium	Émile Cohl		France	Early animation; representation of a hallucination
1911
The Automatic Moving Company	Romeo Bosetti and/or Émile Cohl		France	Often attributed to Émile Cohl; recent scholarship points toward Bosetti.
A Chord of Color	Bruno Corra, Arnaldo Ginna		Italy	Abstract animation, Lost film
Study on the Effects of Four Colors	Bruno Corra, Arnaldo Ginna		Italy	Abstract animation, Lost film
Translation of Mallarmé's poem "Flowers" into Colors	Bruno Corra, Arnaldo Ginna		Italy	Abstract animation, Lost film
Translation of Mendelssohn's Spring Song	Bruno Corra, Arnaldo Ginna		Italy	Abstract animation, Lost film
1912
The Dance	Bruno Corra, Arnaldo Ginna		Italy	Abstract animation, Lost film
The Rainbow	Bruno Corra, Arnaldo Ginna		Italy	Abstract animation, Lost film
1913
Rythmes colorés (Coloured Rhythm)	Léopold Survage		France	Abstract animation; ca. 105 drawings made but not filmed
Suspense	Phillips Smalley, Lois Weber	Valentine Paul, Lois Weber	United States	Contains early examples of split-screen and a car chase.
1914
Drama in the Futurist's Cabinet No. 13	Vladimir Kasyanov	Mikhail Larionov, Natalia Goncharova, David Burliuk	Russia	Lost film
1915
La Folie du Docteur Tube	Abel Gance	Albert Dieudonné	France	Archaic trick film, shot through Anamorphic lens
Hypocrites	Lois Weber	Courtenay Foote, Myrtle Stedman	United States	Allegorical and highly symbolic religious picture; nude principal character
The Picture of Dorian Gray	Vsevolod Meyerhold, Mikhail Doronin	Vavara Yanova, Vsevolod Meyerhold	Russia	Adaptation of Oscar Wilde story by symbolist theater director; Lost film
1916
Diana the Huntress	Charles W. Allen, Francis Trevelyan Miller	Lionel Braham, Percy Richards	United States	Highly stylized mythic film; fragment only
Intolerance	D. W. Griffith	Lillian Gish, Robert Harron	United States	Influential film which attempts to tell four stories at once; extensive use of montage
The Strong Man	Vsevolod Meyerhold	Mikhail Doronin, Vsevolod Meyerhold	Russia	Adaptation of Stanisław Przybyszewski play by symbolist theater director; Lost film
1917
Thaïs	Anton Giulio Bragaglia	Thaïs Galizsky	Italy	Italian Futurist film; incomplete print extant.
Vita futurista	Arnaldo Ginna	Filippo Marinetti, Giacomo Balla	Italy	Italian futurist film; Lost film
1918
Âmes des fous	Germaine Dulac	Sylvio de Pedrelli, Ève Francis	France	Serial which incorporated avant-garde techniques; lost film.
The Blue Bird	Maurice Tourneur	Tula Belle, Robin Macdougall	United States	Stylized, almost surrealistic, fantasy film
Nye dlya deneg radivshisya (Born Not for the Money)	Nikandr Turkin	Vladimir Mayakovsky, David Burliuk	Soviet Union	Russian futurist adaptation of Jack London story Lost film
Il Perfido Incanto	Anton Giulio Bragaglia	Renée Avril, Thaïs Galizsky	Italy	Lost Italian Futurist film.
Prunella	Maurice Tourneur	Isabel Berwin, Jules Raucourt	United States	Stylized, almost surrealistic, fantasy film; only a 30-minute fragment extant
The Young Lady and the Hooligan	Vladimir Mayakovsky, Yevgeni Slavinsky	Fyodor Dunayev, Vladimir Mayakovsky, Aleksandra Rebikova	Soviet Union	The only surviving film appearance by arch-Russian futurist Vladimir Mayakovsky
1919
The Fall of Babylon	D. W. Griffith	Constance Talmadge, Alfred Paget	United States	Edited from Intolerance, widely influential in Europe; introduced 'Russian montage' to Russia
Rose-France	Marcel L'Herbier	Claude-France Aïssé, Jacque Catelain	France	Symbolic romance
Deviy Gory	Alexander Sanin		RSFSR	
1920
Anywhere Out of the World	Dudley Murphy	Chase Harringdine	United States	Dance film, Lost film
Aphrodite	Dudley Murphy	Katharine Hawley	United States	Dance film, Lost film
The Cabinet of Dr. Caligari	Robert Wiene	Conrad Veidt, Lil Dagover	Weimar Republic	Expressionist horror film, greatly influential on avant-garde filmmakers, particularly in the United States
La Fête espagnole	Germaine Dulac	Ève Francis, Gaston Modot	France	First film written by Louis Delluc
From Morn to Midnight	Karlheinz Martin	Ernst Deutsch	Weimar Republic	Adaptation of Expressionist play, only film made by theatre director Martin; barred from German cinemas at the time
Genuine	Robert Wiene	Fern Andra, Hans Heinrich von Twardowski	Weimar Republic	Particularly extreme example of Expressionism
Nude Woman by Waterfall	Claude Friese-Greene		United Kingdom	Dance film.
Le silence	Louis Delluc	Ève Francis, Gabriel Signoret	France	Naturalist, experimental short
The Soul of the Cypress	Dudley Murphy	Chase Harringdine	United States	Dance film
1921
El Dorado	Marcel L'Herbier	Ève Francis, Jacque Catelain	France	Melodrama, highly stylized sets and use of montage
Fièvre	Louis Delluc	Ève Francis, Gaston Modot	France	Naturalist melodrama
Manhatta	Paul Strand, Charles Sheeler		United States	First City film
Opus 1	Walter Ruttmann		Weimar Republic	Abstract Animation
Opus 2	Walter Ruttmann		Weimar Republic	Abstract Animation
Rhythmus 21	Hans Richter		Weimar Republic	Abstract animation. Backdated by Richter, not actually completed or screened in 1921.
1922
Danse macabre	Dudley Murphy	Adolph Bolm, Ruth Page	United States	Dance film
The Enchanted City	Warren Newcombe		United States	Art heavy futurist short
La femme de nulle part	Louis Delluc	Ève Francis, Gine Avril	France	Naturalist melodrama
Der Sieger	Walter Ruttmann		Weimar Republic	Semi-abstract advertising film
1923
Cœur fidèle	Jean Epstein	Léon Mathot, Gina Manès	France	Naturalist melodrama, experimental sequence; cited in Curtis
Dnevnik Glumova (Glumov's Diary)	Sergei Eisenstein	Grigori Alexandrov, Sergei Eisenstein	Soviet Union	Filmed inserts for The Wise Man, a production of the Moscow Proletkult Central Theater; issued as part of Kino Pravda No. 16
L'ironie du Destin	Dimitri Kirsanoff	Dimitri Kirsanoff, Nadia Sibirskaïa	France	Naturalist melodrama; Lost film
The Man Without Desire	Adrian Brunel	Ivor Novello	United Kingdom	Fantasy, cited by Rotha
La mort du soleil	Germaine Dulac	André Nox, Denis Lorys	France	Social drama, experimental techniques
Le Retour à la Raison	Man Ray	Alice Prin (Kiki de Montparnasse)	France	Insert film for a Dadist soirée
La Roue	Abel Gance	Séverin-Mars, Ivy Close	France	Lengthy melodrama utilizing extensive segments of "Russian montage"
La Souriante Madame Beudet	Germaine Dulac	Germaine Dermoz, Alexandre Arquillière	France	Social drama, experimental techniques. Considered one of the first feminist films. Premiered 9 November 1923.
The Crazy Ray	René Clair	Henri Rollan, Charles Martinelli	France	Surrealist comedy with science-fiction angle
Rhythmus 23	Hans Richter		Weimar Republic	Abstract animation. Several scholars have shown that Richter likely backdated his film; this was probably made at least several years later.
Salomé	Charles R. Bryant	Alla Nazimova, Mitchell Lewis	United States	Art Nouveau rendering of biblical story based on Aubrey Beardsley
Sea of Dreams	Warren Newcombe	Hazel Lindsley	United States	Futuristic fantasy; Lost film
1924
The Adventures of Oktyabrina	Grigori Kozintsev, Leonid Trauberg	Zinaida Torkhovskaya, Yevgeni Kumeiko	Soviet Union	First production of FEKS; lost film
Aelita: Queen of Mars	Iakov Protazanov	Igor Ilyinsky, Mikhail Zharov	Soviet Union	Science-fiction film with Constructivist and Futurist sets.
Ballet Mécanique	Fernand Léger, Dudley Murphy	Alice Prin	France	Cubist film, with music score by George Antheil
Entr'acte	René Clair	Alice Prin, Francis Picabia, Erik Satie, Man Ray, Marcel Duchamp	France	Dadaist insert film for Erik Satie's ballet Relâche
The Fugitive Futurist	Gaston Quiribet		United Kingdom	Comedy featuring "melting" wipe effect; futuristic projections on travel
L'Inhumaine	Marcel L'Herbier	Georgette Leblanc, Jacque Catelain	France	Highly stylized science fiction feature
Interplanetary Revolution	Nikolai Khodotaev, Zenon Komisarenko, Yuri Merkolov		Soviet Union	Satire of Protazanov's Aelita: Queen of Mars
Kino-Eye	Dziga Vertov		Soviet Union	
Opus III	Walter Ruttmann		Weimar Republic	Abstract animation
Au secours!	Abel Gance	Max Linder, Jean Toulout	France	Horror-comedy, highly experimental in style
Symphonie Diagonale	Viking Eggeling		Sweden	Abstract animation; in production from 1921.
Soviet Toys	Dziga Vertov		Soviet Union	Satirical animation and advertising
1925
Les aventures de Robert Macaire	Jean Epstein	Jean Angelo, Alex Allin	France	Fantasy serial, cited in Rotha
Battleship Potemkin	Sergei Eisenstein	Aleksandr Antonov, Grigori Alexandrov	Soviet Union	"Odessa Steps" sequence is a textbook example of Russian montage
La fille de l'eau	Jean Renoir	Catherine Hessling, Pierre Champagne	France	Naturalist drama, surrealist influenced
Jean Cocteau fait du cinéma	Jean Cocteau	Jean Cocteau	France	16mm short, Lost film
KIPHO	Julius Pinschewer, Guido Seeber		Weimar Republic	Trailer for International Film Congress of Berlin, 1925
Lebende Buddhas	Paul Wegener	Paul Wegener, Asta Nielsen	Weimar Republic	Fragment only; fragment is more experimental than Expressionist
Opus IV	Walter Ruttmann		Weimar Republic	Abstract animation
The Pottery Maker	Robert J. Flaherty		United States	Semi-documentary, experimental in style
A Quoi revent les jeunes films?	Henri Chomette, Man Ray		France	Lost film. Made as a collaboration between Chomette and Ray; later sub-divided into three different films.
Rebus Film Nr. 1	Paul Leni		Weimar Republic	Semi-abstract filmed puzzle, part of a series of eight films
Rhythmus 25	Hans Richter		Weimar Republic	Abstract animation; Lost film
Strike	Sergei Eisenstein		Soviet Union	
Stromlinien	Oskar Fischinger		Weimar Republic	Abstract animation
The Way	Francis Brugière	Sebastian Droste, Rosalinde Fuller	United States	Unrealized project, dated by Rotha to 1923 and often dated to 1929; 1925 is correct
1926
Anémic cinéma	Marcel Duchamp		France	Dadaist semi-animated film
Cinq minutes de cinéma pur	Henri Chomette		France	Extract from A Quoi revent les jeunes films?
Jeux des reflets et de la vitesse	Henri Chomette		France	Extract from A Quoi revent les jeunes films?
Ménilmontant	Dimitri Kirsanoff		France	Urban realist melodrama
Filmstudie	Hans Richter		Weimar Republic	Merger between abstract animation and photographic abstraction
Moonland	Neil McGuire, William A. O'Connor	Mickey McBan	United States	Fantasy short, surrealist sets & situations
Mother	Vsevolod Pudovkin	Vera Baranovskaya, Nikolai Batalov	Soviet Union	Gripping social realist drama, heavy use of montage
A Page of Madness	Teinosuke Kinugasa	Masuo Inoue, Yoshie Nakagawa	Japan	Surreal, intense representation of insanity using highly advanced film techniques.
Raumlichtkunst series	Oskar Fischinger		Weimar Republic	Abstract animation; multiple projector performances. Reconstructed 2012 by CVM in HD as a three projector installation.
Rien que les heures	Alberto Cavalcanti	Blanche Bernis, Nina Chousvalowa	France	City film
Secrets of a Soul	G. W. Pabst	Werner Krauss, Ruth Weyher	Weimar Republic	Co-written with psychoanalysts Karl Abraham and Hanns Sachs, with dream sequence and sets by Ernő Metzner.
A Sixth Part of the World	Dziga Vertov		Soviet Union	
Spirals	Oskar Fischinger		Weimar Republic	Abstract Animation; incorporates footage made several years earlier
Le voyage imaginaire	René Clair	Dolly Davis, Jean Bõrlin	France	Fantasy film with surrealist elements
Wax Experiments	Oskar Fischinger		Weimar Republic	Abstract Animation; incorporates footage going back to c. 1921
1927
Bed and Sofa	Abram Room	Nikolai Batalov, Vladimir Fogel, Lyudmila Semyonova	Soviet Union	Written by Viktor Shklovsky
Berlin: Symphony of a Great City	Walter Ruttmann		Weimar Republic	City film
City Film	Ralph Steiner		United States	Amateur City film
Combat de Boxe	Charles Dekeukeleire		Belgium	Staging of boxing match, based on poem by Paul Werrie
Emak-Bakia	Man Ray	Alice Prin	France	Extract from A Quoi revent les jeunes films?
The End of St. Petersburg	Vsevolod Pudovkin, Mikhail Doller	Aleksandr Chistyakov, Vera Baranovskaya	Soviet Union	Historic epic
La Glace à trois faces (The Three-Sided Mirror)	Jean Epstein	Raymond Guérin-Catelain, Jeanne Helbling	France	Avant-garde projection of a narrative romance.
Les Halles centrales	Boris Kaufman		France	City film
L'invitation au voyage	Germaine Dulac	Emma Gynt, Raymond Dubreuil	France	Impressionistic "Cinéma pur"
Die Landpartie	Alex Strasser		Weimar Republic	Animated "grotesque"
Loony Lens	Al Brick		United States	Anamorphic views; insert series to Fox Movietone newsreels, begun 1924, only 4 known,
La marche des machines	Eugène Deslaw		France	Semi-abstract art film of machinery; filmed by Boris Kaufman
München-Berlin Wanderung	Oskar Fischinger		Weimar Republic	Photographic single-frame film. Not released until decades later.
Napoléon	Abel Gance	Albert Dieudonné, Antonin Artaud	France	Enormous historic epic, experimental techniques and multi-screen
Magic Umbrella	Jerome Hill		United States	Genre parody, filmed in Rome; color and sound added in 1965
Orgelstabe	Oskar Fischinger		Weimar Republic	Abstract animation; series of experiments made over several years.
La p'tite Lili	Alberto Cavalcanti	Catherine Hessling, Jean Renoir	France	Naturalist short, street film
Prelude	Castleton Knight		United Kingdom	Experimental projection of Edgar Allan Poe's The Premature Burial, conventionally framed.
En rade	Alberto Cavalcanti	Pierre Batcheff, Blanche Bernis	France	Urban realist melodrama
Seelische Konstruktionen	Oskar Fischinger		Weimar Republic	Abstract animation.
Sur un air de Charleston	Jean Renoir	Catherine Hessling, Johnny Hudgins	France	Silly, surrealist dance short with sci-fi elements
Le train sans yeux	Alberto Cavalcanti	Hans Mierendorff, Gina Manès	France	Written by Louis Delluc
Vieux châteaux	Eugène Deslaw	Zet Molan	France	Artful semi-documentary
Wing Beat	Kenneth MacPherson		United Kingdom	
Your Acquaintance	Lev Kuleshov	Pyotr Galadzhev, Aleksandra Khokhlova, Yuri Vasilchikov	Soviet Union	Art direction by Aleksandr Rodchenko. Only a fragment survives.
1928
L'Argent	Marcel L'Herbier	Brigitte Helm, Alfred Abel	France	Experimental, modernized treatment of Zola novel
Blue Bottles	Ivor Montagu	Elsa Lanchester, Joe Beckett	United Kingdom	Hybrid of experimental style and slapstick comedy
De Brug (The Bridge)	Joris Ivens		Netherlands	
Celles qui s'en font	Germaine Dulac		France	Visualization of music
The Fall of the House of Usher	Jean Epstein	Jean Debucourt, Marguerite Gance	France	Horror, highly stylized
Disque 957	Germaine Dulac		France	Visualization of music
The Eleventh Year	Dziga Vertov		Soviet Union	
L'Étoile de mer	Man Ray	Alice Prin	France	Surrealist film financed by Charles De Noailles; written by Robert Desnos
Ghosts Before Breakfast	Hans Richter		Weimar Republic	Dadaist fantasy
Grotesken im Schnee	Alex Strasser, Lotte Reiniger		Weimar Republic	Animated "grotesque" with sillouhettes
Hände	Stella Simon, Miklós Bandy		Weimar Republic	Stylized love story utilizing only hands; made in silent and sound versions
Inflation	Hans Richter		Weimar Republic	Montage made for the feature Der Dame mit der Maske (1928). Visual abstraction on the subject of runaway inflation in Weimar-era Germany.
Impatience	Charles Dekeukeleire	Yvonne Selma	Belgium	Photographic abstract film
In the Shadow of the Machine	Albrecht Viktor Blum, Leo Lania		Weimar Republic	Montage made of footage shot by Dziga Vertov for A Sixth Part of the World
Johann the Coffin Maker	Robert Florey		United States	Horror short, Lost film
Jûjiro	Teinosuke Kinugasa	Akiko Chihaya, Junosuke Bando	Japan	Expressionistic treatment of Samurai story
The Last Moment	Paul Fejos	Otto Matieson, Lucille La Verne	United States	Independently-made, experimental feature; Lost film
The Life and Death of 9413: a Hollywood Extra	Robert Florey, Slavko Vorkapich	Jules Raucourt, George Voya	United States	Ultra low budget anti-Hollywood film
The Love of Zero	Robert Florey	Anielka Elter, Captain Marco Elter	United States	
Les nuits électriques	Eugène Deslaw		France	Semi-abstract art film of neon signs
October, a.k.a. Ten Days That Shook the World	Sergei Eisenstein	Nikolay Popov, Vasily Nikandrov	Soviet Union	Contains Eisenstein's most radical uses of montage
Le petite marchande d'alumettes	Jean Renoir, Jean Tedesco	Catherine Hessling, Eric Barclay	France	Fantasy short with surrealist elements
Praha v záři světel (Prague Shining in Lights)	Svatopluk Innemann		Czechoslovakia	City film
Rennsymphonie	Hans Richter		Weimar Republic	
The Seashell and the Clergyman	Germaine Dulac	Alex Allin, Genica Athanasiou	France	Surrealist dream film written by Antonin Artaud. Often dated to 1927, but premiered in Paris, 9 February 1928.
The Tell-Tale Heart	Charles Klein	Charles Darvas, Hans Fuerberg	United States	Horror short
Thèmes et Variations	Germaine Dulac		France	Visualization of music
There It Is	Charles Bowers	Charles Bowers, Kathryn McGuire	United States	Two reel comedy, absurd in the extreme
Twenty-Four Dollar Island	Robert J. Flaherty		United States	City film, variously dated to 1926, 1927. Premiered in NYC, 1 January 1928
Überfall	Ernő Metzner		Weimar Republic	
The Fall of the House of Usher	James Sibley Watson, Melville Webber		United States	Short film
Koko's Earth Control	Dave Fleischer, Max Fleischer	Koko the Clown	United States	Animated cartoon with exceptional visual dynamism; flash frames
Zvenigora	Oleksandr Dovzhenko	Mikola Nademsky, Semen Svashenko, Alexander Podorozhny	Soviet Union	Film poem with fantasy elements
1929
Alles dreht sich, alles bewegt sich (Everything Turns, Everything Revolves)	Hans Richter		Weimar Republic	Sound; music by Walter Gronostay. Only roughly half of this 15-minute experimental short still survives.
Arsenal	Oleksandr Dovzhenko	Amvrosy Buchma, Georgiy Kharkiv, Semyon Svashenko	Soviet Union	
The Bridge	Charles Vidor	Nicholas Bela, Charles Darvas	United States	Experimental narrative film based on Ambrose Bierce story, also known as The Spy; sometimes dated 1930-31
Brumes d'automne	Dimitri Kirsanoff	Nadia Sibirskaïa	France	Film poem, with synchronized music track
Dr Turner's Mental Home	Dora Carrington, Beakus Penrose		United Kingdom	Short, experimental melodrama. Not publicly screened.
Drifters	John Grierson		United Kingdom	Documentary with a distinctly modernist orientation
Étude cinégraphique sur une arabesque	Germaine Dulac		France	Visualization of music
Every Day	Hans Richter	Sergei Eisenstein, Basil Wright	United Kingdom	Artful semi-documentary about everyday life
H2O	Ralph Steiner		United States	
Histoire de détective	Charles Dekeukeleire	Pierre Bourgeois	Belgium	Semi-abstract film; despite the title, not a detective story
Images d'Ostende	Henri Storck		Belgium	
Impressionen vom alten Marseiller Hafen (Vieux Port)	László Moholy-Nagy		Weimar Republic	City film
Lullaby	Boris Deutsch	Riva Deutsch, Michael Visaroff	United States	Expressionist drama, likely incomplete; Horak dates it to 1925
Man with a Movie Camera	Dziga Vertov		Soviet Union	
Monkey's Moon	Kenneth MacPherson			
Montparnasse	Eugène Deslaw	Luis Buñuel, Filippo Marinetti	France	City film, with synchronized sound
My Grandmother	Kote Mikaberidze	Aleksandr Takaishvili, Bella Chernova	Georgia	Eccentric combination of avant-garde and social comedy
Les Mystères du Château de Dé	Man Ray	Man Ray, Georges Auric	France	Surrealist short funded by Charles De Noailles
The New Babylon	Grigori Kozintsev, Leonid Trauberg	David Gutman, Yelena Kuzmina	Soviet Union	Production of the Factory of the Eccentric Actor
La Perle	Henri D'Ursel	Georges Hugnet, Kissa Kouprine, Renee Savoye, Mary Stutz	Belgium	Experimental narrative film.
Pour vos beaux yeux	Henri Storck		Belgium	
Rain	Joris Ivens, Mannus Franken		Netherlands	
Skyscraper Symphony	Robert Florey		United States	City film
The Storming of La Sarraz	Hans Richter, Sergei Eisenstein, Ivor Montagu	Béla Balász, Léon Moussinac	Weimar Republic	Made during a film conference; Lost film
Studie Nr. 1	Oskar Fischinger		Weimar Republic	Abstract animation.
Tusalava	Len Lye		New Zealand	Abstract animation
Un Chien Andalou	Luis Buñuel	Pierre Batcheff, Simone Mareuil	France	Short surrealist film written by Buñuel and Salvador Dalí
War Under the Sea	M.G. MacPherson, Jean Michelson		United States	Artkino production; Lost film

== See also ==
- Cinéma pur
