= List of avant-garde films of the 1940s =

A list of avant-garde and experimental films released in the 1940s.

Title	Director	Cast	Nation	Notes
1941
Moods of the Sea	Slavko Vorkapić, John Hoffman		United States	Black & white, sound (Felix Mendelssohn: The Hebrides (overture)
Who Has Been Rocking My Dream Boat	Kenneth Anger		United States	Lost film.
1942
By Night with Torch and Spear	Joseph Cornell		United States	
Lambeth Walk - Nazi Style	Charles A. Ridley		United Kingdom	British propaganda short, which "remixes" marching Nazis to a pop song.
Tinsel Tree	Kenneth Anger		United States	Lost film
Variations on a Circle	James Whitney (filmmaker)		United States	Color, silent. Abstract animation, shot in 8mm.
1943
Allegretto	Oskar Fischinger		United States	Abstract animation, color, sound. Third version, completed in 1943
The Geography of the Body	Willard Maas	Willard Maas, Marie Menken	United States	Film poem, text written and read by George Barker (poet)
Meshes of the Afternoon	Maya Deren, Alexander Hammid	Maya Deren, Alexander Hammid	United States	Black & white; sound by composer Teiji Ito added in 1959. Established the movement known as "New American Cinema."
The Witch's Cradle	Maya Deren, Marcel Duchamp	Marcel Duchamp, Pajarito Matta	United States	Black & white; silent. Never finished; survives as workprint or gathering of trims.
1944
At Land	Maya Deren	Maya Deren, Alexander Hammid, Parker Tyler, John Cage	United States	
1945
The Eye and the Ear	Stefan Themerson, Franciszka Themerson		United Kingdom	
Le Vampire	Jean Painlevé		France	
Out-Takes From a Study in Choreography for Camera	Maya Deren	Talley Beatty	United States	
A Study in Choreography for Camera	Maya Deren	Talley Beatty	United States	
Visual Variations on Noguchi	Marie Menken		United States	
1946
The Potted Psalm	Sidney Peterson, James Broughton	Beatrix Perry, Harry Honig	United States	Live action surrealist short.
Ritual in Transfigured Time	Maya Deren	Maya Deren, Rita Christiani, Frank Westbrook, Anaïs Nin	United States	
1947
The Cage	Sidney Peterson		United States	
Dreams That Money Can Buy	Hans Richter	Max Ernst	United States	
Fireworks	Kenneth Anger	Kenneth Anger, Bill Seltzer, Gordon Gray	United States	
Forest Murmurs	Slavko Vorkapić, John Hoffman		United States	Black & white, sound; made for MGM, but withheld from release. Jacobs dates it to 1941; most other sources give 1947.
Lady in the Lake	Robert Montgomery	Robert Montgomery, Audrey Totter	United States	
Motion Painting No. 1	Oskar Fischinger		United States	
Private Life of a Cat	Maya Deren, Alexander Hammid		United States	
Le Tempestaire	Jean Epstein		France	
Transmutation	Jordan Belson		United States	Belson's first film, shown at Art in Cinema screenings in San Francisco in the early '50s; lost film.
1948
Du sang, de la volupté et de la mort	Gregory Markopoulos		United States	Color, 70 min. Begun in Los Angeles in 1947; finished in Toledo, Ohio. In three parts: Psyche, Lysis & Charmides.
In the Street	Helen Levitt, Janice Loeb, James Agee		United States	Silent; sound version issued in 1952
Meditation on Violence	Maya Deren	Chao Li Chi	United States	
The Petrified Dog	Sidney Peterson	Gail Randall, Marie Hirsh, Jo Landor	United States	
Weegee's New York	Weegee		United States	
1949
Christmas, U.S.A.	Gregory Markopoulos		United States	
The Lead Shoes	Sidney Peterson		United States	
Medusa	Maya Deren		United States	
Pacific 231	Jean Mitry		France	
Puce Moment	Kenneth Anger		United States	
