= Gina Manès =

French actress (1893–1989)

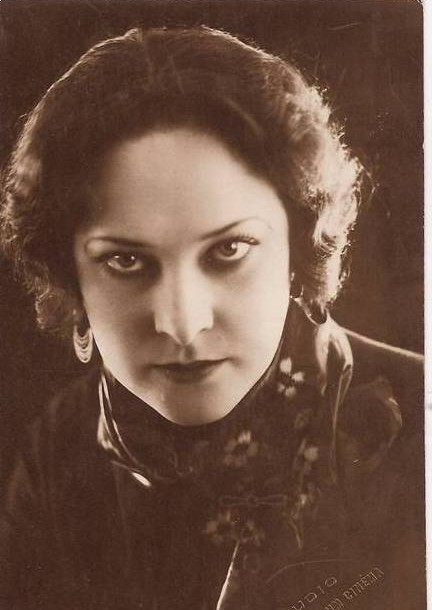
- Gina Manés
- Born: Blanche Moulin; 7 April 1893; Paris, French Third Republic
- Died: 6 September 1989 (aged 96); Toulouse, Haute-Garonne, Midi-Pyrénées, France
- Occupation: Actress
- Years active: 1916–1966

Gina Manès (born Blanche Moulin; 7 April 1893 – 6 September 1989) was a French film actress and a major star of French silent cinema. After an early appearance in a Louis Feuillade film, she had significant roles in films of Germaine Dulac and Jean Epstein, including Cœur fidèle.

== Career ==
Gina Manés

In Abel Gance's Napoléon, she took the part of Joséphine de Beauharnais, and then played the title role in Jacques Feyder's Thérèse Raquin. She made the transition to sound films but during the 1930s her popularity faded, and periods of residence in Morocco took her further from the public eye. She continued to take small roles in films, and also worked in the circus and in the theatre. In total, Manès appeared in over 90 films between 1916 and 1966.

== Selected filmography ==
- L'Homme sans visage (1919), directed by Louis Feuillade
- The Red Inn (L'Auberge rouge) (1923), directed by Jean Epstein
- Cœur fidèle (1923), directed by Jean Epstein
- Heart of an Actress (Âme d'artiste) (1924), directed by Germaine Dulac
- Sables (1927), directed by Dimitri Kirsanoff
- Napoléon (1927), directed by Abel Gance
- Sin (Synd) (1928), directed by Gustaf Molander
- The Saint and Her Fool (Die Heilige und ihr Narr) (1928), directed by William Dieterle
- Thérèse Raquin (1928), directed by Jacques Feyder
- Looping the Loop (Die Todesschleife) (1928), directed by Arthur Robison
- The Little Slave (Die kleine Sklavin) (1928), directed by Jacob Fleck and Luise Fleck
- Ship in Distress (S.O.S. Schiff in Not) (1929), directed by Carmine Gallone
- Latin Quarter (Quartier Latin) (1929), directed by Augusto Genina
- Le Train sans yeux (1929), directed by Alberto Cavalcanti
- Nights of Princes (Nuits de princes) (1930), directed by Marcel L'Herbier
- The Shark (Le Requin) (1930), directed by Henri Chomette
- Salto Mortale (1931), directed by Ewald André Dupont
- Under the Leather Helmet (Sous le casque de cuir) (1932), directed by Albert de Courville
- A Man's Neck (La Tête d'un homme) (1933), directed by Julien Duvivier
- La Voie sans disque (1933), directed by Léon Poirier
- The Pont-Biquet Family (La Famille Pont-Biquet) (1935), directed by Christian-Jaque
- Divine (1935), directed by Max Ophüls
- The Devil in the Bottle (Le Diable en bouteille) (1935), directed by Raoul Ploquin
- The Mysterious Lady (La Mystérieuse Lady) (1936), directed by Robert Péguy
- Mayerling (1936), directed by Anatole Litvak
- Wolves Between Them (Les Loups entre eux) (1936), directed by Léon Mathot
- Maria of the Night (Maria de la nuit) (1936), directed by Willy Rozier
- The Forsaken (Les Réprouvés) (1937), directed by Jacques Séverac
- Temptation (La Tentation) (1936), directed by Pierre Caron
- Mollenard (1938), directed by Robert Siodmak
- Sirocco (1938), directed by Pierre Chenal
- Fort Dolorès (1938), directed by René Le Hénaff
- Véréna's Wedding (1938), directed by Jacques Daroy
- The Postmaster's Daughter (Nostalgie) (1938), directed by Viktor Tourjansky
- Coral Reefs (Le Récif de corail) (1939), directed by Maurice Gleize
- Majestic Hotel Cellars (Les Caves du Majestic) (1945), directed by Richard Pottier
- The Dancer of Marrakesh (La Danseuse de Marrakech) (1949), directed by Léon Mathot
- The Count of Bragelonne (Le Vicomte de Bragelonne) (1954), directed by Fernando Cerchio
- Women Without Hope (Marchandes d'illusions) (1954), directed by Raoul André
- Crime at the Concert Mayol (Crime au Concert Mayol) (1954), directed by Pierre Méré
- Paris, Palace Hotel (1956), directed by Henri Verneuil
- Pity for the Vamps (Pitié pour les vamps) (1956), directed by Jean Josipovici
- A Certain Monsieur Jo (Un certain monsieur Jo) (1958), directed by René Jolivet
- First of May (Premier mai) (1958), directed by Luis Saslavsky
- Mimi Pinson (1958), directed by Robert Darène
