= List of avant-garde films =

This is chronological list of avant-garde and experimental films split by decade. Often there may be considerable overlap particularly between avant-garde/experimental and other genres (including, documentaries, fantasy, and science fiction films); the list should attempt to document films which are more closely related to the avant-garde, even if it bends genres.

== List by decade ==
- List of avant-garde films before 1930
- List of avant-garde films of the 1930s
- List of avant-garde films of the 1940s
- List of avant-garde films of the 1950s
- List of avant-garde films of the 1960s
- List of avant-garde films of the 1970s
- List of avant-garde films of the 1980s
- List of avant-garde films of the 1990s
- List of avant-garde films of the 2000s
- List of avant-garde films of the 2010s
- List of avant-garde films of the 2020s
