= French impressionist cinema =

1920s French film movement

The Fall of the House of Usher (1928), directed by Jean Epstein

French impressionist cinema (also known as first avant-garde or narrative avant-garde) refers to a group of French films and filmmakers of the 1920s.

Film scholars have had much difficulty in defining this movement or for that matter deciding whether it should be considered a movement at all. David Bordwell has attempted to define a unified stylistic paradigm and set of tenets. Others, namely Richard Abel, criticize these attempts and group the films and filmmakers more loosely, based on a common goal of "exploration of the process of representation and signification in narrative film discourse." Still others such as Dudley Andrew would struggle with awarding any credibility at all as "movement".

== Filmmakers and films (selection) ==
- Abel Gance (La Dixième symphonie, 1918, J’Accuse, 1919, La Roue, 1922, and, above all, Napoléon, 1927)
- Jean Epstein (Coeur fidèle, 1923, Six and One Half Times Eleven, 1927, The Three-Sided Mirror, 1928, and The Fall of the House of Usher, 1928)
- Germaine Dulac (The Smiling Madame Beudet, 1923)
- Marcel L'Herbier (El Dorado, 1921)
- Louis Delluc – (La Femme de nulle part, 1922)
- Jean Renoir (Nana, 1926)
- Dimitri Kirsanoff ( Brumes D'Autumne, 1929, Ménilmontant, 1926)

== Periodization ==
1. Pictorialism (beginning in 1918): made up of films that focus mainly on manipulation of the film as image, through camerawork, mise-en-scene, and optical devices.
2. Montage (beginning in 1923): at which point rhythmic and fast-paced editing became more widely used.
3. Diffusion (beginning in 1926): at which point films and filmmakers began to pursue other stylistic and formal modes.

== Stylistic paradigm ==
Based on David Bordwell's family resemblance model:

1. Camerawork
  1. Camera distance: close-up (as synecdoche, symbol or subjective image)
  2. Camera angle (high or low)
  3. Camera movement (independent of subject, for graphic effects, point of view)
2. Mise-en-scene
  1. Lighting (single source, shadows indicating off-screen actions, variety of lighting situations)
  2. Décor
  3. Arrangement and movement of figures in space
3. Optical devices
  1. As transitions
  2. As magical effects
  3. As emphasizing significant details
  4. As pictorial decoration
  5. As conveyors of abstract meanings
  6. As indications of objectivity (mental images, semi-subjective images, optical subjectivity)
4. Characteristic editing patterns
  1. Temporal relations between shots (Flashback or fantasy)
  2. Spatial relation between shots (synthetic, glance/object, crosscutting)
  3. Rhythmic relations between shots

== Relation to and deviation from Hollywood stylistics ==
However, even Marcel L’Herbier, one of the chief filmmakers associated with the movement, admitted to an ununified theoretical stance: "None of us – Dulac, Epstein, Delluc or myself – had the same aesthetic outlook. But we had a common interest, which was the investigation of that famous cinematic specificity. On this we agreed completely."

Richard Abel's re-evaluation of Bordwell's analysis sees the films as a reaction to conventional stylistic and formal paradigms, rather than Bordwell's resemblance model. Thus Abel refers to the movement as the Narrative Avant-Garde. He views the films as a reaction to narrative paradigm found in commercial filmmaking, namely that of Hollywood, and is based on literary and generic referentiality, narration through intertitles, syntactical continuity, a rhetoric based on verbal language and literature, and a linear narrative structure, then subverts it, varies it, deviates from it.

== Criticism ==
The movement is also often credited with the origins of film criticism and Louis Delluc is often cited as the first film critic. The movement published journals and periodicals reviewing recent films and discussing trends and ideas about cinema.

Cine-clubs were also formed by filmmakers and enthusiasts, which screened hand picked films: select American fare, German and Swedish films, but most often films made by the members of the clubs themselves.

== Theory ==
The narrative avant-garde did have a theoretical base, although its divergent articulation by different writer-filmmakers has confused the issue to a certain extent. Much of it is an extension of Symbolist poetics that posit a realm beyond matter and our immediate sense experience that art and the artist attempt to reveal and express. Bordwell goes on to point out the massive holes in this theorization, that the true nature of reality and experience are never established. Holes aside, the narrative avant-garde explores the perception of the reality, and does so through two main concepts: subjectivity and photogénie. Neither of these terms is easily explainable, if at all, but that is part of the point — for these filmmakers explored an unattainable understanding that can only be reached for. French impressionism destabilized familiar or objective ways of seeing, creating new dynamics of human perception. Using strange and imaginative effects, it altered traditional views and aimed to question the norm of the film industry at the time.

=== Subjectivity ===
Through the properties noted above in Bordwell's stylistic paradigm, filmmakers sought to portray the internal state of the character or characters and in some of the later and more complex films attempt to bring the audience into the equation as subjective participant.

=== Photogénie ===
Photogénie occurs at the meeting of the profilmic (what is in front of the camera) and the mechanical and the filmmaker. It is above all a defamiliarization of the spectator with what appears on screen. It is a property that cannot be found in "reality" itself, a camera that is simply switched on does not record it, and a filmmaker cannot simply point it out. As Aitken summarizes, "…fully realized photogénie could only be manifested when its latent power was employed to express the vision of the film-maker, so that the inherent poetry of the cinema could be harnessed, and developed in a revelatory manner by the auteur". However, the narrative avant-garde lacked a theoretical and philosophical base upon which these notions rest and thus the concept of photogénie is always on the edge of an inexplicable mysticism that many critics cannot accept.
