= La Fête espagnole =

1920 film

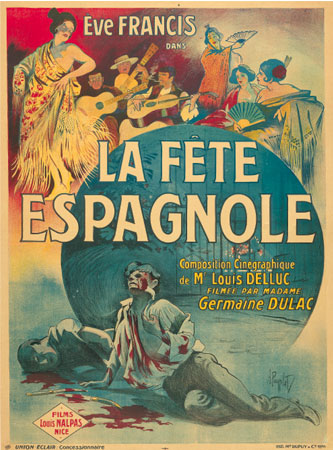
- Directed by: Germaine Dulac
- Written by: Louis Delluc
- Produced by: Serge Sandberg, Louis Nalpas
- Starring: Ève Francis
- Cinematography: Paul Parguel, Georges Raulet
- Distributed by: Union-Eclair
- Release date: 1920
- Running time: 67 minutes
- Country: France
- Language: Silent film

La Fête espagnole (lit. The Spanish celebration) is a 1920 French silent film directed by Germaine Dulac and written by Louis Delluc. It was cited by critic and film historian Georges Sadoul as being first in ushering in French impressionist cinema.

== Plot ==
During a festival day in a small Spanish town, lifelong friends Miguélan and Réal return to visit with their shared object of affection, the dancer Soledad. Faintly amused, she cares for neither one of them, but proposes that they should fight to the death for her hand. As the two friends struggle, Soledad pursues Juanito, a young man caught up in the drunken whirl and excitement of the festival.

== Cast ==
- Ève Francis ... Soledad
- Jean Toulout ... Miguélan
- Gaston Modot ... Réal
- Robert Delsol ... Juanito
- Anna Gay ... la vieille Paguien
- Gabriel Gabrio

== Production ==
Ève Francis had already starred in Germaine Dulac's earlier serial Âmes des fous (1918). In either late 1918 or early 1919, Francis asked if she could bring by her fiancee, Louis Delluc. At their first meeting, Delluc—who was already a respected, up-and-coming film critic for Paris-Midi—read his scenario "Le Fandango," reputedly written on the cut-out section of a paper tablecloth. Dulac was impressed and agreed to direct the production, which commenced in late August 1919 at the site of the future Victorine Studios in Nice; Louis Nalpas agreed to back the production as long as it was shot there, though some additional material was filmed in the Basque border town of Hondarribia. For the duration of the shooting, which concluded in November, Delluc was only seen intermittently on the set. He was, however, fully involved in editing the film with Dulac. It was screened for critics on 17 March 1920, and went into release either 31 March or 7 May 1920.

== Reception ==
La Fête espagnole was praised as something vital and new in French cinema, although—as observed by Tami Williams—the praise was directed toward Delluc, and not Dulac. For Delluc's part, he never avoided praising Dulac's contribution to the success of the film, stating that it was "a rare example of complete cooperation in French cinema. Author, director and actors have agreed, through their specific affinities and willingness to work, to seek the absolute realization of the chosen theme." Ève Francis commented that La Fête espagnole "had a staggering effect on the filmmakers then. The accelerated movement of this synthetic drama, suffused with poetry, was an unprecedented novelty." Delluc's original screenplay consisted of 217 numbered scenes, with each scene indicated by single line of text, and a gradual acceleration in the pace of these shots is observed as the film progresses. Henri Langlois commented that La Fête espagnole was "the key film of French film history: as important as Eisenstein's Strike." Despite its influence on other filmmakers and favorable critical appraisal, the moviegoing public ignored the film, and it was banned in Portugal.

Delluc's screenplay was one of three published under the title Drames du Cinema in 1923.

== Preservation status ==
Excerpts preserved from La Fête espagnole

Only 8 minutes of La Fête espagnole, which originally ran 67 minutes, have survived. According to Williams, this consists of three or four short and disconnected sequences from throughout the film. These nitrate negative fragments were acquired by Henri Langlois in 1938 from Éclair, and were transferred to safety film in 1948; nothing else of La Fête espagnole has turned up since then. Nevertheless, this film remnant is still shown periodically in retrospectives of Dulac's work and was included, in 2012, in the Cinémathèque Française's festival Toute la mémoire du monde.

== Alternative titles ==
- Spanish Fiesta
- Spanish Festival
