= Edmond Van Daële =

Dutch-French film actor

- Born: Edmond Jean Adolphe Minckwitz; 11 August 1884; Paris, France
- Died: 11 March 1960 (aged 75); Grez-Neuville, Maine-et-Loire, France
- Occupation: Actor
- Years active: 1915–1960

Edmond Van Daële (11 August 1884, in Paris – 11 March 1960, in Grez-Neuville, Maine-et-Loire, France) was a Dutch-French film actor.

Born as Edmond Jean Adolphe Minckwitz, he appeared in the 1923 silent film Coeur fidèle, directed by Jean Epstein. He starred in nearly 50 films including Abel Gance's Napoleon between 1915 and 1950.

== Selected filmography ==
- Six and One Half Times Eleven (1927)
- Sables (1927)
- Napoléon (1927)
- Madame Récamier (1928)
- Cagliostro (1929)
- The Mystery of the Yellow Room (1930)
- The Shark (1930)
- The Perfume of the Lady in Black (1931)
- Dance Hall (1931)
- The Three Musketeers (1932)
- The Tunnel (1933)
- Maria Chapdelaine (1934)
- Moscow Nights (1934)
- The Phantom Gondola (1936)
- The Emigrant (1940)
- Goodbye Leonard (1943)
- Sending of Flowers (1950)
