= Marie-Anne Colson-Malleville =

French film director

- Born: Marie Anne Françoise Mareau; 8 February 1892; Sainte-Gemmes-sur-Loire
- Died: 11 March 1971; Paris
- Other names: M. A. Colson-Malleville, M. A. Malleville
- Occupation: Film director
- Partner: Germaine Dulac
- Relatives: Pierre Filmon (grand-nephew)

Marie-Anne Colson-Malleville (8 February 1892 – 11 March 1971), born Marie Anne Françoise Mareau, was a French film director, best known for her short documentary films about Algeria. She was the partner of director Germaine Dulac from the 1920s until Dulac's death in 1942.

== Early life ==
Marie Anne Françoise Mareau was born in Sainte-Gemmes-sur-Loire in 1892.

== Career ==
Colson-Malleville worked as a teacher and as a film programmer as a young woman. She was assistant director on five silent films directed by her partner Germaine Dulac in the 1920s: Gossette (1923), Celles qui s'en font (1923), Heart of an Actress (1924), The Devil in the City (1925), and L'Invitation au voyage (1930). After Dulac's death, Colson-Malleville returned to filmwork, and directed documentaries including Doigts de lumière (1949), Baba Ali (1952), Des rails sous les palmiers (1952), Tapisseries de l'apocalypse (1956), A la sueur de ton front (1957), and Pierre de Lune (1960). Many of her short documentary films were made in and about French Algeria. Colson-Malleville also wrote songs, and organized gatherings on film history.

Colson-Malleville preserved Germaine Dulac's papers and correspondence, which were eventually archived as Fonds Marie-Anne Colson-Malleville at the Bibliothèque du Film in Paris, and lectures on film, which were recently published as What is Cinema? (2019).

== Personal life ==
Colson-Malleville and Germaine Dulac were partners in both professional and private lives, from the early 1920s until Dulac's death in 1942. She was married twice during her time with Dulac, to Paul Malleville and to George Colson; both men were in the French film industry who were friends with Dulac. Colson-Malleville died in 1971, aged 79 years, in Paris. French filmmaker Pierre Filmon is Colson-Malleville's grand nephew, her brother's grandson.
