= Sea of Dreams =

Sea of Dreams may refer to:

== Music ==
=== Albums ===
- Sea of Dreams (1958 album), a 1958 album by Nelson Riddle
- The Private Sea of Dreams, a 1967 album by Ennio Morricone
- Sea of Dreams (1995 album), a 1995 album by Godgory
- The Sea of Dreams (1998 album), a 1998 album by Davy Spillane, featuring Sinéad O'Connor

=== Songs ===
- "Sea of Dreams" (Misia song), a 2006 single by Misia
- "Sea of Dreams", a song from the 1969 album Idle Race
- "Sea of Dreams", a song by Captain Hollywood Project from the 1995 album Animals or Human
- "Sea of Dreams", a song by Orphanage from the 1997 EP At the Mountains of Madness
- "Everything I Need (Sea Of Dreams)", a 2008 single by Jan Johnston
- "Sea of Dreams", a song by Battle Beast from the 2015 album Unholy Savior
- "Sea of Dreams", a song by Oberhofer on the 2017 soundtrack album for BoJack Horseman

== Other uses ==
- Mare Desiderii, an area on the far side of the Moon
- Sea of Dreams, a 1930 U.S. film by Warren Newcombe, see List of avant-garde films before 1930
- Sea of Dreams (novella), a 2002 science fiction novella by Liu Cixin

== See also ==
- The Dreaming Sea, a 1996 album by Karen Matheson
