= Moods of the Sea =

Film by Slavko Vorkapić

- Title card
- Directed by: Slavko Vorkapich; John Hoffman
- Music by: Felix Mendelssohn
- Release date: 1979
- Running time: 10 minutes

Moods of the Sea (1941) is a non-narrative experimental film by Slavko Vorkapich and John Hoffman, set to the music of Felix Mendelssohn known as the Hebrides (Fingal's Cave) Overture.

The film is considered to be an early example of American avant-garde and experimental film. It is currently held in the Vorkapich – Hoffman Collection at the USC School of Cinematic Arts.

== Synopsis ==
Moods of the Sea contains no dialogue and features footage of the sea and surrounding wildlife. Examples of the "moods" of the sea include waves crashing against a rocky cliff and calmly lapping at a beach and rocks.

== Production ==
The short film was created around 1941; some sources list the creation date as around 1940-1942. Vorkapich's title card for the short states that it was copyrighted in 1942.

== Release and restoration ==
Vorkapich was unable to release Moods of the Sea upon completing it alongside Hoffman, due to a lack of funding and studio interest. The short was released in 1979 and has since received critical attention from film critics and academics. Moods of the Sea was later restored by film preservation expert David Shepard and the UCLA Film & Television Archive in 2004, utilizing grant funding from the National Film Preservation Foundation. It was then included in the 7-disc DVD collection Unseen Cinema: Early American Avant Garde Film 1894-1941, released in October 2005.

Moods of the Sea has screened at multiple film festivals that included the UCLA Festival of Preservation, Musée de l'Orangerie, and the 2013 Jihlava International Documentary Film Festival.

== Reception ==
The film is considered to be an early example of American avant-garde and experimental film by critics such as Jan-Christopher Horak. Horak has stated that "True to Vorkapich’s interest in montage, the images from the constantly moving camera are cut precisely to the music, and each sequence reaches a rhythmic crescendo with the melody, emphasizing the subjective nature of the camera’s point of view." The Chicago Reader noted that the film was an example of films that "register quite differently than their makers intended: Slavko Vorkapich and John Hoffman's impressionistic, somewhat pompous Moods of the Sea (1942) tries to marry ocean imagery with the Mendelssohn on its sound track (crashing waves for loud sections, birds for calm ones), and while it's hard to take as seriously as it seems to demand, it fascinates by pushing the visualization of music to such an extreme."

Charles Silver, the curator for the Museum of Modern Art's department of film, compared Moods of the Sea to others shown by the museum, specifically Jean Epstein’s Le Tempestaire and Arne Sucksdorff’s Trut! (The Sea Hawk).

== Legacy ==
Vorkapich's experimental films, including Moods of the Sea, were an influence on film student and future director George Lucas.
