= Suzy Pierson =

French actress (1902–1996)

- Born: Suzanne Marie Germaine Marchand; 11 October 1902; Paris, France
- Died: 2 October 1996 (aged 93); Antibes, France
- Occupation: Actress
- Years active: 1920–1949 (film)

Suzy Pierson (1902–1996) was a French film actress. She played lead roles in several silent films of the 1920s.

== Selected filmography ==
- Paris (1924)
- Six and One Half Times Eleven (1927)
- The Three-Sided Mirror (1927)
- André Cornélis (1927)
- Napoleon at Saint Helena (1929)
- 77 Rue Chalgrin (1931)
- Azaïs (1931)
- Let's Touch Wood (1933)
- The Devil in the Bottle (1935)
- The Club of Aristocrats (1937)
- The West (1938)
- Monsieur Breloque Has Disappeared (1938)
- Behold Beatrice (1944)

== Bibliography ==
- Goble, Alan. The Complete Index to Literary Sources in Film. Walter de Gruyter, 1999.
