= La Montagne infidèle =

1923 documentary film directed by Jean Epstein

- Directed by: Jean Epstein
- Cinematography: Paul Guichard
- Production company: Pathé Frères
- Release date: 1923
- Running time: 24 minutes
- Country: France

La Montagne infidèle (English: The Unfaithful Mountain) is a 1923 French silent film directed by Jean Epstein. It is a documentary film about the 1923 volcanic eruption of Mount Etna in Sicily.

== Synopsis ==
The film begins with images of the rural, fertile and tranquil Sicilian countryside. It then shows the devastation wrought by lava flows near the town of Linguaglossa: houses buried by lava, destruction of farmland and infrastructure, and the impact on local inhabitants.

The film culminates with shots of the volcano itself: lava rivers, the erupting craters, close-up views of molten flows, including a lava front reportedly 150 metres wide, according to intertitles.

Alongside the natural spectacle, the film occasionally captures human presence, including fleeing villagers and local reactions.

== Production ==
On 16 June 1923 in Sicily, two craters of Mount Etna erupted. Pathé Newsreels decided to send a team to film the event. Under exclusive contract since January, Jean Epstein was chosen to travel to Sicily with a small crew (Paul Guichard, cameraman, and Léon Donnot, assistant), camera equipment, and unexposed film. With great daring, they filmed the spectacular lava flow and the devastation it caused to the surrounding villages, and returned with a 500-metre documentary.

== Rediscovery ==
Thought to be a lost film, in 2021 a complete 28 mm Pathé Kok print from a private collection, tinted, with Spanish intertitles, was identified in the collections of Filmoteca de Catalunya (Pere Tresserra collection, Barcelona). The film was digitally restored in 4K in 2022.

The restored version was publicly screened for the first time in decades at the 2022 Pordenone Silent Film Festival and subsequently at other festivals such as Il Cinema Ritrovato. It was shown for the first time in France at the Cinémathèque française's Toute la mémoire du monde (All the Memory of the World) Festival in 2023
