= Private Smith of the U.S.A. =

1942 film

- Directed by: Slavko Vorkapić
- Cinematography: Harry W. Smith
- Production company: RKO Radio Pictures
- Release date: October 2, 1942
- Running time: 19 minutes
- Country: United States
- Language: English

Private Smith of the U.S.A. is a 1942 American short documentary film directed by Slavko Vorkapić. Produced by RKO Radio Pictures, it was nominated for an Academy Award at the 15th Academy Awards for Best Short Subject (Two-Reel). The film features Private William Terry of Pasadena, California, who later starred in Stage Door Canteen (1943).
