= The Lead Shoes =

1949 film by Sidney Peterson

The Lead Shoes is a 1949 experimental film directed by Sidney Peterson at Workshop 20 at the San Francisco Art Institute. The film was made using distorting lenses. The film is a 17-minute black and white short.

In 2009, the film was selected for preservation in the National Film Registry by the Library of Congress, being deemed “culturally, historically or aesthetically” significant. It appears on the DVD Avant-Garde Volume 3 (Experimental Cinema 1922-1954).
