= Dobrinci =

Dobrinci Добринци (Serbian)
- Village (Selo)
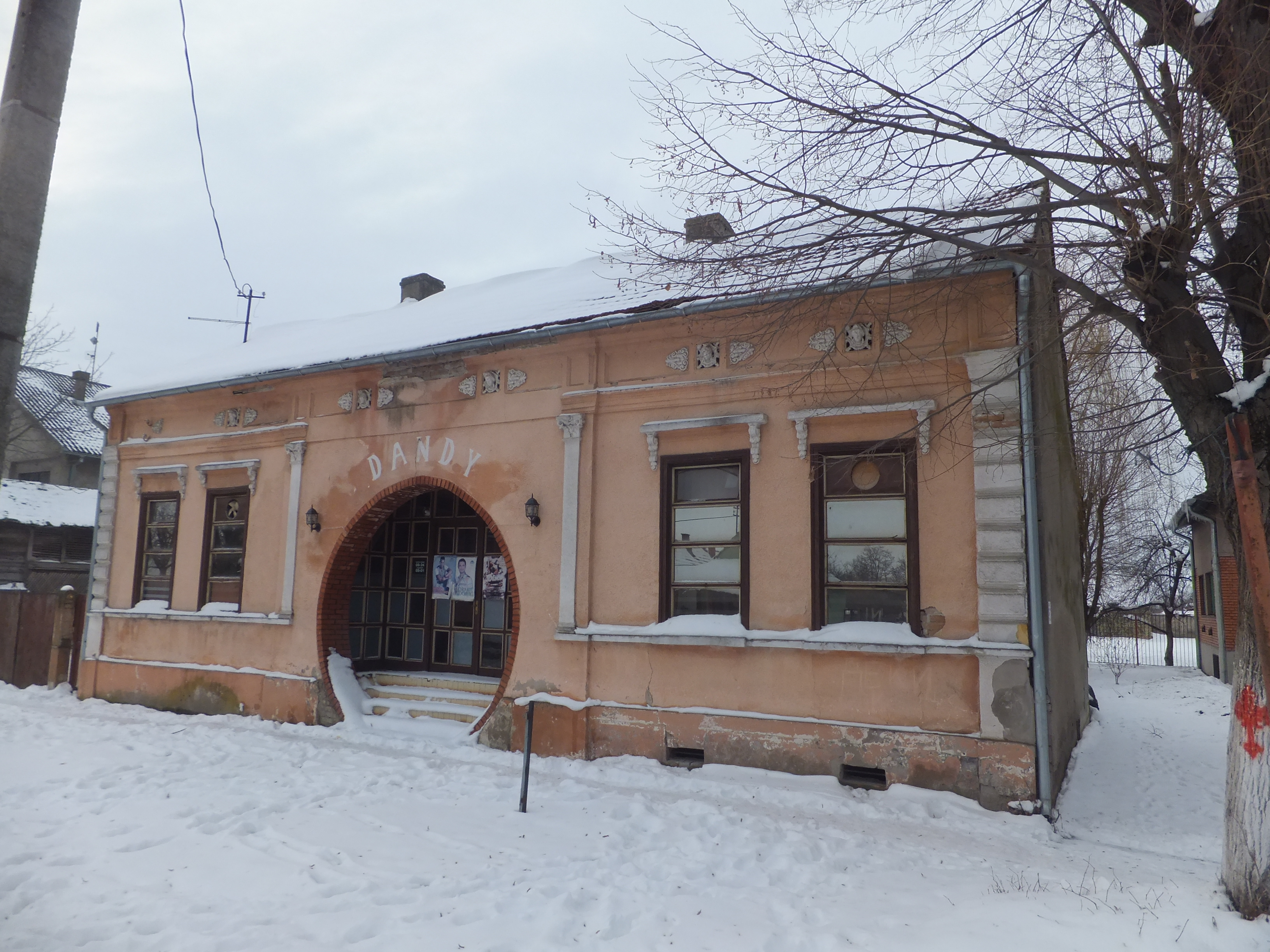

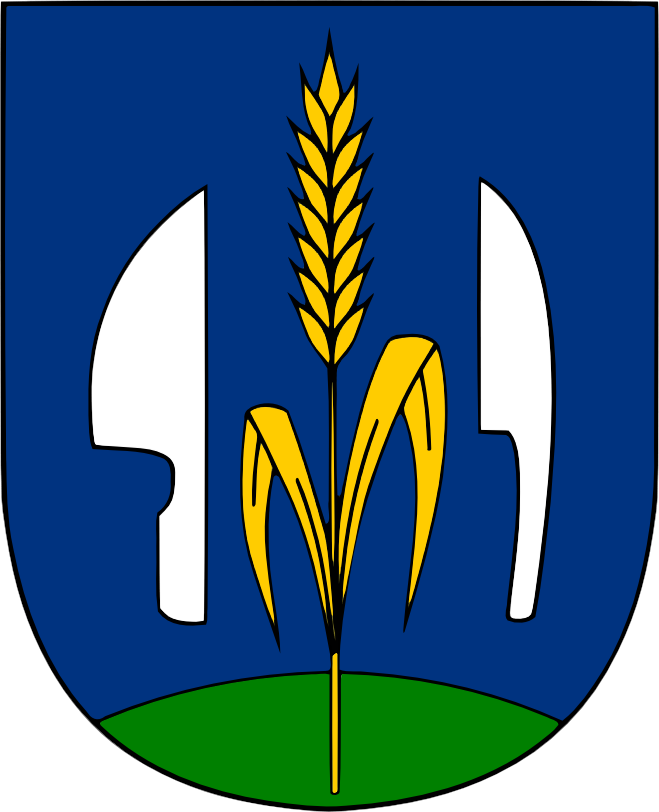
- Seal
- Interactive map of Dobrinci
- Location within Vojvodina Location within Serbia Location within Europe
- Coordinates: 44°57′N 19°56′E
- Country: Serbia
- Province: Vojvodina
- Region: Syrmia
- District: Srem
- Municipality: Ruma

Population (2011)
  - Total: 1,547
- Time zone: UTC+1 (CET)
  - Summer (DST): UTC+2 (CEST)

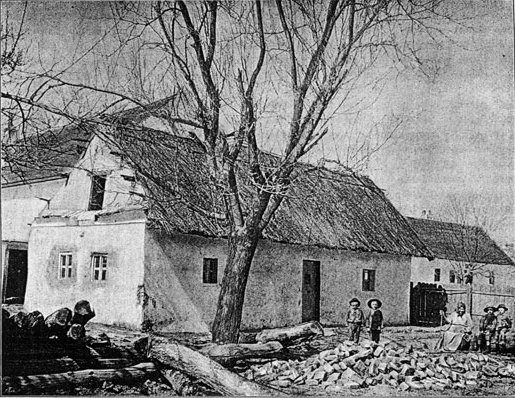
Birth house of Jovan Subotić in Dobrinci, 19th century.

Dobrinci (Serbian Cyrillic: Добринци) is a village in Serbia. It is situated in the Ruma municipality, in the Srem District, Vojvodina province. The village has a Serb ethnic majority and its population numbering 1,716 people (2002 census).

== Name ==
The name of the town in Serbian is plural.

== History ==
12th century fibulae with three birds were found in Dobrinci. The village was firstly mentioned in 1390. In that time it was part of the Syrmia County within the medieval Kingdom of Hungary. According to 1495 data, the village was mainly populated by Serbs. In 1521, the village became part of the Ottoman Empire. In 1527-1530, it was part of the vassal Ottoman duchy of Syrmia of Serb duke Radoslav Čelnik and was subsequently included into the Sanjak of Syrmia.

In 1718, the village became part of the Habsburg monarchy. It was placed under military administration and was part of the Habsburg Kingdom of Slavonia. Civil administration was introduced in 1745 and the village was included into the newly formed Syrmia County. This county was part of the Habsburg Kingdom of Slavonia, which in 1744 was administratively included into the Habsburg Kingdom of Croatia and the Habsburg Kingdom of Hungary. In 1848-1849, the village was part of autonomous Serbian Vojvodina, and in 1849-1860 part of Voivodeship of Serbia and Banat of Temeschwar, a separate Austrian land. After the abolishment of the voivodeship in 1860, the village was again incorporated into Syrmia County of the Kingdom of Slavonia, which was a separate Austrian land in this time. In 1868, Kingdom of Slavonia was joined with the Kingdom of Croatia into the Kingdom of Croatia-Slavonia, which was included into the Kingdom of Hungary within the Dual Monarchy of Austria-Hungary. The village was part of the Ruma district within the Syrmia County. In 1910, ethnic Serbs were in absolute majority in the village.

In 1918, the village firstly became part of the State of Slovenes, Croats and Serbs, then part of the Kingdom of Serbia and finally part of the Kingdom of Serbs, Croats and Slovenes (later known as Yugoslavia). From 1918 to 1922, the village was part of the Syrmia county, from 1922 to 1929 part of the Syrmia oblast, and from 1929 to 1941 part of the Danube Banovina. During World War II, from 1941 to 1944, the village was occupied by Axis troops and was included into the Pavelić's Independent State of Croatia. During the war, Yugoslav partisan resistance movement was active in the area and the village was part of the partisan liberated territory in Syrmia. After defeat of the Axis troops, in 1944, the village was included into Yugoslav Vojvodina, which (from 1945) was an autonomous province of new socialist Serbia within Yugoslavia.

== Ethnic groups (2002 census) ==
- Serbs = 1,634
- Romani = 44
- Yugoslavs = 9

== Historical population ==
- 1948: 1,680
- 1953: 1,625
- 1961: 1,629
- 1971: 1,641
- 1981: 1,696
- 1991: 1,701
- 2002: 1,716
- 2011: 1,547

== Economy ==
Dobrinci is well known for watermelon production.

== Notable villagers ==
Dobrinci is the birthplace of writer Jovan Subotić (1817–1886). It is also the birthplace of Slavko Vorkapić-Vorki (1894–1976), a famous film theoretic and professor. Famous Nađa Blagojević and Miroslav Djuric is born here.

== See also ==
- List of places in Serbia
- List of cities, towns and villages in Vojvodina
