= Le Tempestaire =

- Directed by: Jean Epstein
- Written by: Jean Epstein
- Produced by: Nino Constantini
- Cinematography: Albert Militon
- Music by: Yves Baudrier
- Production company: France Illustration
- Release date: 1947
- Running time: 23 minutes
- Country: France
- Language: French

Le Tempestaire is a 1947 French short drama film written and directed by Jean Epstein. The title translates as "The storm tamer". The story revolves around a woman who is worried for her fiancé, who is out at sea during a storm. The film makes use of temporal techniques such as time-lapse and slow motion both in images and sound.

== Plot ==
In a fishing village on the coast of Brittany, a young woman and her grandmother sit by a spinning wheel. The wind suddenly makes the front door open by itself and the woman says it is a bad omen. The woman is visited by her fiancé, who against her advice goes out to fish for sardines. The wind starts to harden and soon there is a full storm. The grandmother tells the woman that in old times, people believed in "storm masters", old men who could control the wind, but that such things are only superstition.

As the woman grows increasingly worried, she goes to the lighthouse and asks the keepers about an old man who might be a storm master. She visits the man who at first is reluctant but eventually brings out a crystal ball. Inside the ball, the stormy sea appears. When the man gently blows at the ball, the waves change speed, move in slow motion, and at one point play backwards. The man drops the ball to the floor and it breaks. The fiancé turns up and brings the woman home. The wind has calmed down.

== Production ==
A recurring motif in Jean Epstein's film theory had from the beginning been cinema's capacity to provide perceptions of time alternative to what can be experienced in daily life. Around the time of the production of Le Tempestaire, Epstein had begun to publish theories about sound in film. He was influenced by the musique concrète movement, and stressed that music and "the phonograph" were two separate artforms, the latter with the possibility to provide new dimensions to familiar, non-abstract sounds. Le Tempestaire was produced by France Illustration. It was shot at Belle Île and starred local fishermen and lighthouse keepers.

== Release ==
The film premiered in 1947. It was included on the 2005 DVD Avant-Garde: Experimental Cinema of the 1920s and 1930s from Kino International.

== See also ==
- 1947 in film
- Cinema of France
- Ethnofiction
- French Impressionist Cinema
- Weather modification
