= Six and One Half Times Eleven =

1927 film directed by Jean Epstein

- Directed by: Jean Epstein
- Screenplay by: Marie Epstein
- Produced by: Jean Epstein
- Starring: Edmond Van Daële; Nino Constantini; René Ferté; Suzy Pierson
- Cinematography: Georges Périnal
- Music by: Loris Bernot
- Production company: Les Films Jean Epstein
- Distributed by: C. U. C.
- Release date: 3 June 1927
- Running time: 83 minutes
- Country: France
- Language: French

Six and One Half Times Eleven (1927) by Jean Epstein

Six and One Half Times Eleven (French: Six et demi, onze; 6½ x 11), also known as 6½ x 11, is a 1927 French melodrama film directed by Jean Epstein, starring Edmond Van Daële, Suzy Pierson, Nino Constantini and René Ferté. It is about two brothers falling in love with the same woman. The original scenario of the film was written by Marie Epstein, the director's sister.

== Plot ==
Jerome and Jean de Ners are praying in front of the tomb of their parents. Jean is an idle young man passionately in love with a singer, Mary Winter. Jerome, a famous doctor, takes cares of him and worries about his outbursts.

One night, after receiving a phone call from Marie, the woman he loves, Jean suddenly disappears without warning his brother. He drives to the south of France to live with his great love in a luxury villa. He buys a photo camera and wants to take a photo of her but she first refuses. One evening, they meet Harry Gold, a famous dancer, and she enjoys dancing with him. The following day, she finally let Jean take a picture of her.

Jean is very happy, but the following morning, he finds she's gone away. The gardener says he has seen her leaving with Harry. Jean wants to go after them but he is delayed by a flat tyre. While Mary and Harry enjoy their love story while going on with their respective dancer and singer careers, Jean is desperate. Looking at the camera still containing Mary's unprocessed photo, he realises he will never see her again and shoots himself. At the same moment, his portrait hanging in Jérôme's house falls from the wall and he understands something terrible has happened to him.

One day Mary faints during one of her shows. Jerome, who was attending the performance gives her first aid. Discovering that she is Jean's brother, she tries successfully to seduce him. Jerome is informed that a trunk with Jean's belongings has been found in a villa on the French Riviera which is being transformed into a hotel. He travels by train to the south of France to recover it and Mary, breaking her dancing commitments follows him. They stay in the villa now turned into a hotel. Jerome finds the letter left by Jean where he explains that he killed himself for the love of a cruel woman. Mary still hopes that he will not discover that she is the cruel woman but Jerome then finds the camera with the film still in it.

When he processes the film and recognises her, she understand their love is impossible and runs away and faints on the beach. Jérôme brings her back to life and while she resumes her singing career, she seems to enjoy only charity Christmas parties and hospital parties.

The enigmatic title of the film refers to the size in centimetres of the photograph taken by Jean.

== Cast ==
Nino Constantini, Suzy Pierson and René Ferté

- Edmond Van Daële as Jérôme de Ners
- Nino Constantini as Jean de Ners
- René Ferté as Harry Gold
- Suzy Pierson as Marie Mortelle/Mary Winters

== Production and distribution ==
The film was shot during the autumn of 1926. It is the second film that Epstein directed for his own production company, Les Films Jean Epstein. It premiered on 3 June 1927 at the Studio des Ursulines in Paris. It was distributed in France by the Compagnie Universelle Cinématographique. It premiered in New York City on 12 August 1929.

== Restoration ==
The film was restored in 2013 by the Cinémathèque Française using the nitrate negative kept in its archives. The work was done at the Laboratoires Eclair.
