= John Hoffman (filmmaker) =

American editor of montage sequences and director (1904–1980)

John Hoffman (29 August 1904, in Hungary – 6 January 1980, in Altadena, California), was an American editor of montage sequences for several Hollywood studio features. He also directed a number of films, including The Wreck of the Hesperus and Strange Confession.

With his colleague, the Serbian montagist Slavko Vorkapich, Hoffman made two striking visual tone poems, Moods of the Sea (a.k.a. Fingal's Cave, 1941) and Forest Murmurs (1947). The former film is set to Felix Mendelssohn's Hebrides Overture and was restored in 2004 by film preservation expert David Shepard.

== Selected filmography ==
- The Crimson Canary (1945)
- The Fabulous Suzanne (1946)
- Storm Over Tibet (1952)
