= Heart of an Actress =

1924 film

- Directed by: Germaine Dulac
- Written by: Christian Molbech (novel); Alexandre Volkoff; Germaine Dulac
- Produced by: Gregor Rabinovitch
- Starring: Iván Petrovich; Nicolas Koline; Mabel Poulton
- Cinematography: Jules Kruger; Nikolai Toporkoff
- Production company: Ciné France
- Distributed by: Pathé Consortium Cinéma
- Release date: 7 October 1924
- Country: France
- Languages: Silent; French intertitles

Heart of an Actress (French: Âme d'artiste) is a 1924 French silent drama film directed by Germaine Dulac and starring Iván Petrovich, Nicolas Koline and Mabel Poulton. Poulton had almost been cast in Abel Gance's Napoleon, but after being turned down she appeared in this film before returning to Britain.

== Cast ==
- Iván Petrovich as Herbert Campbell, le poète
- Nicolas Koline as Le souffleur Morris, père adoptif d'Helen
- Mabel Poulton as Helen Taylor
- Yvette Andréyor as Mrs. Campbell, femme du poète
- Henry Houry as Lord Stamford
- Jeanne Bérangère as La belle-mère
- Félix Barre as Vendeur
- Gina Manès as L'Actrice
- Charles Vanel
- Lou Davy
- Ève Francis
- Gaston Modot

== Bibliography ==
- Macnab, Geoffrey. Searching for Stars. Cassell, 2000.
