= Cœur fidèle =

1923 silent film by Jean Epstein

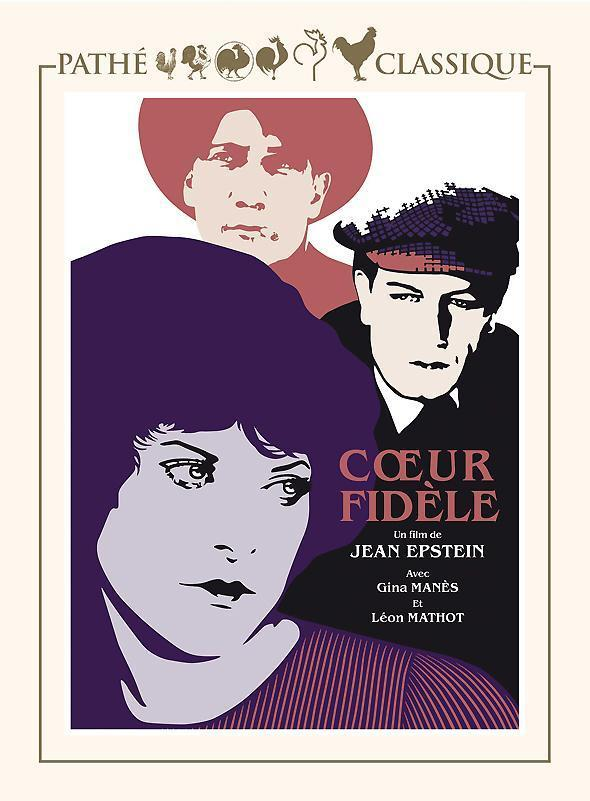
- Cœur fidèle (1923), poster
- Directed by: Jean Epstein
- Written by: Jean Epstein; Marie Epstein
- Starring: Gina Manès; Léon Mathot; Edmond Van Daële; Marie Epstein
- Cinematography: Léon Donnot; Paul Guichard; Henri Stuckert
- Production company: Pathé
- Release date: 23 November 1923
- Running time: 87 minutes (on DVD 2007)
- Country: France
- Languages: Silent film French intertitles

Cœur fidèle (Faithful Heart)

Cœur fidèle is a 1923 French drama film directed by Jean Epstein. It has the alternative English title Faithful Heart. The film tells a melodramatic story of thwarted romance, set against a background of the Marseille docks, and experiments with many techniques of camerawork and editing.

== Plot ==
Marie was an orphan adopted by a bar-owner and his wife in the port of Marseille, and now she is harshly exploited by them as a servant in the bar. She is desired by Petit Paul, a thuggish layabout, but is secretly in love with Jean, a dockworker. Marie is forced to leave with Petit Paul, but Jean follows them to a fairground where the two men fight. In the brawl a policeman is stabbed and, while Petit Paul escapes, Jean is arrested and gaoled.

A year later, Jean rediscovers Marie, now with a sick baby and living with Petit Paul, who spends all their money on drink. Jean tries to support Marie, aided by a crippled woman, who lives next door; but Petit Paul, warned by gossiping neighbours that Jean is seeing Marie, returns for a violent confrontation, this time armed with a gun. In the ensuing struggle, the crippled woman obtains the gun and kills Petit Paul.

In an epilogue, we see Jean and Marie finally free to love each other, though their faces suggest that experience has taken its toll on their lives.

== Cast ==
- Léon Mathot as Jean
- Gina Manès as Marie
- Edmond Van Daële as Petit Paul
- Claude Bénédict as M. Hochon
- Madame Maufroy as Mme. Hochon
- Marie Epstein (credited as "Mlle Marice") as crippled woman
- Madeleine Erickson as prostitute

== Production and style ==
Jean Epstein had already established himself as a film theorist with the publication of several books, and he had begun to explore his ideas in practice with his first two films, Pasteur (1922) and L'Auberge rouge (1923). Epstein now chose to film a simple story of love and violence "to win the confidence of those, still so numerous, who believe that only the lowest melodrama can interest the public", and also in the hope of creating "a melodrama so stripped of all the conventions ordinarily attached to the genre, so sober, so simple, that it might approach the nobility and excellence of tragedy". He wrote the scenario in a single night.

Epstein had been much impressed by Abel Gance's recently completed La Roue, and in Cœur fidèle he similarly applied rhythmic editing, overlays, close-ups, and point-of-view shots. The opening sequence establishes Marie's situation in the harbour bar through montage: we see close-up images of her face, hands, and the table and glasses she is cleaning. Later, images of the sea and the port are intercut and overlaid to convey her relationship with Jean. The film's most celebrated sequence, set at a fairground, employs rhythmic editing to chart the escalating tension of the love triangle. In the film's second half, Epstein employs dramatic lighting effects and lens distortion effects to convey the melodrama of the situation, as well as subjective states, such as Petit Paul's drinking.

The film's technical experiments are balanced throughout by the realism of the setting. The characters are unglamorous and belong to a working-class milieu, living in cheap lodgings, frequenting rough bar-rooms. Cœur fidèle is one of several early films to use the location of the Marseille dockside (in the wake of Louis Delluc's Fièvre, and looking forward to Alberto Cavalcanti's En rade), and the evocative images of looming ships and deserted wharfs contribute to a style which would be characterized over the next decade and a half as "poetic realism" (cf. L'Atalante, Quai des brumes (Port of Shadows)).

== Reception ==
The film was not a success with the public. Its initial run in Paris in 1923 was terminated after three days (because of disputes among the audience). A re-release in the following year saw a steady decline in the size of its audience. Among critics and other film-makers however Cœur fidèle attracted considerable attention and has continued to do so. Georges Sadoul said that the film "was a sensation, and was to remain [Epstein's] best film"; "it touches us still by its fidelity to everyday life". René Clair wrote enthusiastically about it: " Cœur fidèle must be seen if you want to understand the resources of the cinema today. ...For a film to be worthy of the cinema, that's already a very welcome miracle! Cœur fidèle is worthy of it on more than one account."
