= Sidney Peterson =

American artist and filmmaker

Sidney Peterson (November 15, 1905 – April 24, 2000), was an American writer, artist, avant-garde filmmaker, and educator. He founded the first film courses at the California School of Fine Arts (now San Francisco Art Institute) in 1947.

== Biography ==
Sidney Peterson was born on November 15, 1905, in Oakland, California. He attended UC Berkeley, worked as a newspaper reporter in Monterey, and spent time as a practicing painter and sculptor in France in the 1920s and 1930s.

After World War II, Peterson founded Workshop 20 at the California School of Fine Arts (renamed the San Francisco Art Institute), initiating filmmaking courses at the school.

Between 1947 and 1950 the workshop produced five films under Peterson's guidance that were influential on the burgeoning American avant-garde cinema, and significant artifacts of the San Francisco Renaissance. In the years that followed, Peterson worked as a consultant for the Museum of Modern Art, made a series of documentary films, penned a novel (A Fly in the Pigment, 1961) and a memoir (The Dark of the Screen, 1980), and worked at Walt Disney Productions as a scriptwriter and storyboard artist on the never completed sequel to Fantasia.

He died on April 24, 2000, in New York City, New York, at the age of 94.

Peterson's films are distributed by Canyon Cinema in San Francisco and The Film Makers Cooperative in New York City. A 2007 comic strip by Dave Kiersh in Syncopated Volume 3 (Syncopated Comics, 2007) tells of his relationship with Peterson, who was a friend of Kiersh's grandmother. On December 30, 2009, the Library of Congress named Peterson's The Lead Shoes (1949) to the National Film Registry.

== Selected filmography ==
- The Potted Psalm (1946) with James Broughton
- Horror Dream (1947)
- The Cage (1947)
- The Petrified Dog (1948)
- Clinic of Stumble (1948)
- Mr. Frenhofer and the Minotaur (1949)
- The Lead Shoes (1949)
- Architectural Millinery (1954)
- Man in a Bubble (1981)

== Bibliography ==
- A Fly In The Pigment (1961)

Angel Island Publications

- The Dark Of The Screen (1980)

Anthology Film Archives and New York University Press
