= Louis Delluc =

French film director (1890–1924)

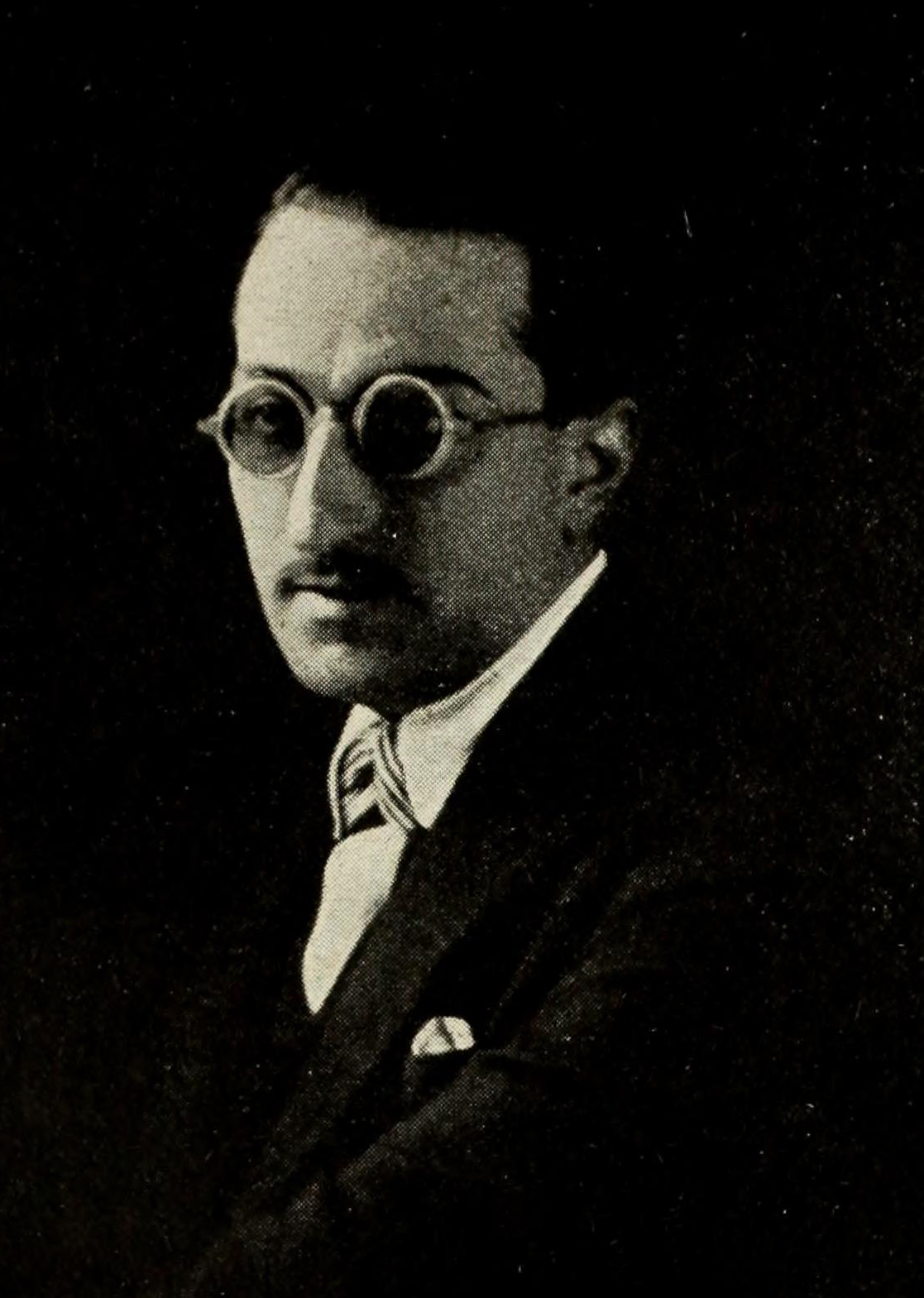
- Born: 14 October 1890; Cadouin, France
- Died: 22 March 1924 (aged 33); Paris, France
- Occupations: Film director, screenwriter, film critic
- Notable work: La Femme de nulle part
- Spouse: Ève Francis (m. 1918)

Louis Delluc (French: [dɛlyk]; 14 October 1890 – 22 March 1924) was an Impressionist French film director, screenwriter and film critic.

== Biography ==
Delluc was born in Cadouin in 1890. His family moved to Paris in 1903. After graduating from the university, he became a literary critic. On the end of the First World War, he married the French actress Ève Francis (born in Belgium), who acted in six of his seven films.

In 1917, Delluc began his career in film criticism. He went on to edit Le Journal du Ciné-club and Cinéa, established film societies, and directed seven films. He was one of the early Impressionist filmmakers, along with Abel Gance, Germaine Dulac, Marcel L'Herbier, and Jean Epstein. His films are notable for their focus on ordinary events and the natural setting rather than on adventures and antics. Many of his early film writings for French newspapers were collected in the volume Cinéma et Cie (1919). He also wrote one of the first books on Charlie Chaplin (1921; translated into English in 1922).

Delluc directed his seventh and final film, L'Inondation (The Flood), in 1924. Filming took place in very poor weather conditions and Delluc contracted pneumonia. He died in Paris several weeks later from tuberculosis, before the film was released.

The Prix Louis-Delluc, an award dedicated to French films which was created in 1936, is named in his honour.

== Filmography ==
Fièvre (1921)

- 1920: Fumée noire
- 1920: Le Silence
- 1920: Le Chemin d'Ernoa
- 1921: Fièvre
- 1921: Le Tonnerre (The Thunder), short based on Mark Twain's 1880 story "“Mrs. McWilliams and the Lightning”
- 1922: La Femme de nulle part
- 1924: L'Inondation
