= Slavko Vorkapich =

Serbian-American film director and montagist (1894 –1976)

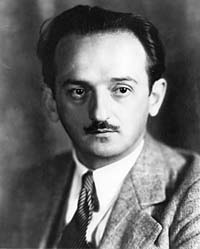
- Born: Slavoljub Vorkapić; March 17, 1894; Dobrinci, Austria-Hungary (modern-day Vojvodina, Serbia)
- Died: October 20, 1976 (aged 82); Mijas, Spain
- Occupations: Filmmaker, artist

Slavoljub "Slavko" Vorkapić (Serbian Cyrillic: Славољуб "Славко" Воркапић; March 17, 1894 – October 20, 1976), known in English as Slavko Vorkapich, was a Serbian-born Hollywood montagist, an independent cinematic artist, chair of USC School of Cinematic Arts, chair of the Belgrade Film and Theatre Academy, painter, and illustrator. He was a prominent figure of modern cinematography and motion picture film art during the early and mid-20th century and was a cinema theorist and lecturer.

== Early life ==
Slavoljub Vorkapić was born on March 17, 1894, in the small village of Dobrinci, near Ruma in the Srem region, at the time part of the Kingdom of Croatia and Slavonia, Austro-Hungarian Empire (now Vojvodina, Serbia).

His father, Petar, the town clerk, insisted that young Slavko be well-educated. After finishing his primary education, he became a student in a well-known regional high-school in the nearby town of Sremska Mitrovica, where he made his first steps in art and drawing. (Mileva Marić-Einstein, the first wife and work associate of Albert Einstein attended the same high school.)

He continued his high-school education in Zemun and later in the famous Art School in Belgrade. With a scholarship received from Matica srpska, Serbia's highest cultural and scientific institution at the time, Vorkapić went to Budapest, Hungary, where he studied art. At the beginning of World War I, he immediately returned to his homeland where, with the country besieged on all sides, he survived the tragic Serbian retreat across Albania in order to reach Allied positions in Greece.

From there he sailed to Italy, from where he reached France. He managed to enter Art Academy in Paris but soon after moved to Montparnasse among other Avant-garde artists. He took part in the 1917 and 1919 collective painter exhibits.

== Career ==
Slavko Vorkapich's dream to go to the United States was fulfilled in 1920. For a short time, he lived in New York City. Then, for almost a year, he roamed the country nearly homeless, until his arrival in Hollywood in July 1921.

Although he started his motion picture career as a painter and an actor, he became best known as a montagist, special effects expert, cinematic artist, cinema teacher, editor, and became one of the most respected cinematic filmmakers in the period between the two World Wars. Vorkapić made a great number of cinematic documentaries and lyrical purely cinematic short-length movies. He co-wrote the screenplay for Johann the Coffinmaker (1927), a 27-minute experimental film directed by Robert Florey that involved a lot of trick photographic effects.

Vorkapić co-directed the experimental black and white short motion-picture The Life and Death of 9413: a Hollywood Extra (1928) with Robert Florey, and 2 visual tone poems, Moods of the Sea (1941) and Forest Murmurs (1947) with his Hollywood colleague, the Hungarian-born montagist and cinematic filmmaker John Hoffman (1904–1980).

His one-minute montage sequence for the otherwise lost movie Manhattan Cocktail (1928), directed by Dorothy Arzner, was released in the October 2005 DVD collection Unseen Cinema: Early American Avant Garde Film 1894-1941.

He is best known for his montage work on Hollywood movies such as Crime Without Passion (1934), Dr. Jekyll and Mr. Hyde (1941), Viva Villa! (1934), David Copperfield (1935), The Good Earth (1937), Three Comrades (1938) and Mr. Smith Goes to Washington (1939). Vorkapich used kinetic editing, lap dissolves, tracking shots, creative graphics and optical effects for his montage sequences for such features as Manhattan Melodrama (1934), Maytime, The Firefly (both 1937), San Francisco (1936) and Meet John Doe (1941). He created, shot, and edited these kinesthetic montages for features at Universal Pictures, MGM, RKO, and Paramount. He directed a short documentary movie for RKO, Private Smith of the U.S.A., that was nominated for an Academy Award.

Vorkapich is credited for editing and montage on Moscow Strikes Back (1942), one of four winners at the 15th Academy Awards for Best Documentary Feature.

He was appointed chair of the Department of Film of the University of Southern California from 1948 to 1950. During the 1950s, he was in Yugoslavia and worked as a professor at the Belgrade Film and Theatre Academy. In Yugoslavia in 1955, Vorkapić directed a full-length motion picture, Hanka.

== Personal life ==
In 1938, Vorkapich commissioned modern architect Gregory Ain to build a garden house for his residence in Beverly Hills. It was a minor landmark in prefabricated architecture. It has since been destroyed.

Two of his many master drawings, his gift during a visit to Yugoslavia, are kept in the Srem Museum in Sremska Mitrovica.

His later wife was Marie Denyse Sentous of Los Angeles, California, USA. They were married July 21, 1928 in Santa Barbara, California, USA.

== Death ==
Slavko Vorkapić died of a heart attack in Mijas, Spain on the estate of his son Edvard who was a cinematographer on October 20, 1976, aged 82.

== Influence and legacy ==
The now-common montage sequence often appeared as a notation in Hollywood screenplays of the 1930s and 40s as the "Vorkapich" because of his mastery of the dynamic visual montage sequence wherein time and space are compressed using a variety of cinematic techniques, such as kinetic montage, camera tricks, optical printer effects, dolly shots, & stylized graphics. Sometimes moviemakers will simply refer to the technique as "a Vorkapich".

Vorkapich's protege Art Clokey learned kinescope animation techniques under him at USC Film School and went on to use them to create the Gumby animated series.

Better Call Saul creator Peter Gould has cited Vorkapich as a major influence for the two and a half minute montage sequence seen from 27:33–30:00 in the Season 1 finale, "Marco".

== See also ==
- Pure cinema
- Montage (filmmaking)
- Cinematic techniques
- Experimental film
- Abstract film

== Sources ==
- The Most Typical Avant-Garde. James, David – 2005
- On True Cinema. Babac, Marko – 1998
- Slavko Vorkapich: Reminiscences. Davis, Ronald – 1978
