= The Three-Sided Mirror =

1927 film directed by Jean Epstein

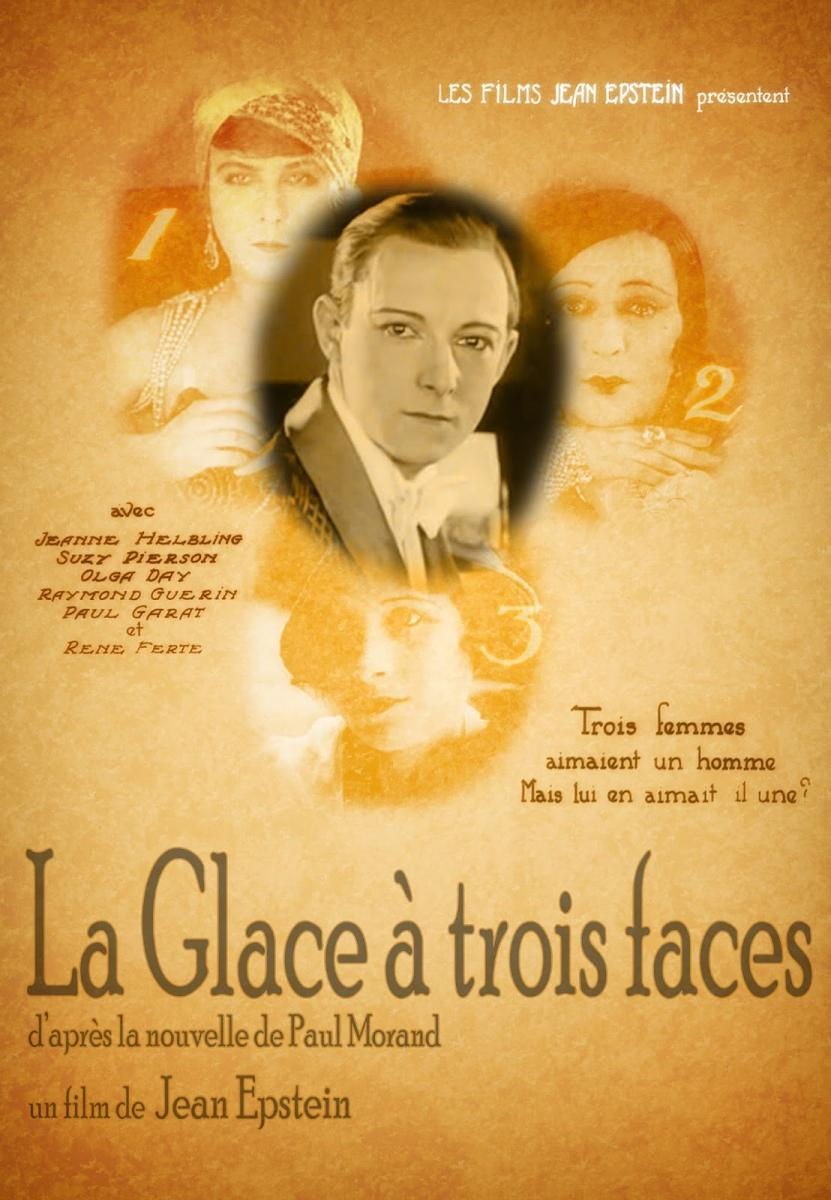
- The Three-Sided Mirror (1927), poster
- Directed by: Jean Epstein
- Screenplay by: Jean Epstein
- Based on: "La Glace à trois faces" by Paul Morand
- Cinematography: Marcel Eywinger
- Production company: Les Films Jean Epstein
- Distributed by: C. U. C.
- Release date: 22 November 1927
- Running time: 39 minutes
- Country: France
- Language: French

The Three-Sided Mirror (1927) by Jean Epstein

The Three-Sided Mirror (French: La glace à trois faces) is a 1927 French drama film directed by Jean Epstein, starring Jeanne Helbling, Suzy Pierson and Olga Day. It tells the story of three women who remember their love affairs with the same young man. The film is based on Paul Morand's short story with the same title. It was shot during the summer of 1927. It premiered on 22 November the same year.

== Cast ==
- Jeanne Helbling as Lucie
- Suzy Pierson as Athalia
- Olga Day as Pearl
- René Ferté as the man
- Raymond Guérin-Catelain as the suitor

== Reception ==
The film received many compliments for its technical achievements upon the release. René Jeanne of La Rumeur wrote: "The Three-Sided Mirror is definitely the best film Mr. Epstein has given us in a long time, both because of the intelligence with which he has entered Mr. Paul Morand's thoughts, and the sensibility with which he has translated these thoughts into cinema."
