= David Shepard (film preservationist) =

- Born: October 22, 1940; New York City
- Died: January 31, 2017 (aged 76); Medford, Oregon
- Occupation: Film preservationist
- Known for: Responsible for many high quality video versions of silent films

David Haspel Shepard (October 22, 1940 – January 31, 2017) was an American film preservationist whose company, Film Preservation Associates, is responsible for many high-quality video versions of silent films. Some come from the Blackhawk Films library (owned by Shepard) and others from materials owned by private collectors and film archives around the world.

== Biography ==
Shepard was born in Manhattan, New York City, the son of Marjorie (née Haspel) and Bertram Shepard. His father was an executive with the Grand Union grocery-store chain, and his mother a homemaker. When he was 11 years old his family moved to Tenafly, New Jersey.

As a teenager he filmed school football games for the coaches to study, and in the off-season began to make his own films with student actors. He graduated from Hamilton College, in Clinton, New York, in 1962, with a BA in philosophy, and completed a master's degree from the Annenberg School for Communication at the University of Pennsylvania in 1963.

Shepard began restoring films when he joined the American Film Institute in 1968 as one of their first staff members. In 1987, he bought the Blackhawk Films library.

In December 2016, he suffered pneumonia and kidney disease and was hospitalized. Doctors discovered cancer in his chest and he died on January 31, 2017, in Medford, Oregon.

Most of the collections of David Shepard and Film Preservation Associates are held at the Academy Film Archive as part of the Lobster Film/Film Preservation Associates Collection.

== Affiliates ==
- Film Preservation Associates, Serge Bromberg (Lobster Films)
- Film Preservation Associates, Benjamin Scott Baker (Assistant to Producer)

== Partial list of restored films ==
- 20,000 Leagues Under the Sea (1916)
- A Farewell to Arms (1932)
- A Woman of Paris (1923)
- Aelita (1924)
- The Affairs of Anatol (1921)
- America (1924)
- Atlantis (1913)
- Destiny (1921)
- The Battle at Elderbush Gulch (1914)
- The Birth of a Nation (1915)
- The Black Pirate (1926)
- The Cabinet of Dr. Caligari (1920)
- Carmen (1915)
- The Cat and the Canary (1927)
- The Cheat (1915)
- City Lights (1931)
- Cobra (1925)
- Convict 13 (1920)
- The Coward (1915)
- Destiny (1921)
- Don Q Son of Zorro (1925)
- Dr. Jekyll and Mr. Hyde (1920)
- Dr. Mabuse: The Gambler (1922)
- Earth (1930)
- The Emperor Jones (1933)
- Faces of Children (1925)
- Faust (1926)
- Foolish Wives (1922)
- Flirting With Fate (1916)
- The Gaucho (1927)
- The General (1926)
- Go West (1925)
- The Gold Rush (1925)
- The Great Train Robbery (1903)
- His New Job (1915)
- The Hunchback of Notre Dame (1923)
- The Indian Tomb (1921)
- Intolerance (1916)
- The Italian (1915)
- J'accuse (1919)
- Kean (1924)
- The Kid (1921)
- A King in New York (1957)
- The Last Laugh (1924)
- Leaves from Satan's Book (1921)
- Long Pants (1927)
- The Lost World (1925), restored version released April 6, 2001
- The Love of Jeanne Ney (1927)
- Male and Female (1919)
- Man With a Movie Camera (1929)
- The Mark of Zorro (1920)
- The Marriage Circle (1924)
- The Married Virgin (1918)
- The Matrimaniac (1916)
- Meet John Doe (1941)
- Modern Times (1936)
- The Mollycoddle (1920)
- Monte Cristo (1922)
- Moods of the Sea (1941)
- Nanook of the North (1922)
- The Navigator (1924)
- The Non-Stop Kid (1918)
- Nosferatu (1922), restored version released January 2, 2001
- Oliver Twist (1922)
- Orphans of the Storm (1921)
- Our Daily Bread (1934)
- Outside the Law (1920)
- The Phantom of the Opera (1925)
- The Pilgrim (1923)
- Prison Train (1938)
- Regeneration (1915)
- Robin Hood (1922)
- La Roue (1923)
- Sally of the Sawdust (1925)
- Salome (1923)
- Seven Years Bad Luck (1921)
- Shadows (1922)
- The Sheik (1921)
- Siegfried (1924)
- Sherlock Jr. (1924)
- The Sin of Nora Moran (1933)
- The Son of the Sheik (1926)
- Steamboat Bill, Jr. (1928)
- Storm Over Asia (1928)
- Strike (1925)
- The Strong Man (1926)
- Sunrise: A Song of Two Humans (1927)
- Tempest (1928)
- The Testament of Dr. Mabuse (1933)
- The Thief of Bagdad (1924)
- The Three Musketeers (1921)
- Tillie's Punctured Romance (1914)
- Tol'able David (1921)
- Traffic in Souls (1913)
- Tramp, Tramp, Tramp (1926)
- True Heart Susie (1919)
- Twenty Minutes of Love (1914)
- Les Vampires (1915)
- The Volga Boatman (1926)
- Within Our Gates (1920)

== Awards ==
Year	Award	Category	Result
1989	International Documentary Association	Preservation and Scholarship Award	Won
1999	Saturn Award	The President's Memorial Award	Won
2000	San Francisco International Film Festival	Mel Novikoff Award	Won
2005	Los Angeles Film Critics Association	Special Citation	Won
2006	National Society of Film Critics	Special Award	Won
2011	Denver Silent Film Festival	Lifetime Achievement Award	Won
