= The Fall of the House of Usher (1928 French film) =

1928 film directed by Jean Epstein

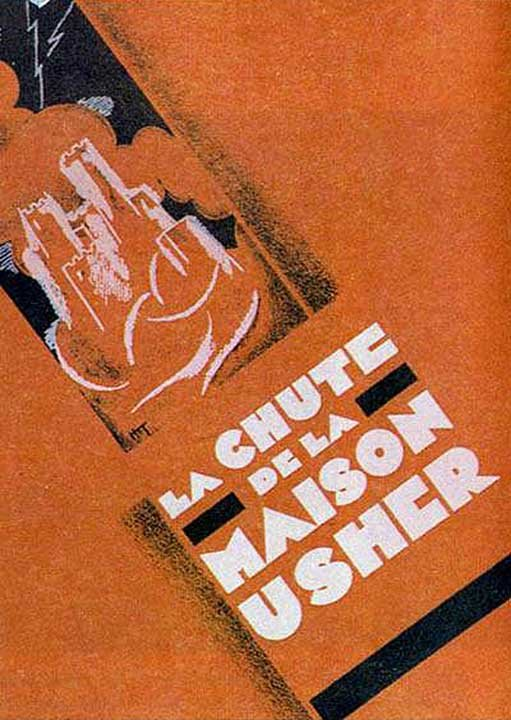
- The Fall of the House of Usher (1928), poster
- Directed by: Jean Epstein
- Screenplay by: Luis Buñuel; Jean Epstein
- Based on: The Fall of the House of Usher by Edgar Allan Poe
- Produced by: Jean Epstein
- Starring: Marguerite Gance; Jean Debucourt; Charles Lamy
- Cinematography: Georges Lucas, Jean Lucas
- Production company: Les Films Jean Epstein
- Distributed by: Potemkine Films (French re-releases)
- Release date: 4 October 1928
- Running time: 65 minutes
- Country: France
- Languages: Silent film French intertitles

The Fall of the House of Usher (French: La chute de la maison Usher) is a 1928 French horror film directed by Jean Epstein, one of several films based on the 1839 Gothic short story The Fall of the House of Usher by Edgar Allan Poe.

== Plot ==
The Fall of the House of Usher (1928)

Roderick Usher summons his friend to his crumbling old mansion in the remote countryside. Usher has been obsessed with painting a portrait of his dying wife Madeline. When she passes away, Usher has her buried in the family crypt, but the audience soon discovers that Madeline wasn't really dead, that she was buried alive in the tomb. Madeline revives from her catalepsy, exits her coffin and returns to her shocked husband.

== Cast ==
- Jean Debucourt as Roderick Usher
- Marguerite Gance as Madeline Usher
- Abel Gance
- Charles Lamy as the guest invited to the mansion
- Fournez-Goffard
- Luc Dartagnan

== Production ==
The Fall of the House of Usher was written by Luis Buñuel and Jean Epstein. The film was Buñuel's second film credit, he having previously worked as an assistant director on Epstein's film Mauprat. Following an argument with Epstein about his interpretation of the material, Buñuel left the production. Among the changes in the story from the original material was the relationship between Roderick and his sister which was changed to man and wife in the film. Usher's obsession with completing a painting of his dying wife is a detail more synonymous to another of Poe's works, The Oval Portrait, rather than House of Usher. Film critic and historian Troy Howarth stated it was unclear how much if anything of Buñuel's writing was included in the finished film.

== Release ==
The film was released on 28 October 1928.

The Poe story was released again in 1928 directed by James Sibley Watson, in 1950 by Ivan Barnett, and in 1960 by Roger Corman.

== Reception ==
From retrospective reviews, critic Troy Howarth commented that the film was "one of the most renowned of experimental silent films" noting "The rapid cutting, fetishistic closeups and generally dreamy ambience bring the movie closer to the realm of filmic poetry than anything else". Howarth concluded that the film was Epstein's "most enduring contribution to cinema".

American critic Roger Ebert included the film on his list of "Great Movies". In 2021, The Daily Star ranked The Fall of the House of Usher 8th on its list of the greatest short story adaptations, praising it for "manag[ing] the almost impossible feat of the perfect Edgar Allan Poe adaption".

It was listed by Paste magazine in 2021 as one of the "13 Best Edgar Allan Poe Adaptations".

== See also ==
- The Fall of the House of Usher (1928 American film)

== Footnotes ==
=== Sources ===
- Workman, Christopher; Howarth, Troy (2016). Tome of Terror: Horror Films of the Silent Era. Midnight Marquee Press. ISBN 978-1936168-68-2.
