= Germaine Dulac =

French film director and producer

- Born: Charlotte Elisabeth Germaine Saisset-Schneider; 17 November 1882; Amiens, Somme, Picardy, France
- Died: 20 July 1942 (aged 59); Paris, France
- Occupations: Film director, screenwriter, film producer
- Years active: 1915–1935
- Spouse: Louis-Albert Dulac (1906–1920)
- Relatives: Charles Schneider

Germaine Dulac (French: [dylak]; born Charlotte Elisabeth Germaine Saisset-Schneider; 17 November 1882 – 20 July 1942) was a French filmmaker, film theorist, journalist and critic. She was born in Amiens and moved to Paris in early childhood. A few years after her marriage she embarked on a journalistic career in a feminist magazine, and later became interested in film. With the help of her husband and friend she founded a film company and directed a few commercial works before slowly moving into Impressionist and Surrealist territory. She is best known today for her Impressionist film, La Souriante Madame Beudet (The Smiling Madam Beudet, 1922/23), and her Surrealist experiment, La Coquille et le Clergyman (The Seashell and the Clergyman, 1928). Her career as filmmaker suffered after the introduction of sound film and she spent the last decade of her life working on newsreels for Pathé and Gaumont.

== Biography ==
Germaine Dulac was born in Amiens, France into an upper-middle-class family of a career military officer. Her mother, Madeleine-Claire Waymel came from a middle-class family of mainly career soldiers and industrialists. Her father, Pierre-Maurice Saisset-Schneider, was a captain of cavalry in the Second Army Corp. Since her father's job required the family to frequently move between small garrison towns, Germaine was sent to live with her grandmother in Paris. She soon became interested in art and studied music, painting, and theater. Following the death of her parents, Dulac moved to Paris and combined her growing interests in socialism and feminism with a career in journalism. In 1905 she married Louis-Albert Dulac, an agricultural engineer who also came from an upper-class family. Four years later she began writing for La Française, a feminist magazine edited by Jane Misme where she eventually became the drama critic. Dulac also found time to work on the editorial staff of La Fronde, a radical feminist journal of the time. She also began to pursue her interest in still photography, which preceded her initial entry into filmmaking.

Dulac and her husband divorced in 1920. After that, she began a relationship with Marie-Anne Colson-Malleville that lasted until the end of her life.

Following her long and influential cinema career, Dulac became the president of the Fédération des ciné-clubs, a group which promoted and presented the work of new young filmmakers, such as Joris Ivens and Jean Vigo. Dulac also taught film courses at the École Technique de Photographie et de Cinématographie on the rue de Vaugirard. Following her death in 1942, Charles Ford called attention to the difficulty the French Press had with printing her obituary:

Bothered by Dulac’s non-conformist ideas, disturbed by her impure origins, the censors had refused the article which, only after vigorous protest by the editor-in-chief of the magazine, appeared three weeks late. Even dead, Germaine Dulac still seemed dangerous...

== Career ==
Before her filmmaking career, Dulac wrote articles for the feminist magazine La Fronde from 1900 to 1913. In 1909, she began writing for La Française as a journalist, then later as an editor until 1913. Here she interviewed a plethora of established women in France with the intention of solidifying women's roles in French society and politics. One of those women was Anna de Noailles, a French poet, as her first assignment. However, when Dulac got to her door, she panicked and interviewed Noaille's valet de chambre. Soon after, she moved to theatrical criticism, but still occasionally contributed to La Fronde. Her experience as a theatrical critic sparked her interest in film and kickstarted her career in film.

Dulac became interested in film in 1914 through her friend, actress Stacia Napierkowska. The two women traveled to Italy together shortly before World War I; Napierkowska was to act in a Film d'Art film, and Dulac learned the basics of the medium during that trip. In the early 1900s through the late 1920s, Dulac frequently contrasted the modernity of the French capital to the provincial nature of rural France, a common dichotomy in her films. Soon after her return to France she decided to start a film company. Dulac and writer Irène Hillel-Erlanger then founded D.H. Films, with financial support provided by Dulac's husband. The company produced several films between 1915 and 1920, all directed by Dulac and written by Hillel-Erlanger. These included Les Sœurs ennemies (1915/16; Dulac's first film), Vénus victrix, ou Dans l'ouragan de la vie (1917), Géo, le mystérieux (ou La vraie richesse, 1916), and others.

Dulac's first major success was Âmes de fous (1918), a serial melodrama written by Dulac herself. The film features an early appearance of actress Ève Francis, who introduced Dulac to Francis' friend (and later husband) Louis Delluc, filmmaker and critic. A short time later Dulac and Delluc collaborated on La Fête espagnole (Spanish Fiesta, 1920), another film featuring Francis, which was proclaimed one of the decade's more influential films and allegedly a major French Impressionist Cinema work. However, only a few excerpts from the film exist today. Dulac and Delluc went on to collaborate on a number of pictures.

In 1921, Dulac reflected on a meeting with D.W. Griffith in an article she wrote titled "Chez D.W. Griffith." In the article, Dulac presented two popular themes which arise in many of her films:

- Autonomy for the cinema as an independent art form free from the influences of painting and literature.
- The importance of the filmmaker as an individual artistic and creative force.

The Seashell and the Clergyman (1928)

She continued her career in filmmaking, producing both simple commercial films and complex pre-Surrealist narratives such as two of her most famous works: La Souriante Madame Beudet (The Smiling Madame Beudet, 1922/23) and La Coquille et le Clergyman (The Seashell and the Clergyman, 1928). Both films were released before the epoch-making Un Chien Andalou (1929) by Luis Buñuel and Salvador Dalí, and La Coquille et le Clergyman is sometimes credited as the first Surrealist film; however, some scholars, such as Ephraim Katz, consider Dulac first and foremost an Impressionist filmmaker. Dulac's goal of "pure cinema" and some of her works inspired the French Cinema pur film movement. Her other important experimental films include several shorts based on music: Disque(s) 957 (1928/29; based on Chopin) and Thème et variations (1928/29; classical music), and others from the same period.

In 1929, she was awarded the Legion of Honor in recognition of her contributions to the film industry in France. With the advent of sound film, Dulac's career shifted. From 1930, she returned to commercial work, producing newsreels for Pathé and later for Gaumont. She died in Paris on 20 July 1942.

== Filmography ==
The exact chronology of Dulac's oeuvre has not yet been established.

| Year | Film | Also known as | Credits |
|---|---|---|---|
| 1915 | Les Sœurs ennemies | — | Director |
| 1917 | Géo, le mystérieux | Mysterious George, True Wealth | Director |
| 1917 | Venus victrix | Dans l'ouragan de la vie | Director |
| 1918 | Âmes de fous | — | Director |
| 1918 | La Jeune Fille la plus méritante de France | — | Director |
| 1919 | Le Bonheur des autres | — | Director |
| 1919 | La Cigarette | The Cigarette | Director |
| 1920 | La Fête espagnole | Spanish Fiesta | Director |
| 1920 | Malencontre | — | Director |
| 1921 | La Belle Dame sans merci | — | Director |
| 1922 | La Mort du soleil | The Death of the Sun | Director |
| 1922 | Werther | — | Director |
| 1923 | Gossette | — | Director |
| 1923 | La Souriante Madame Beudet | The Smiling Madame Beudet | Director, Writer |
| 1924 | Âme d'artiste | Heart of an Actress | Director, Writer |
| 1924 | Le Diable dans la ville | The Devil in the City | Director |
| 1925 | Le Réveil | – | Director |
| 1926 | La Folie des vaillants | The Madness of the Valiants | Director |
| 1927 | Antoinette Sabrier | — | Director, Writer |
| 1927 | Le Cinéma au service de l'histoire | — | Director |
| 1927 | L'Invitation au voyage | Invitation to a Journey | Director, Writer |
| 1928 | La Coquille et le Clergyman | The Seashell and the Clergyman | Director, Writer, Producer |
| 1928 | Danses espagnoles | — | Director |
| 1928 | Disque 957 | Disque 927 | Director |
| 1928 | La Germination d'un haricot | — | Director |
| 1928 | Mon Paris | — | Supervisor |
| 1928 | Princess Mandane | — | Director |
| 1928 | Thèmes et variations | — | Director |
| 1929 | Étude cinégraphique sur une arabesque | Arabesque | Director |
| 1930 | Autrefois, aujourd'hui | — | Director |
| 1930 | Celles qui s'en font | — | Director |
| 1930 | Ceux qui ne s'en font pas | — | Director |
| 1930 | Jour de fête | — | Director |
| 1930 | Un peu de rêve sur le faubourg | — | Director |
| 1932 | Le Picador | — | Supervisor |
| 1934 | Je n'ai plus rien | — | Director |
| 1935 | Le Retour à la vie | — | Co-director |
| 1935 | Le Cinéma au service de l'histoire | — | Director |
| 1939 | Ce qu'il a dit, ce qu'il a fait | — | Director |
