= Jean Epstein =

French film director, essayist and novelist

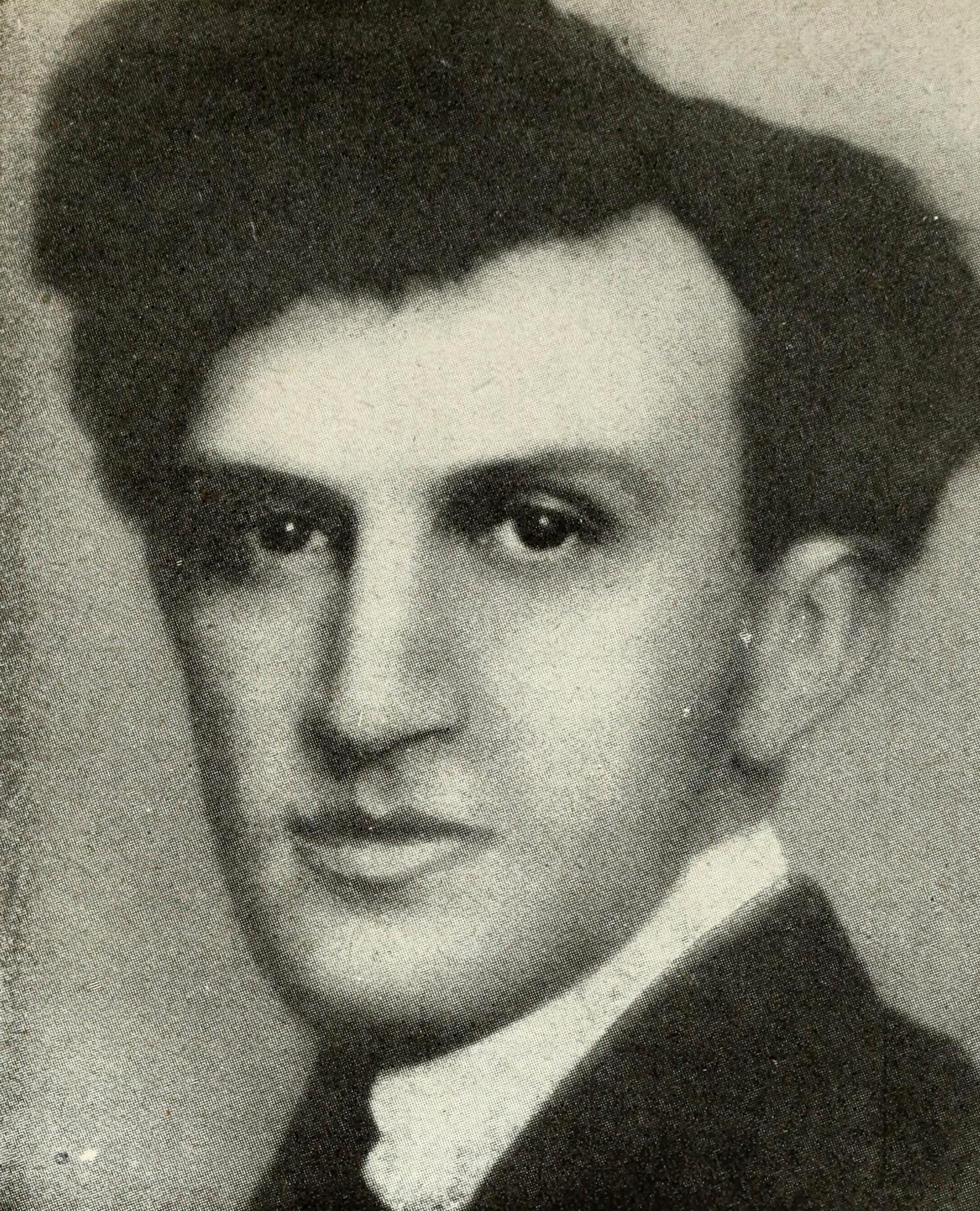
- Epstein (≈1920)
- Born: 25 March 1897; Warsaw, Tsardom of Poland, Russian Empire
- Died: 2 April 1953 (aged 56); Paris, France
- Occupations: Film director; film theorist; literary critic; novelist
- Years active: 1922–1953
- Relatives: Marie Epstein (sister)

Jean Epstein (French: [ʒɑ̃ ɛpʃtajn]; 25 March 1897 – 2 April 1953) was a French filmmaker, film theorist, literary critic, and novelist. Although he is remembered today primarily for his adaptation of Edgar Allan Poe's The Fall of the House of Usher, he directed three dozen films and was an influential critic of literature and film from the early 1920s through the late 1940s. He is often associated with French Impressionist Cinema and the concept of photogénie.

== Life and career ==
Epstein was born in Warsaw, Kingdom of Poland (then a part of the Russian Empire) to a French-Jewish father and Polish mother. After his father died in 1908, the family relocated to Switzerland, where Epstein remained until beginning medical school at the University of Lyon in France. While in Lyon, Epstein served as a secretary and translator for Auguste Lumière, considered one of the founders of cinema.

Epstein started directing his own films in 1922 with Pasteur, followed by L'Auberge rouge and Cœur fidèle (both 1923). Film director Luis Buñuel worked as an assistant director to Epstein on Mauprat (1926) and La Chute de la maison Usher (1928). Epstein's criticism appeared in the early modernist journal L'Esprit Nouveau.

During the making of Cœur fidèle, Epstein chose to film a simple story of love and violence "to win the confidence of those, still so numerous, who believe that only the lowest melodrama can interest the public", and also in the hope of creating "a melodrama so stripped of all the conventions ordinarily attached to the genre, so sober, so simple, that it might approach the nobility and excellence of tragedy".

He made several documentaries about Brittany. These include Finis Terræ filmed in Ouessant, Mor vran (The sea of the crows, in Breton) filmed in Sein, L'Or des mers filmed in Hoëdic, and Le Tempestaire filmed in Belle Île.

During the German occupation of France, he was not allowed to work in any studio, and was even temporarily detained by the Gestapo alongside his sister Marie, because of his Jewish origin but was able to escape deportation, due to the intervention of his friends in the International Red Cross.

Chanson d'Armor is known as the first Breton-language film in history. His two novels also take place in Breton isles: L'Or des mers in Ouessant and Les Recteurs et la sirène in Sein. In August 2005, his films The Three-Sided Mirror (1927) and Le Tempestaire (1947) were restored and re-released on the DVD collection Avant-Garde: Experimental Cinema of the 1920s and 1930s.

Epstein died in 1953 from a cerebral hemorrhage.

== Film Theory ==
Paradoxically, Jean Epstein's significance as a stylist, poet, and theoretician has grown despite the absence of his films. Many of his masterpieces, including "Mor'Vran" (1931), "L'Or des mers" (1933), and "Les Berceaux" (1934), have never undergone restoration. Nevertheless, his early writings brought significant inspiration within European continental philosophy, specifically those currents dealing with realism and materialism.

=== Lyrosophie ===
His theory of film began with La Lyrosophie (1922), a companion piece to his La Poésie d'aujourd'hui, un nouvel état d'intelligence (1921). Although La Lyrosophie only skirts the question of the cinema, this book posits that the general intellectual fatigue arising from the fast-paced nature of modern life, alongside an accelerated thought process, leads to a form of subjectivity termed lyrosophie. In this mode, the weakening of reason's control over the subconscious results in projecting subconscious sentiments onto the conscious intellectual plane. The theory developed emphasizes that aesthetic pleasure is intricately tied to the stimulation of ineffable subconscious emotional associations. It proposes a view of poetic language wherein the sign, regardless of the reader's subjective imposition of beauty, remains aesthetically inexpressive.

==== The Figurative Perspective ====
Epstein posits the notion that cinema possesses a magical quality due to its ability to transcend certain limitations of representation, surpassing "the resemblance of things" and achieving an "efficiency superior to forms," which he regards as the pinnacle of cinematography. However, he is keen to emphasize that these transgressions and achievements are not exclusive to a particular avant-garde cinema. In fact, Epstein was often skeptical of films primarily formal in their format.

Epstein, in an interview: "'In your opinion, do films fashioned according to the cubist or expressionist taste represent the quintessence of cinema?' This time, my answer was even more categorical: 'No, it is but an accessory of cinema and almost an ill-state for this accessory.'"

==== Descriptive Experimentation ====
In numerous instances and through various expressions, Epstein contrasts narration with an alternative system of representation more closely aligned with cinematic brilliance – what we might term a descriptive framework. Here, experimentation supplants narrative conventions with the potency of scientific inquiry, transposing it into the realm of aesthetics and aligning cinematography with three primary objectives:

- Asserting the figurative precision of analysis
- Achieving a reinterpretation of phenomena through figurative synthesis
- Affirming its own ingenuity through the selection of a fertile yet clearly delineated field of inquiry – that of movement

== Filmography ==
- Pasteur (1922)
- Les Vendanges (1922)
- La Montagne infidèle (1923)
- Cœur fidèle (1923)
- The Red Inn (1923)
- Le Lion des Mogols (1924)
- La Goutte de sang (1924)
- The Beauty from Nivernais (La Belle nivernaise, 1924)
- L'Affiche (1924)
- Le Double Amour (1925)
- The Adventures of Robert Macaire (1925)
- Mauprat (1926)
- Au pays de G. Sand (1926)
- Six and One Half Times Eleven (Six et demi onze, 1927)
- The Three-Sided Mirror (La Glace à trois faces, 1927)
- La Chute de la maison Usher (1928)
- Finis Terræ (1929)
- Sa tête (1929)
- Le Pas de la mule (1930)
- Notre-Dame de Paris (1931)
- Mor vran (1931)
- L'Or des mers (1932)
- The Man with the Hispano (L'Homme à l'Hispano, 1933)
- The Lady of Lebanon (La Châtelaine du Liban, 1934)
- Chanson d'Armor (1934)
- La Vie d'un grand journal (1934)
- Cuor di vagabondo (1936)
- La Bourgogne (1936)
- La Bretagne (1936)
- Vive la vie (1937)
- The Woman from the End of the World (1938)
- Les Bâtisseurs (1938)
- Eau vive (1938)
- La Relève (1938)
- Artères de France (1939)
- Le Tempestaire (1947)
- Les Feux de la mer (1948)
- Efforts de productivité dans la fonderie (1953)

== Publications ==
=== Literary and film theory ===
- Bonjour, cinéma. Paris: La Sirène, 1921.
- La Poésie d'aujourd'hui, un nouvel état d'intelligence. Paris: La Sirène, 1921.
- La Lyrosophie. Paris: La Sirène, 1922.
- Le Cinématographe vu de l'Etna. Paris: Les Écrivains réunis, 1926.
- La Photogénie de l'impondérable. Paris: Corymbe, 1935.
- L'Intelligence d'une machine. Paris: J. Melot, 1946.
- Le Cinéma du diable. Paris: J. Melot, 1947.
- Esprit de cinéma. Genève: Jeheber, 1955.
- Écrits sur le cinéma, 1921-1953: édition chronologique en deux volumes. Paris: Seghers, 1974–1975.

=== Fiction ===
- Les Recteurs et la sirène. Paris: Fernand Aubier/Éd. Montaigne, 1934.
- L'Or des mers. Paris: Librairie Valois, 1932.

=== Film scenarios ===
- "La chute de la maison Usher," L'Avant scène du cinéma, nos. 313-314 (October 1983).
