= List of avant-garde films of the 1930s =

A list of avant-garde and experimental films made in the 1930s. Unless where noted, all films had sound and were in black and white.

Title	Director	Cast	Nation	Notes
1930
L'Âge d'Or	Luis Buñuel	Gaston Modot, Lya Lys, Max Ernst	France	Surrealist feature, produced by Charles de Noailles
Autour de la fin du monde	Eugène Deslaw	Abel Gance	France	Extraordinary, semi-experimental "making of" documentary shot on set of Abel Gance's "La fin du monde;" silent
Apteka (Pharmacy)	Stefan Themerson, Franciszka Themerson		Poland	Rayographic animation, lost
Aimless Walk	Alexandr Hackenschmied (Alexander Hammid)		Czechoslovakia	City film
Borderline	Kenneth Macpherson	Paul Robeson, H.D.	United Kingdom	Pool film; silent
A City Symphony	Herman G. Weinberg		United States	City film, never shown, disassembled and partly used in Autumn Fire
Crying for the Carolines	Leon Schlesinger, Neil McGuire	Milton Charles	United States	A "Spooney Melodie;" Semi-abstract music short
Earth	Oleksandr Dovzhenko		Soviet Union	Silent feature; part of the director's Ukraine Trilogy.
It's a Bird	Harold Mueller	Charles Bowers, Lowell Thomas	United States	Semi-animated short where an egg transforms into an automobile
Ein Lichtspiel: Schwarz/Weiss/Grau	László Moholy-Nagy		Weimar Republic	
Light Rhythms	Francis Brugière, Oswell Blakeston		United Kingdom	Light-oriented, non-animated abstract film
Mechanical Principles	Ralph Steiner		United States	Abstract film based on machinery; sometimes dated to 1933
Mennschen am Sonntag (People on Sunday)	Curt Siodmak, Robert Siodmak, Edgar G. Ulmer, Fred Zinnemann, Rochus Gliese	Erwin Splettstößer, Brigitte Borchert	Weimar Republic	City film, partly written by Billy Wilder; silent
The Power of Suggestion	M.G. MacPherson (director), Jean D. Michelson (editor)		United States	Artkino production; Lost film
À propos de Nice	Jean Vigo		France	City film
Romance Sentimentale	Grigory Alexandrov, Sergei Eisenstein	Mara Griy	France	"Étude cinematographique"
The Story of a Nobody	Jo Gerson, Louis Hirshman		United States	Experiment in subjective camerawork, Lost film
Studie(s) Nr. 2-4	Oskar Fischinger		Weimar Republic	Abstract animations; Nr. 4 Lost
R.5, Ein Spiel in Linien (Studie Nr. 5)	Oskar Fischinger		Weimar Republic	Abstract animation
Studie Nr. 6	Oskar Fischinger		Weimar Republic	Abstract animation
Such Is Life	Carl Junghans	Vera Baranovskaya, Theodor Pištěk	Czechoslovakia	Czech avant-garde social realist feature; silent[18]
Tomatos Another Day	James Sibley Watson Jr.		United States	Absurdist comedy written by Alec Wilder
The Trap	M.G. MacPherson (director), Jean D. Michelson (editor)		United States	Artkino production, Lost film
Wochenende (Weekend)	Walter Ruttmann		Weimar Republic	Audio-only film collage; no image
Yamekraw	Murray Roth	Hugo Marianni & His Mediterraneans	United States	Vitaphone "opera film" visualization of tone poem by James Price Johnson, heavily indebted to German expressionism.
1931
Autumn Fire	Herman G. Weinberg	Erna Bergman, Willy Hildebrand	United States	Cinematic poem; mixed nature and city film
A Bronx Morning	Jay Leyda		United States	City film; silent
City of Contrasts	Irving Browning		United States	City film
Dance Film	Ralph Steiner		United States	Dance film
A Day in Santa Fe	Lynn Riggs, James Hughes		United States	City film
Douro, Faina Flouval	Manoel de Oliveira		Portugal	City film
Enthusiasm: Symphony of the Donbass	Dziga Vertov		Soviet Union	Documentary film with montage of both visuals and sound
Hearts of the West	Theodore Huff		United States	Genre parody
Imperial Valley	Seymour Stern		United States	Experimental documentary, sometimes dated to 1932 or 1933; Stern taken off production which was finished by others, Lost film
Limite	Mário Peixoto	Olga Breno, Raul Schnoor	Brazil	Advertised as 'pure cinema;' first Brazilian avant-garde film
At the Prague Castle	Alexandr Hackenschmied		Czechoslovakia	Semi-documentary
Panther Woman of the Needle Trades, or The Lovely Life of Little Lisa	Ralph Steiner	Elizabeth Hawes, Morris Carnovsky	United States	Satire, print extant at MOMA
Portrait of a Young Man in Three Movements	Henwar Rodakiewicz		United States	Feature length experimental film, begun in 1925
Studie(s) Nr. 7-9	Oskar Fischinger		Weimar Republic	Abstract animation
Surf and Seaweed	Ralph Steiner		United States	Photographic abstract film, sometimes dated to 1930.
The Light Penetrates the Darkness	Otakar Vávra, František Pilát		Czechoslovakia	Photographic abstract film
Taris, roi de l'eau	Jean Vigo		France	Documentary about a swimming champion
1932
Blood of a Poet	Jean Cocteau	Lee Miller, Pauline Carton, Odette Talazacuez	France	Surrealist feature, produced by Charles de Noailles; often misdated to 1930–31
Burleska	Jan Kučera		Czechoslovakia	Experimental short; Kučera's only film
Destiny	Josef Berne		United States	Dated "ca. 1932"
Europa	Stefan Themerson, Franciszka Themerson		Poland	Abstract animation, based on the poem by Anatol Stern; lost, but partially reconstructed in 1984
The Fortune Teller	Jerome Hill		United States	Tinting and hand-coloring added in the 1960s
Granite, a.k.a. The Quarry	Ralph Steiner		United States	
Harbor Scenes	Ralph Steiner		United States	
Histoire du soldat inconnu	Henri Storck		Belgium	
L'idée	Berthold Bartosch		France	Surreal animation; music by Arthur Honegger
Koloraturen (Coloratura)	Oskar Fischinger		Weimar Republic	Abstract animation
Kuhle Wampe	Bertolt Brecht, Slatan Dudow		Weimar Republic	Agitprop film, written by Bertolt Brecht with music by Hanns Eisler.
Land of the Sun	Seymour Stern		United States	Experimental documentary
Little Geezer	Theodore Huff		United States	Genre parody
Ornament Sound Experiments	Oskar Fischinger		Weimar Republic	Synthetic sound experiments
Poem 8	Emlen Etting	Mary Binney Montgomery, Caresse Crosby	United States	Dance film, shot in 8mm, silent
Před maturitou (Before Matriculation)	Svatopluk Innemann, Vladislav Vančura	Jindřich Plachta, František Smolík	Czechoslovakia	Semi-experimental feature film
Qué vivá México!	Sergei Eisenstein, Grigori Alexandrov	Félix Balderas, Martín Hernández	Mexico	Begun in 1931, never completed by Eisenstein; edited into numerous other films
Studie(s) Nr. 10-11	Oskar Fischinger		Weimar Republic	Abstract animation
Studie Nr. 12	Oskar Fischinger, Hans Fischinger		Weimar Republic	Abstract animation
Sur les bords de la caméra (Pictures on the Sideline)	Henri Storck		Belgium	
Visions of Lourdes	Charles Dekeukeleire		Belgium	
1933
7 till 5	Norman McLaren		United Kingdom	Amateur city film
Dawn to Dawn	Josef Berne, Seymour Stern	Julie Haydon, Ole M. Ness, Frank Eklof	United States	a.k.a. "Black Dawn," short, Naturalist melodrama
Deserter	Vsevolod Pudovkin	Boris Livanov, Vasili Kovrigin	Soviet Union	Asynchronous use of sound and image
Drobiazg Melodyjny (Moment Musical)	Stefan Themerson, Franciszka Themerson		Poland	Rayographic animation, Lost
Footnote to Fact	Lewis Jacobs		United States	City film
G-3	Ralph Steiner		United States	Also dated to 1932
Las Hurdes: Tierra Sin Pan	Luis Buñuel	Abel Jacquin, Alexandre O'Neill	Spain	Documentary, co-written by Buñuel and Surrealist poet Pierre Unik, with music by Darius Milhaud
In the Icy Wastes of Dialectical Materialism	Luis Buñuel, Charles de Noailles		France	Re-edited section of L'age d'or, rendered as comedy and shown in leftist theaters in Eastern Europe; lost.
Lot in Sodom	James Sibley Watson Jr., Melville Webber	Friedrich Haak, Hildegarde Watson	United States	Experimental short based on Biblical story
Mr. Motorboat's Last Stand	John Flory, Theodore Huff	Leonard Stirrup	United States	Satire
On the Sunny Side	Vladislav Vančura	Filip Balek-Brodský, Hana Bečková	Czechoslovakia	Didactic feature film
Une nuit sur le mont chauve	Alexandre Alexieff, Claire Parker		France	First pinscreen animation, also dated to 1934, 1931
Oil—A Symphony in Motion	M.G. MacPherson (director), Jean D. Michelson (editor)		United States	Only extant Artkino production
Oramunde	Emlen Etting	Caresse Crosby, Mary Binney Montgomery	United States	Dance film
Poslovi konzula Dorgena (Consul Dorgen's Business)	Oktavijan Miletić	Šime Marov, Ivan Alpi-Rauch	Yugoslavia	Experimental dramatic short; won a prize awarded by Louis Lumière
Prostoy sluchay (A Simple Case)	Vsevolod Pudovkin	Aleksandr Baturin, Mariya Belousova	Soviet Union	Naturalist drama, begun in 1931; silent
Pueblo	Seymour Stern		United States	Experimental documentary; never finished, Lost film
Synchromy	Mary Ellen Bute, Lewis Jacobs, Joseph Schillinger		United States	Abstract animation, never completed
Tilly Losch in the Dance of Her Hands	Norman Bel Geddes	Tilly Losch	United States	Dance film, dated 1930–33
The Earth Sings	Karel Plicka, Alexandr Hackenschmied		Czechoslovakia	Experimentally edited ethnographic semi-documentary, with music score
Zéro de conduite	Jean Vigo		France	
1934
Atoms of Eternity	Čeněk Zahradníček		Czechoslovakia	
Beyond This Open Road	B. Vivian Braun		United Kingdom	
Café Universal	Ralph Steiner		United States	Satire featuring members of The Group Theatre
Camera Makes Whoopee	Norman McLaren		United Kingdom	Amateur film; montage experiments
La Joie de vivre	Anthony Gross, Hector Hoppin		France	Stylized, surreal animated film
The Furies	Slavko Vorkapich		United States	Surreal special effects insert for feature, "Crime without Passion"
Hands	Ralph Steiner, Willard Van Dyke		United States	Sponsored by the Works Project Administration; also dated 1936-7 and edited into later films
Happiness	Aleksandr Medvedkin	Petr Zinoviev, Elena Egorova	Soviet Union	Soviet satire; stylized, silent
The Hearts of Age	William Vance, Orson Welles	Virginia Nicolson, Orson Welles	United States	Amateur experimental film, made at the Todd School, Chicago
Kreise (Circles)	Oskar Fischinger		Weimar Republic	Abstract animation, exists in two versions, color
Liebesspiel	Oskar Fischinger		Nazi Germany	Abstract animation, first exhibited posthumously; silent
Man of Aran	Robert J. Flaherty		Ireland	Fictionalised documentary
Marijka nevěrnice (Faithless Maritza)	Vladislav Vančura	Hana Maria Pravda	Czechoslovakia	Semi-experimental feature
Muratti Greift Ein (Muratti Gets in the Act)	Oskar Fischinger		Nazi Germany	Dancing cigarette animation, Gasparcolor
Prisoner	Roman Freulich	George Sari, Jack Rockwell	United States	Expressionistic short, made in Hollywood, lost film
Quadrate (Squares)	Oskar Fischinger		Nazi Germany	Abstract animation, silent, Gasparcolor
Rhythm in Light	Mary Ellen Bute		United States	Abstract animation
Ein Spiel in Farben (A Play in Colors)	Oskar Fischinger		Nazi Germany	Abstract animation, a.k.a. Studie No. 11a, color
Studie Nr. 13 (Coriolan Fragment)	Oskar Fischinger		Nazi Germany	Abstract animation, unfinished
Sweet Land of Liberty	Leo Hurwitz		United States	Satirical documentary; Lost film
Žijeme v Praze (We Live in Prague)	Otakar Vávra		Czechoslovakia	City film
1935
A Colour Box	Len Lye		United Kingdom	
Colour Cocktail	Norman McLaren		United Kingdom	Abstract animation; lost film
Ghost Town: The Story of Fort Lee	Theodore Huff, Mark Borgatte		United States	Semi-documentary
Gypsy Night	Josef Berne, Harold Hecht		United States	Musical short, set in a Gypsy camp, color
The Hands on Tuesday	Čeněk Zahradníček		Czechoslovakia	
Hollywood	Vic Kandel, Robert Del Duca		United States	Satire, Lost film
Kinetic Molpai	Ted Shawn	Ted Shawn and his Men Dancers	United States	Modern dance film
Komposition in Blau (Composition in Blue)	Oskar Fischinger		Nazi Germany	Abstract animation in Gasparcolour
November	Otakar Vávra, Alexandr Hackenschmied		Czechoslovakia	
Muratti Privat	Oskar Fischinger		Nazi Germany	Dancing cigarette animation, black and white
Pie in the Sky	Ralph Steiner, Elia Kazan, Molly Day Thatcher, Irving Lerner	Elia Kazan, Russell Collins	United States	Satire
Pink Guards On Parade	Oskar Fischinger		Nazi Germany	Abstract advertisement, Gasparcolor, unfinished; recreation on video made in 2000 by William Moritz
Poison	Man Ray	Man Ray, Meret Oppenheim	France	Double "portrait" film of Ray and Oppenheim
Polychrome Phantasy	Norman McLaren		Canada	Abstract animation, color
Synchromy No. 2	Mary Ellen Bute, Ted Nemeth		United States	Abstract animation
Zwarcie (Short Circuit)	Stefan Themerson, Franciszka Themerson		Poland	Abstract animation, music by Witold Lutoslawski, Lost
1936
145 W 21	Rudy Burckhardt	Paul Bowles, Aaron Copland	United States	
The Birth of the Robot	Len Lye		United Kingdom	
Black and White Rhapsody	Martin Frič		Czechoslovakia	City film
Dada	Mary Ellen Bute, produced by Ted Nemeth		United States	Abstract animation, black and white
Hell Unlimited	Helen Biggar, Norman McLaren		United Kingdom	Anti-war political short
The New Architecture and the London Zoo	László Moholy-Nagy		United Kingdom	
Redes	Emilio Gómez Muriel, Fred Zinnemann	Silvio Hernández, Rafael Hinojosa	Mexico	Cinematography by Paul Strand, music by Silvestre Revueltas; Eisenstein-influenced revolutionary film
Rose Hobart	Joseph Cornell	Rose Hobart	United States	Collage film
1937
Even—As You and I	LeRoy Robbins, Harry Hay	Hy Hirsh	United States	
Escape	Mary Ellen Bute, produced by Ted Nemeth		United States	Abstract animation, color
Monsieur Fantômas	Ernst Moerman		Belgium	
An Optical Poem	Oskar Fischinger		United States	Abstract animation, distributed by MGM, color
Parabola	Mary Ellen Bute, Ted Nemeth, Bill Nemeth, Rutherford Boyd		United States	Abstract animation
Przygoda Czlowieka Poczciwego (The Adventure of a Good Citizen)	Stefan Themerson, Franciszka Themerson		Poland	Satire
Seeing the World No. 1: A Trip to New York CIty	Rudy Burckhardt		United States	City film
Silnice spívá (The Highway Sings)	Elmar Klos, Alexandr Hackenschmied		Czechoslovakia	Experimental advertising film
1938
Bookstalls	Joseph Cornell		United States	Collage film, title added posthumously; Silent
Carousel: Animal Opera	Joseph Cornell		United States	Collage film
The Children's Jury	Joseph Cornell		United States	Collage film, Silent
The Children's Trilogy: Cotillion, The Midnight Party, The Children's Party	Joseph Cornell		United States	Collage film, put into a final form by Larry Jordan ca. 1967–70, Silent
Family Film	José Val del Omar		Spain	
Fragment from Caroland's Mansion	Frank Stauffacher		United States	
Jack's Dream	Joseph Cornell		United States	Collage film, put into a final form by Larry Jordan ca. 1970
N or NW	Len Lye		United Kingdom	
Thimble Theater	Joseph Cornell		United States	Collage film, title added posthumously; Silent
Tree Trunk to Head	Lewis Jacobs	Chaim Gross	United States	Semi-documentary, silent
1939
The City	Ralph Steiner, Willard Van Dyke		United States	City film for New York World's Fair, written by Pare Lorentz
Dance of the Colors	Hans Fischinger		Germany	Abstract animation, color
Haiti	Rudy Burckhardt		United States	
Love on the Wing	Norman McLaren		United Kingdom	Abstract animation, color
Scherzo	Norman McLaren		United Kingdom	Abstract animation, color
Spare Time	Humphrey Jennings		United Kingdom	Short documentary about British people at leisure, inspired by Mass Observation
Spook Sport	Mary Ellen Bute, Ted Nemeth, Norman McLaren		United States	Abstract animation, color, animation by McLaren
Stars and Stripes	Norman McLaren		United Kingdom	Abstract animation, color
Time in the Sun	Marie Seton		United Kingdom	Composite film, made of footage shot by Sergei Eisenstein for Qué vivá México!

== Bibliography ==
- Jan Christopher Horak, ed. Lovers of Cinema: The First American Avant-Garde, University of Wisconsin Press, Madison WI 1995
  - Lovers of Cinema: The First American Avant-Garde, 1919–1945. University of Wisconsin Press, 1998. ISBN 978-0-299-14684-9
- Paul Rotha and Roger Manvell, "Movie Parade: A Pictorial Survey of the Cinema" London: The Studio, 1936
- Parker Tyler, "Underground Film: A Critical History" New York: Da Capo Press, 1995 (originally published in 1969)
- David Curtis, "Experimental Cinema" New York: Universe Books, 1970
- Bruce Posner, ed. Unseen Cinema: Early American Avant-Garde Film, Black Thistle Press/Anthology Film Archives, NYC 2001
