= List of LGBTQ-related films of the 1930s =

This is a list of lesbian, gay, bisexual, transgender or queer-related films released in the 1930s. It contains theatrically released films that deal with important gay, lesbian, bisexual, transgender or queer characters or issues and may have same-sex romance or relationships as a plot device.

== 1930s ==
Title	Year	Director	Country	Genre	Cast	Notes
Borderline	1930	Kenneth MacPherson	United Kingdom	Drama, avant-garde	Paul Robeson, Eslanda Goode Robeson (credited as Eslanda Robeson), H.D. (credited as Helga Doorn)	
Morocco	1930	Josef von Sternberg	United States	Drama	Gary Cooper, Marlene Dietrich, Adolphe Menjou, Ullrich Haupt, Francis McDonald, Eve Southern, Paul Porcasi	Based on the novel Amy Jolly by Benno Vigny
Sunny Skies	1930	Norman Taurog	United States	Comedy	Benny Rubin, Marceline Day, Rex Lease, Marjorie Lane, Harry Lee, Wesley Barry, Greta Granstedt, Robert Livingston (credited as Robert Randall), Eddy Chandler (credited as Eddie Chandler)	
Way Out West	1930	Fred Niblo	United States	Comedy, western	Stan Laurel, Oliver Hardy, Sharon Lynn (credited as Sharon Lynne), James Finlayson, Rosina Lawrence, Stanley Fields, Vivien Oakland, The Avalon Boys	
Mädchen in Uniform	1931	Leontine Sagan	Germany	Drama, romance	Hertha Thiele, Dorothea Wieck, Emilia Unda	Co-written by Christa Winsloe, based on her stage play Gestern und heute (Then and Now)
The Maltese Falcon	1931	Roy Del Ruth	United States	Crime	Bebe Daniels, Ricardo Cortez, Dudley Digges, Una Merkel, Robert Elliott, Thelma Todd, Otto Matieson, Walter Long, Dwight Frye, J. Farrell McDonald	Based on the novel of the same name by Dashiell Hammett
Manhattan Parade	1931	Lloyd Bacon	United States	Comedy	Winnie Lightner, Charles Butterworth	
The Public Enemy	1931	William A. Wellman	United States	Action, crime	James Cagney, Jean Harlow, Edward Woods, Joan Blondell	Based on the unpublished novel Beer and Blood by John Bright and Kubec Glasmon
The Blood of a Poet	1932	Jean Cocteau	France	Drama, fantasy	Enrique Riveros	a.k.a. Le sang d'un poète
The Old Dark House	1932	James Whale	United States	Horror	Boris Karloff (credited as KARLOFF), Melvyn Douglas, Raymond Massey, Gloria Stuart, Charles Laughton, Lilian Bond, Ernest Thesiger, Eva Moore, Brember Wills	Based on the novel Benighted by J. B. Priestley
Call Her Savage	1932	John Francis Dillon	United States	Drama	Clara Bow, Gilbert Roland, Thelma Todd, Monroe Owsley, Estelle Taylor, Weldon Heyburn, Willard Robertson	One of the first portrayals of a gay bar on screen
Hell's Highway	1932	Rowland Brown	United States	Drama	Richard Dix, Tom Brown, Rochelle Hudson, C. Henry Gordon, Oscar Apfel, Stanley Fields, John Arledge, Warner Richmond	
Diplomaniacs	1933	William A. Seiter	United States	Comedy	Bert Wheeler, Robert Woolsey, Marjorie White, Phyllis Barry, Louis Calhern, Hugh Herbert, Edgar Kennedy, Richard Carle, William Irving, Neely Edwards, Billy Bletcher	
Lot in Sodom	1933	James Sibley Watson, Melville Webber	United States	Drama	Friedrich Haak, Hildegarde Watson, Dorothea Haus, Lewis Whitbeck	
Ladies They Talk About	1933	Howard Bretherton, William Keighley	United States	Drama, romance	Barbara Stanwyck, Preston Foster, Lyle Talbot, Dorothy Burgess, Lillian Roth, Maude Eburne, Ruth Donnelly, Harold Huber, Robert McWade	Based on the play Women in Prison by Dorothy Mackaye and Carlton Miles
Myrt and Marge	1933	Al Boasberg	United States	Comedy	Myrtle Vail	
Our Betters	1933	George Cukor	United States	Comedy, drama, romance	Constance Bennett, Anita Louise, Gilbert Roland, Violet Kemble-Cooper, Charles Starrett, Grant Mitchell, Minor Watson, Hugh Sinclair, Alan Mowbray, Tyrell Davis	Based on the play of the same name by W. Somerset Maugham
Queen Christina	1933	Rouben Mamoulian	United States	Drama, biography	Greta Garbo, John Gilbert, Ian Keith, Lewis Stone	
Stage Mother	1933	Charles Brabin	United States	Drama, musical, romance	Alice Brady, Maureen O'Sullivan, Franchot Tone, Phillips Holmes, Ted Healy, Russell Hardie, C. Henry Gordon, Alan Edwards, Ben Alexander, Jay Eaton, Larry Fine	Based on the novel of the same name by Bradford Ropes
Zero for Conduct	1933	Jean Vigo	France	Short, comedy, drama		a.k.a. Zéro de conduite: Jeunes diables au collège
Victor and Victoria	1933	Reinhold Schünzel	Germany	Musical, comedy	Renate Müller, Hermann Thimig, Anton Walbrook, Hilde Hildebrand, Fritz Odemar, Friedel Pisetta, Aribert Wäscher	a.k.a. Viktor und Viktoria
Wonder Bar	1934	Lloyd Bacon	United States	Musical, crime, drama	Al Jolson, Kay Francis	
An Actor's Revenge	1935	Teinosuke Kinugasa	Japan	Drama	Kazuo Hasegawa, Naoe Fushimi, Akiko Chihaya, Yoshito Yamaji, Tokusaburo Arashi, Kokuten Kōdō	Based on the novel by Otokichi Mikami
First a Girl	1935	Victor Saville	United Kingdom	Musical, comedy	Jessie Matthews, Sonnie Hale, Anna Lee, Griffth Jones, Alfred Drayton	An English version of Viktor und Viktoria
Sylvia Scarlett	1935	George Cukor	United States	Comedy, drama, romance	Katharine Hepburn, Cary Grant, Brian Aherne, Edmund Gwenn, Dennie Moore	Based on the novel The Early Life of Sylvia Scarlett by Compton Mackenzie
Top Hat	1935	Mark Sandrich	United States	Comedy, musical, romance	Fred Astaire, Ginger Rogers, Edward Everett Horton, Erik Rhodes, Helen Broderick, Eric Blore	
Dracula's Daughter	1936	Lambert Hillyer	United States	Drama, fantasy, horror	Otto Kruger, Gloria Holden, Marguerite Churchill, Irving Pichel, Gilbert Emery, Edward Van Sloan, Halliwell Hobbes, Billy Bevan, Nan Grey, Hedda Hopper, Claud Allister, Edgar Norton, E. E. Clive	
La Garçonne	1936	Jean de Limur	France	Drama	Marie Bell, Arletty, Henri Rollan, Maurice Escande, Jaque Catelain, Pierre Etchepare, Philippe Hersent, Jean Worms, Marcelle Praince, Vanda Gréville, Suzy Solidor, Édith Piaf, Jean Tissier, Marcelle Géniat, Junie Astor, Jane Marken	a.k.a. The Bachelor Girl; based on the novel of the same name by Victor Margueritte
Rangle River	1936	Clarence G. Badger	Australia	Action, adventure, mystery	Victor Jory, Robert Coote	Based on a story by Zane Grey
Women's Club	1936	Jacques Deval	France	Comedy, drama	Danielle Darrieux, Josette Day, Betty Stockfeld, Ève Francis, Junie Astor, Valentine Tessier	a.k.a. Club de Femmes
Lady Killer	1937	Jean Grémillon	France; Germany	Drama, romance, war	Jean Gabin, Mireille Balin, Pierre Etchepare, Henri Poupon, Jean Aymé, Pierre Magnier, Marguerite Deval, René Lefèvre, Jane Marken (credited as Jeanne Markin), Paulette Noizeux, André Siméon (credited as Siméon), Pierre Labry, Lucien Dayle, Louis Florencie (credited as Florencie), Paul Fournier, André Carnège, Maurice Baquet, Frédéric Mariotti (credited as Mariotti)	a.k.a. Gueule d'amour
Stage Door	1937	Gregory La Cava	United States	Comedy, drama	Katharine Hepburn, Ginger Rogers, Adolphe Menjou, Gail Patrick, Andrea Leeds, Constance Collier, Lucille Ball, Eve Arden, Ann Miller, Franklin Pangborn	Adapted from a play of the same name by Edna Ferber and George S. Kaufman
Hôtel du Nord	1938	Marcel Carné	France	Drama	Annabella, Jean-Pierre Aumont, Louis Jouvet, Arletty, Paulette Dubost, Andrex, André Brunot, Henri Bosc, Marcel André, Bernard Blier, Jacques Louvigny, Armand Lurville (credited as Lurville), Jane Marken, Génia Vaury, François Périer, René Bergeron	
