= Robert Glasgow =

Robert Ellison Glasgow (May 30, 1925 – September 10, 2008) was an American organist and music pedagogue. He taught at the University of Michigan for over 40 years and was an internationally respected performer.

Glasgow studied at the Eastman School of Music with Harold Gleason and Catharine Crozier, receiving both his bachelor's and his master's degrees there. He taught at MacMurray College for eleven years, then became Professor of Music (organ) at the University of Michigan-Ann Arbor in 1962, serving on the faculty until his retirement in 2005. MacMurray College named him an honorary doctor of music, and the University of Michigan School of Music honored him with the Harold Haugh Award for excellence in the teaching of performance.

During his life, he gave concert tours through Europe several times, toured the United States and Canada every season, and was in demand for master classes and workshops. Annually, he appeared as a featured performer, lecturer and clinician at national and regional conventions of the American Guild of Organists. He gave a recital, a lecture, and a master class at the International Congress of Organists at Cambridge University, and was a featured recitalist and lecturer at the American Classic Organ Symposium in the Mormon Tabernacle, marking the renovation of its historic organ. He recorded the organ works of César Franck for Prestant Records.

Glasgow was named International Performer of the Year in 1997 by the American Guild of Organists.
