= Emily Sibley Watson =

American philanthropist (1855–1945)

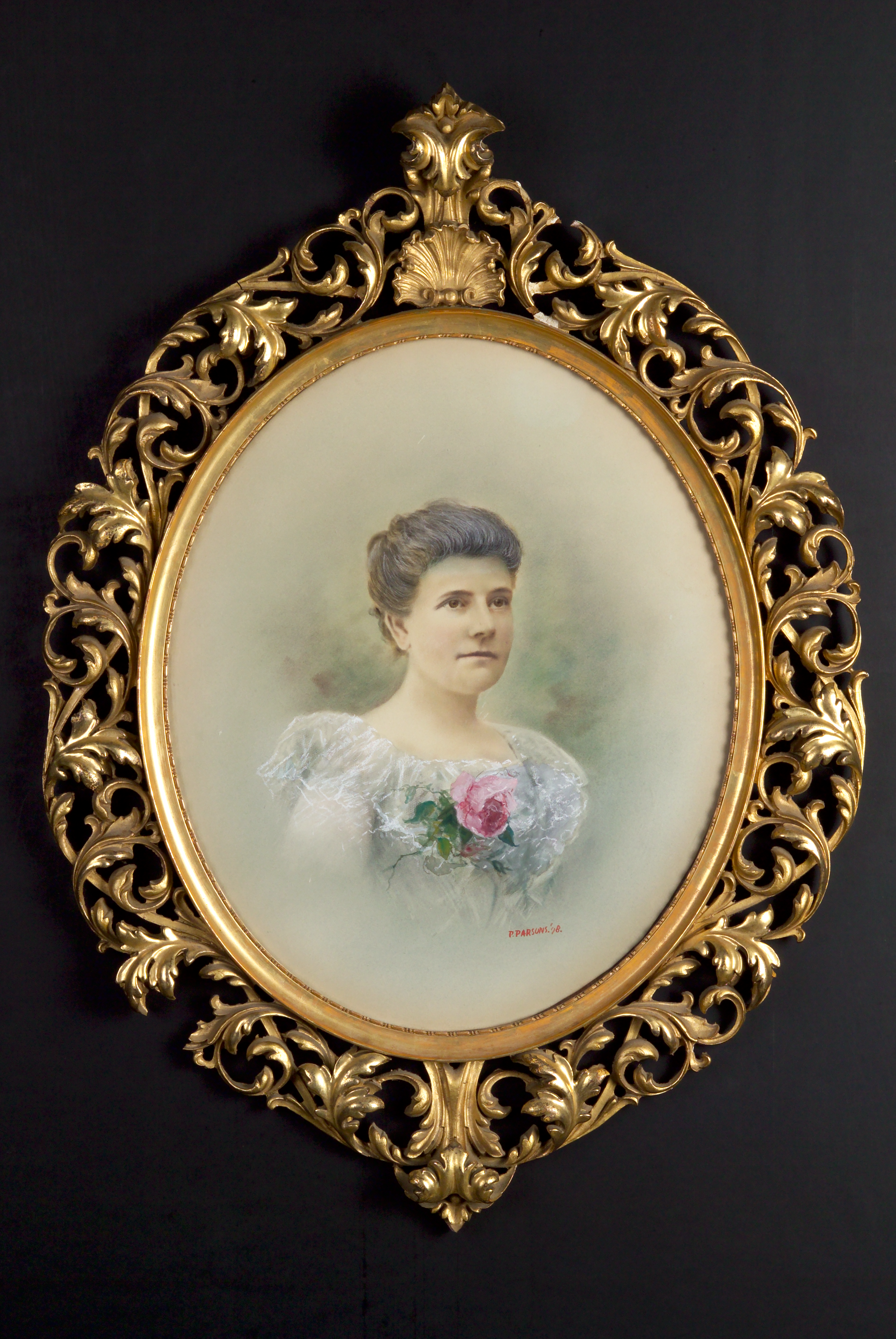
- Hand-colored photograph of Emily Sibley Watson, by P. Parsons, ca. 1878
- Born: Emily Sibley; May 10, 1855; Rochester, New York, U.S.
- Died: February 8, 1945 (aged 89); Rochester, New York, U.S.
- Resting place: Mount Hope Cemetery (Rochester)
- Occupation: Philanthropist
- Spouses: Isaac S. Averell (m. 1876; div. 1891) James Sibley Watson (m. 1891)
- Children: 3, including James Sibley Watson Jr.
- Father: Hiram Sibley

Emily Sibley Watson (née Sibley; May 10, 1855 – February 8, 1945) was a Rochester, New York philanthropist and patron of the arts. Youngest child of Western Union founder Hiram Sibley and Elizabeth Tinker Sibley, she grew up in a family that valued service, faith, and the arts. She is best known as the founder of the Memorial Art Gallery of the University of Rochester, and patron of Rochester's Hochstein School of Music & Dance. With her mother, she was a major supporter of the Homeopathic Hospital (later Genesee Hospital).

== Early life and education ==
Hiram Sibley's youngest child, Emily Sibley, was born within a few years of the founding of her father's most famous endeavor, Western Union. The financial success of the company created stupendous wealth for him and for many other Rochesterians.

While little is known about Emily Sibley's early education, early opportunities for travel contributed to her interest in art and culture.

In 1864-1866, Hiram Sibley traveled through Europe, in part to negotiate with the Czar of Russia to run a telegraph line across the Bering Strait from Alaska to Russia, taking his wife and daughter with him to join his son, Hiram Watson Sibley, who was already studying abroad. Emily's schooling and travels during this period were documented in a diary, now in the collection of the Memorial Art Gallery Archives. She records visits to museums and picture galleries, concerts, and parades. She was a boarding school student in Paris before the family returned to Rochester in 1866.

By 1871, Emily Sibley was in boarding school in New York.

== Family life and travels ==
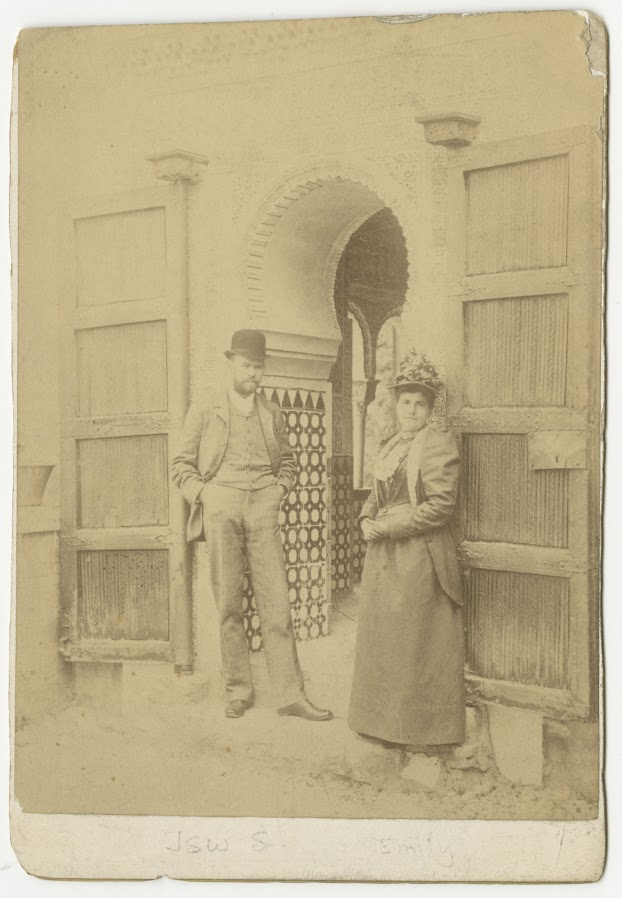
Emily and James Sibley Watson at the entrance to the mosque in the Alhambra, Granada, Spain, June 2, 1891

Emily Sibley's 1875 diary documents meeting her future husband, Isaac Seymour Averell (Ike), member of a prominent Ogdensburg, New York family. They were married on April 27, 1876, and traveled to France to begin married life. Their daughter Elizabeth Louise was born in Nice, France, on January 25, 1877. At some point in the year, the Averell family returned to Rochester, and her son James George (called J.G.) was born on December 23, 1877.

By early 1878, Ike Averell bought out the previous shareholders of the Bank of Monroe, and became president, with Hiram Sibley on the board of directors. By May 1880, financial problems had started to emerge, problems which continued for several years. While not reported until after his death, in July 1883 Hiram Sibley added a codicil to his will ensuring that Ike would have no access to Sibley family funds at any time in the future. Less than a week after signing the codicil, Hiram & Elizabeth Sibley, and Emily Sibley Averell and her two children departed for a lengthy stay in Europe. By the time the family returned in June 1884, Isaac Averell was no longer residing in Rochester and was listed in the Alameda, California city directory.

Upon her return to Rochester, Emily Sibley Averell moved into a new home around the corner from her parents at 11 Prince Street. Within two years, diphtheria claimed the life of young Louise, age 9.

Separated from her husband, a friendship blossomed between Emily Sibley Averell and James Sibley Watson, son of her father's partner, Don Alonzo Watson. "Jimmie" and his sister Belle likely met up with Emily and her family in Europe in 1883, and did return with them on the SS Oregon on June 16, 1884. By 1885, James Watson was writing Emily regularly whenever he was out of town on hunting trips. He also was part of an extended Sibley family trip to Yellowstone in 1889.

In Fall 1890, Emily Sibley Averell spent several months in Santa Barbara, California, establishing residency in order to divorce Isaac Averell. On January 5, 1891, the Democrat and Chronicle reported that "Emily S. Averill [sic] has instituted an action for divorce against Isaac Averill." Emily Sibley Averell and James Sibley Watson were married on April 6, 1891.

Emily and Jimmie traveled to Spain and Morocco for their honeymoon, and in 1892-1893, the family traveled to Egypt. In fall 1893, Emily's son J.G. Averell enrolled as a student at Saint Paul's School in Concord, New Hampshire, and the next summer, a son, James Sibley Watson, Jr. (called Sibley), was born to Emily and Jimmie on August 10, 1894.

Subsequent family travels were documented in James Sibley Watson, Jr.'s "Baby Book," in which Emily Sibley Watson documented annual trips at the time of Sibley's birthday.

== Philanthropy ==
Watson was raised in a philanthropic environment. Her mother, Elizabeth Tinker Sibley, supported churches in her home town of North Adams, Massachusetts, Sibley, Illinois, as well as Rochester, New York, and was the founder of one of Rochester's early homeopathic hospitals.

=== Homeopathic hospital ===
Beginning in the late 1880s, Emily Sibley Averell participated with other family members in the support of the Homeopathic Hospital (later the now-defunct Genesee Hospital). Both the Sibley and Watson families, including Emily's soon-to-be husband, James Sibley Watson, were active supporters. Emily Sibley Watson's children from both her first and second marriage were involved in fundraising. In 1898, Watson donated a new maternity ward to the hospital.

=== Fine arts ===
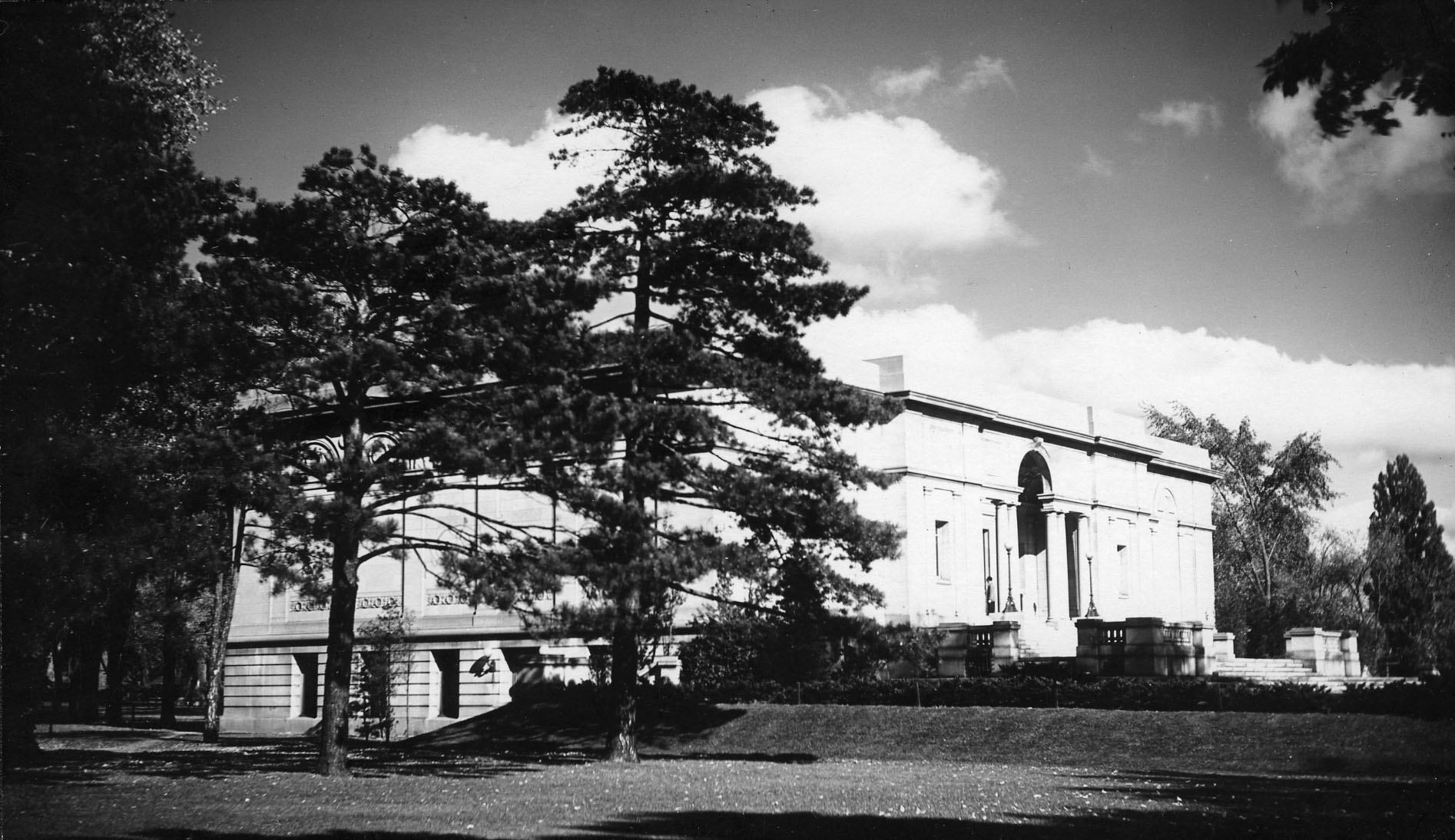
Memorial Art Gallery, 1913

Watson's art collection began after her first marriage and continued throughout her life. In 1881, she became actively involved in the Rochester Ladies Art Exchange (organized in 1879), a charitable organization that fostered the interests of art in the community through exhibitions, sales and art classes, particularly focusing on the work of local craftswomen and artists. She loaned works from her personal collection to the Art Exchange's 1881 Loan Exhibition. She was one of the Art Exchange's managers as early as 1883.

Beginning in 1886, the Art Exchange began to host exhibitions in partnership with the Rochester Art Club. Throughout the 1890s, Watson supported local artists, purchasing art from exhibitions of the Art Club as early as 1893 (ledger of Art purchases, Memorial Art Gallery archives). After the 1877 closing of the Powers Art Gallery and the 1899 auction of Daniel W. Powers' art collection in New York City, the Rochester Art Club increased its campaign for a public art museum in Rochester. By 1903, the Art Club began to solicit art for such a museum, receiving donations from local and nationally-known artists and collectors. While the Art Club continued its annual exhibitions and continued to report progress on creating a Fine Arts Museum for Rochester, other individuals and groups would ultimately be successful in fulfilling the Art Club's vision.

Watson's son J.G. Averell was a budding architect and active amateur sportsman when he died of typhoid at age 26 in 1904. Given her family's history of donating memorials in the name of deceased family members, it is likely that Watson was soon considering how she might best commemorate her son. University of Rochester president Rush Rhees had been thinking about an art museum on campus as early as 1905. Watson's donation of the Memorial Art Gallery to the University of Rochester was publicly announced on April 22, 1912.

A New York City architect, and Watson's nephew by marriage, John Allyne Gade of the firm Foster, Gade, and Graham, designed the Renaissance Revival structure, modeling some of its details after the Malatesta Temple in Rimini, Italy. J.G. Averell had visited Rimini the summer before he died and made measured drawings of the building.

From its opening on October 8, 1913 to her death in 1945, Watson and her husband were dedicated supporters of the Memorial Art Gallery. They funded an addition to the 1913 building in 1926, made up shortfalls in the Gallery's budget in the years before it had significant endowments, and donated generously from their personal collection as well as purchasing art out of exhibitions. More than 500 objects from Emily and James Sibley Watson, with additions from subsequent family generations, are part of the collection of the Memorial Art Gallery.

=== Music ===
Paralleling her interest and involvement with the visual arts was Watson's love of music, which she shared with her family. Watson's brother, Hiram Watson Sibley, founded Rochester's outstanding Sibley Music Library in 1904. Watson's son, J.G. Averell, studied violin under the tutelage of Hermann Dossenbach, and Watson supported Dossenbach's European travels.

Of all the people whom Watson took under her wing, David Hochstein was the best known. A musical prodigy born to Jewish immigrants who arrived from Russia as part of the great wave of Eastern European migration in the late nineteenth century, Hochstein was becoming known to the musical community in the years that overlapped with Emily's son J.G.'s death. Along with George Eastman, Emily Sibley Watson supported young Hochstein's violin studies abroad. After his death in World War I, Emily Sibley Watson purchased the Hochstein family home so that it could be used to create the settlement school that became the Hochstein School of Music & Dance.

For her gifts to music, Watson was elected a charter member of the Rochester Music Hall of Fame.

== Death and burial ==
Watson died in her home on Prince Street on February 8, 1945. She is interred in Mount Hope Cemetery in Rochester, NY. Her tombstone and the Watson family monument were designed by local architect Claude Fayette Bragdon.
