= George Eastman Museum Motion Picture Collection =

Museum in Rochester, New York, United States

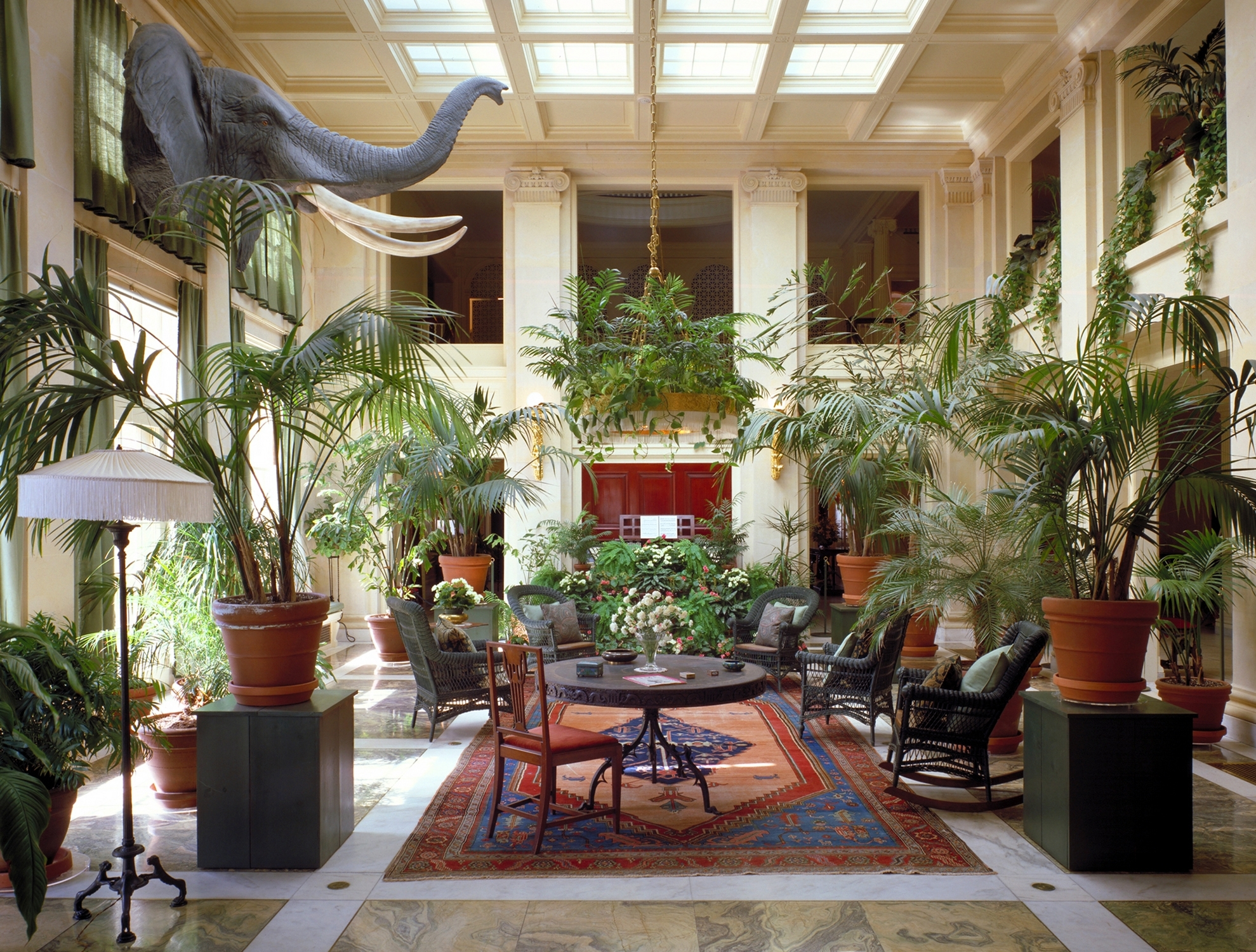
Interior of George Eastman's mansion at the George Eastman Museum

The George Eastman Museum Motion Picture Collection in Rochester, New York comprises about 28,000 titles, including features, shorts, documentaries, newsreels, and experimental moving images. The collection is renowned for its holdings of silent films. The George Eastman Museum owns the Louis B. Mayer Conservation Center, where its holdings of nitrate films are stored. In 1996, the Eastman Museum founded the L. Jeffrey Selznick School of Film Preservation.

== Notable films in the collection ==
- The Voice of the Violin (1909)
- The Ranger's Bride (1910)
- The Colleen Bawn (1911)
- Fighting Blood (1911)
- A Western Girl (1911)
- The Scarlet Letter (1913)
- The Struggle (1913)
- The Golden Chance (1915)
- The Professor's Painless Cure (1915)
- American Aristocracy (1916)
- The Chalk Line (1916)
- Manhattan Madness (1916)
- The Social Secretary (1916)
- The Upheaval (1916)
- The Call of Her People (1917)
- A Daughter of the Poor (1917)
- The Blue Bird (1918)
- Humdrum Brown (1918)
- Opportunity (1918)
- The Tip (1918)
- The Man in the Moonlight (1919)
- The Virtuous Model (1919)
- Paris Green (1920)
- The Penalty (1920)
- Sowing the Wind (1921)
- Stronger Than Death (1920)
- The Willow Tree (1920)
- The Ace of Hearts (1921)
- Kindred of the Dust (1922)
- The Light in the Dark (1922)
- Sherlock Holmes (1922)
- Turn to the Right (1922)
- A Virgin's Sacrifice (1922)
- Eugene O'Neill and John Held in Bermuda (1925)
- The Phantom of the Opera (1925/1929)
- The Girl from Montmartre (1926)
- The Battle of the Sexes (1928)
- Skyscraper Symphony (1929)
- Eyes of Science (1930)
- Tomato's Another Day/It Never Happened (1930)
- Alba Novella e Ralph Pedi Cantando il Canzoni il Gondoliere ed it Tango Della Gelosia (1935)
- Kahlo and Rivera (1935)
- Highlights and Shadows (1938)
- Too Much Johnson (1938)
- Joan Crawford Home Movies (1940-41/1950s)
- Fear and Desire (1953)
