= David Hochstein =

American violinist

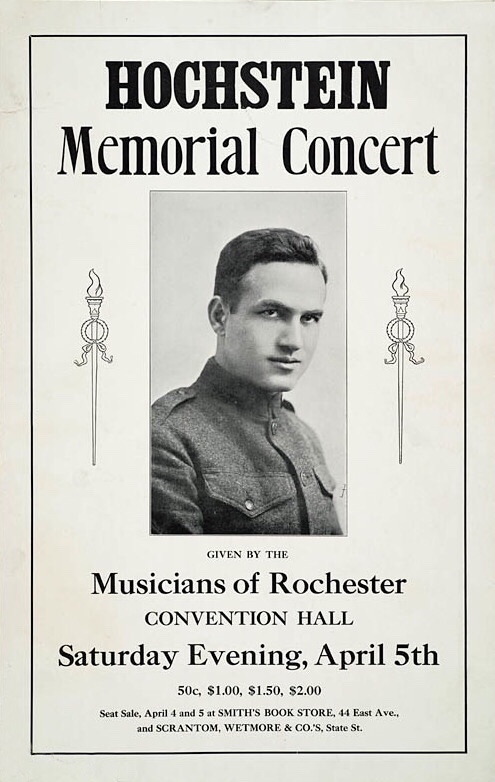
- A poster with an image of David Hochstein in military uniform.

Background information
- Born: February 16, 1892; Rochester, New York, United States
- Died: October 12, 1918 (aged 26) Forest of Argonne, France
- Genres: Classical
- Instrument: Violin

David Hochstein (February 16, 1892 – October 12, 1918) was an American virtuoso violinist from Rochester, New York. After enlisting in the United States Army during World War I, he was killed during the Meuse-Argonne Offensive. In his honor, a music school was started in Rochester, and it now bears the name Hochstein School of Music & Dance.

== Biography ==
Helena Zodokoff and Jacob Hochstein were both Russian Jews who had fled their home country; they met for the first time in Rochester. Jacob was said to be fluent in six languages. Helena, born in 1860, was the elder half-sister of future anarchist Emma Goldman, with whom she arrived in Rochester on January 1, 1886, joining their sister Lena and her husband.

Jacob and Helena were married in 1888. Their son David, born in 1892, demonstrated an aptitude for music from infancy, according to his father. For his fifth birthday, David received his first violin, a gift from his father, who became the boy's first instructor.

Around 1902, David Hochstein was playing his violin at the home of a friend, the future superintendent of New York State Police John Adams Warner, son of the architect J. Foster Warner. Emily Sibley Watson, a patron of the arts, lived next door to the Warners and heard Hochstein's playing. Watson, who was the daughter of Western Union president Hiram Sibley, recognized Hochstein's talent and took it upon herself to fund his further education both at home and abroad.

With Watson as benefactor, Hochstein studied under Otakar Ševčík in Vienna and later Leopold Auer in Saint Petersburg. By 1914, Watson had prevailed upon George Eastman, the photography magnate who was Rochester's most influential philanthropist and artistic patron, to loan a pair of violins to Hochstein. One of the violins was a 1715 Stradivarius; the other was a 1760 Landolfi. Hochstein began playing across the United States and Europe, making his Carnegie Hall debut in 1915. By this time, it was clear Hochstein was a rising star and destined for greatness. He made his only recordings for Emerson Records in early 1917, of Fritz Kreisler's "Liebesleid", Cesar Cui's "Orientale", and his own arrangement of a waltz in A major by Johannes Brahms.

By the time World War I began, Jacob Hochstein had died, and David was the sole support for his mother. His aunt, Goldman, warned him away from enlisting in the military, but Hochstein was torn. He was no fan of the war, but he felt a responsibility to his country and some guilt about using his talents to avoid making the same sacrifices as his peers. He initially received a hardship exemption from military service, due to his mother being widowed, but thought better of it and had the exemption rescinded. He joined the United States Army in October 1917 and specifically requested assignment to a combat unit.

Nonetheless, he continued playing while he was in the service. The last time Hochstein played the Stradivarius was March 8, 1918, at a recital attended by Margaret Woodrow Wilson, daughter of the President, at Camp Upton on Long Island. The next day, during a trip by the Camp's vaudeville troupe to Rockville Center, the bus carrying the troupe broke down and crashed. There were no injuries, but the violin ended up in pieces. Hochstein returned to Rochester with the violin, where Eastman apparently arranged for its repair; the violin has been recorded as in the possession of John Friedrich & Brothers in New York City by 1919, and since 1959 as in the ownership of virtuoso Steven Staryk.

Hochstein was killed in October 1918 in the Forest of Argonne, a casualty of the Meuse-Argonne Offensive in France, the last major Allied offensive of the war. Helena Hochstein died within the year.

== Legacy ==
Reportedly, before leaving for war, Hochstein had expressed a desire to sponsor an effort to educate the underprivileged of Rochester in the musical arts, in such a way that cost to the students and their families would not be an obstacle. In Hochstein's memory, then, Emily Sibley Watson and George Eastman, with support from others, undertook to create a lasting memorial. Two benefit concerts were held in 1919, and Watson purchased the vacant Hochstein home, which then became the locus of the David Hochstein Music School Settlement.

The school, with a sliding tuition scale based on a family's ability to pay, admitted its first students in February 1920. The first director of the school was Harold Gleason, Eastman's personal organist. The school quickly joined the forefront of community music education in the United States, a burgeoning movement that took off in the postwar years.

Today, the school, now called the Hochstein School of Music & Dance, still teaches music to members of the Rochester community, and still offers tuition assistance to avoid turning anyone away. The school outgrew its quarters twice and now resides on Plymouth Avenue in downtown Rochester. Notable alumni include bandleader Mitch Miller and Broadway actress Donna Lynne Champlin.
