= Hildegarde Lasell Watson =

American actress (1888–1976)

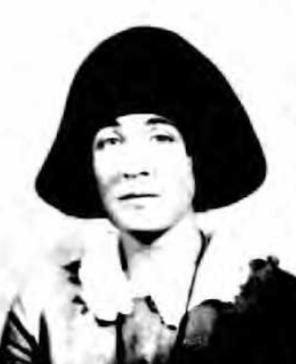
- Hildegarde Lasell Watson's U.S. passport photo, from 1921
- Born: December 28, 1888; Whitinsville, Massachusetts
- Died: September 26, 1976 (aged 87); Rochester, New York
- Occupations: Actress, singer, writer
- Spouse: James Sibley Watson
- Relatives: Emily Sibley Watson (mother-in-law)

Hildegarde Lasell Watson (December 28, 1888 – September 26, 1976) was an American actress, singer, writer and arts patron.

== Early life ==
Hildegarde Lasell was born in Whitinsville, Massachusetts, the daughter of Chester Whitin Lasell and Jessie Maude Keeler Lasell. She went to Florence to study art as a young woman.

== Career ==
Hildegarde Lasell was a concert singer. "Miss Lasell sang with refinement and cultivation," commented a reviewer in 1936, "she is obviously a serious student of the meaning and values of the music she interprets." She appeared in her husband's two short avant-garde films. She played Madeline Usher in the silent horror film The Fall of the House of Usher (1928) and Lot's wife in the Biblical adaptation Lot in Sodom (1933). In the 1950s, she persuaded composer Alec Wilder to write an original soundtrack for the 1928 film.

Watson was vice-president of the Rochester Historical Society, and wrote the history of the society's Woodside mansion in 1962. She received a medal from the Rochester Museum and Science Center in 1972, alongside fellow recipients including Robert Jastrow, Roger Tory Peterson, and Yousuf Karsh. Her memoir, The Edge of the Woods: A Memoir (1979), published posthumously. Some of her correspondence with poet Marianne Moore was also published posthumously.

== Personal life and legacy ==
Hildegarde Lasell married filmmaker, radiologist, and literary editor James Sibley Watson Jr. in 1916. Poet E. E. Cummings was an usher at their wedding. They had two children, Michael (1918–2012), who became a scientist and musician, and Jeanne (1921–1991). Hildegarde Lasell Watson died in 1976, at a hospital in Rochester, New York.

Her widower donated some of her art collection to The College at Brockport, State University College of New York. Objects and photographs related to Watson are in the collections of the Rosenbach Museum and Library in Philadelphia, the George Eastman Museum, Yale University, the New York Public Library, and other institutions. A painted portrait of Hildegarde Lasell as a girl, from 1902, is in the National Portrait Gallery. A 1925 statue of Watson by Gaston Lachaise is in the collection of the Memorial Art Gallery in Rochester, which was founded by her mother-in-law, Emily Sibley Watson; the Memorial Art Gallery also maintains the Sibley Watson Digital Archive.
