= Lot in Sodom =

1933 film by James Sibley Watson

- Title card
- Directed by: James Sibley Watson; Melville Webber
- Written by: Melville Webber
- Produced by: James Sibley Watson; Melville Webber; Bernard O'Brien; Alec Wilder; Remsen Wood
- Cinematography: James Sibley Watson
- Edited by: James Sibley Watson
- Music by: Louis Siegel
- Distributed by: DuWorld Pictures
- Release date: December 25, 1933; (Little Carnegie Theater)
- Running time: 28 minutes
- Country: United States

Lot in Sodom is a 1933 short silent and experimental film directed by James Sibley Watson and Melville Webber. The film stars Friedrich Haak, Hildegarde Watson, Dorothea Haus and Lewis Whitbeck.

The premise of the film is loosely based on the nineteenth chapter of Genesis, the biblical tale of the cities of Sodom and Gomorrah. The film deals with themes of gay male desire and heteronormative prohibition, and uses quotes from the Bible for the intertitles. It was the first American film made on the subject of Sodom and Gomorrah, and is considered part of the first American avant-garde cinema.

== Plot ==
Sodom is a place of sin. An angel appears there, and he is welcomed by Lot. The people of Sodom want to have sex with him. Lot refuses; then the angel tells him to escape the city with his wife and daughter. Sodom is destroyed by flames; Lot's wife is turned to a pillar of salt for having looked back.

In the biblical story, there are two Angels, and Lot has two daughters. In our film, for reasons of economy, there are only one Angel and one daughter, played respectively by Lewis Whitbeck, Jr., and Dorothea Haus.

— James Sibley Watson

== Cast ==
- Friedrich Haak as Lot
- Hildegarde Watson as Lot's wife
- Dorothea Haus as Lot's daughter
- Lewis Whitbeck as the angel

== Production ==
Lot in Sodom is based on the biblical tale of the cities of Sodom and Gomorrah. It was directed by James Sibley Watson and Melville Webber. (Note: Webber was an art historian and poet. His collaboration with Watson began in 1926 during his tenure as associate director of the Memorial Art Gallery in Rochester, New York, where he also taught art history and painting at the University of Rochester.) The movie uses experimental techniques, avant-garde imagery and strong allusions to sexuality, especially homosexuality. According to Watson, his duties on the film entailed the lighting, filming, developing, printing, splicing and projecting, while Weber was responsible for the screenplay, scene painting, costumes, makeup and ideas.

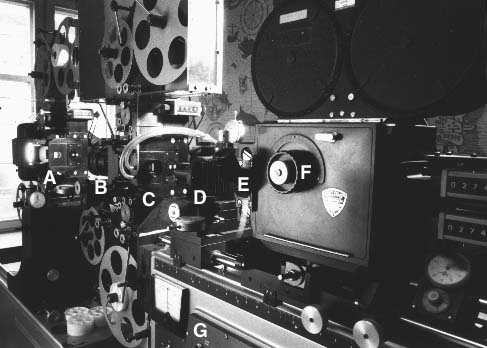
35mm optical printer

The film was shot in Watson's Prince Street studio using a homemade optical printer. According to Watson, the optical printer enabled them "to make changes in a scene after it had been shot." He went on to state that "run-ups and pull-backs made with the printer are nearly as good as those made by moving the camera", and if there were any errors, they could easily be fixed without having to reshoot the scene. Several of the transition shots in the film, like the fades and dissolves, along with the split-screen effects were put in with the printer.

Remsen Wood and Alec Wilder, who are listed as producers on the film only by their last names, also helped in the production of the film. Wood was instrumental in obtaining a sound on film recorder, from his friends at Kodak Park, and helped in making sure the optical printer was working. In addition, he assisted Melville with synchronizing the film with its sound track. Wilder was primarily responsible for the recruitment of the actors, and directed some of the scenes in the film that "depended on facial expression", since, according to Watson, "he knew how to coax exactly the right expression from the performers."

Louis Siegel composed and conducted the musical score, which was performed by students at the nearby Eastman School of Music, in Rochester, New York. A young Mitch Miller played oboe on the soundtrack.

== Release ==
The film premiered at the Little Carnegie Theatre in New York, on December 25, 1933, on a double bill with Josef Berne's short film Dawn to Dawn. It continued to play in theaters throughout the 1930s and 1940s, becoming in the process the most commercially successful avant-garde film of the era. In Sweden, the Statens biografbyrå prohibited the film from being screened in public, due to it being "contrary to law or morality". However, there was a loophole in the law that allowed the film, and other prohibited films, to be screened in private, mainly at student film clubs.

=== Home media ===
The film was released to DVD in 2003 by David Shepard's Blackhawk Films, along with the 1923 American silent drama film Salomé, directed by Charles Bryant. DVD Talk remarked that "both films are in remarkable shape, with the expected occasional light scratches, but still playing smoothly on the screen. Shepard uses freeze frames for the titles, but otherwise there's no sign of editorial tampering." Lori K. Martin and Norman G. Weinberg provide the liner and insert notes.

== Reception ==
James Shelley Hamilton of National Board of Review Magazine wrote "the course of events is not hard to follow, and upon the plot action is built a structure of pictorial overtones, that, through the eye, works upon the senses with an effect like of symphonic music, adding immensely to the emotional values implicit in the action; the picture is beyond argument one of the most important creations of the American cinema." The Austin Film Society stated "there is no doubt that Watson and his collaborators find the moral abandon of Sodom, with its writhing orgies of shirtless young men, much more compelling than the righteousness of the long-suffering Lot; the influence of Jean Cocteau's The Blood of a Poet seems apparent here."

Sam Staggs from The Gay & Lesbian Review Worldwide observed "this fey and affected visual poem — a minor epic of sorts, although for its makers more endgame than forecast — has gained cult status in recent years; this collaboration, self-consciously 'artistic', exceeds much Hollywood product of the time in technical virtuosity; and it's certainly more daring, with male and female nudity that even pre-Code studio pictures wouldn't risk; this subversive little film not only glamorizes the Sodomites, it also doesn't kiss anyone's holy book."

Film critic Lewis Jacobs gave it a glowing review stating, "the directors avoided literal statement and relied upon a rhythmical arrangement of symbols rather than chronological reconstruction of events; it drew upon all the means of camera, lenses, multiple exposure, distortions, dissolves, and editing to achieve a beauty of mobile images, of dazzling light and shade, of melting rhythms, with an intensity of feeling that approached poetry." He went on to opine that "its brilliant array of diaphanous shots and scenes were so smoothly synthesized on the screen that the elements of each composition seemed to melt and flow into one another with extraordinary iridescence."

Norman Wilson from Cinema Quarterly commented that "if their film is no more than a self-conscious preening of feathers before spreading the wings for flight, it must be welcomed as an attempt at experiment, even though we deplore the choice of theme and the decadent artiness of its treatment; as an achievement in film poetics, it is scarcely a milestone, but it is at least a signpost to a road which independent producers might profitably explore." Movie Makers, the official publication of the Amateur Cinema League, nominated the film as one of their ten best films of 1933, stating it "represents a complete innovation, not only in the treatment of the theme as a whole, but in the cinematic interpretation of the sequences."

== Legacy ==
It was the first American film made on the subject of Sodom and Gomorrah, and is considered part of the first American avant-garde cinema. The seventh studio album by English industrial metal band Godflesh, A World Lit Only by Fire, features cover art taken from the experimental film.

It also played a "significant role" in American filmmaker Barbara Hammer's 1992 experimental documentary film, Nitrate Kisses. Hammer recalled that:

In 1990, while researching Dr. James Sibley Watson's archive at the George Eastman House in Rochester, New York, I became aware of the large number of 35mm nitrate outtakes from Lot in Sodom. This extraordinary film by Watson and his gay colleague and co-director, Melville Webber, is one of the earliest queer films made in the united States. Its subtext of beautiful nude male bodies made celebratory overwhelmed the Biblical myth of the punishment allotted the men of Sodom. Though this story is well known, scholars now believe it actually told a fable of rape and violence rather than sodomy. I wanted to tell it as a contemporary tale of gay pride.

== See also ==
- Sodom und Gomorrha (1922 film)
- Sodom and Gomorrah (1963 film)
- List of avant-garde films of the 1930s
