= The Fall of the House of Usher (1928 American film) =

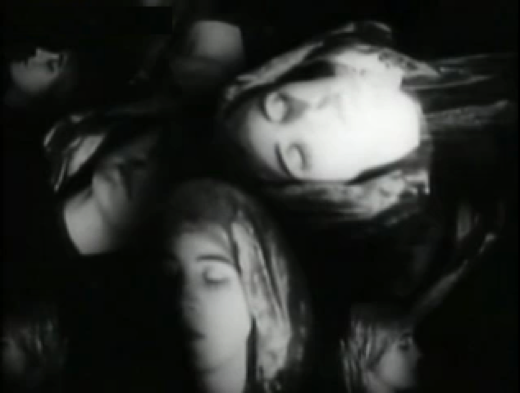
- A scene from the short film
- Directed by: James Sibley Watson; Melville Webber
- Written by: Edgar Allan Poe (story); Melville Webber (screenplay)
- Produced by: Film Guild
- Starring: Herbert Stern; Hildegarde Watson; Melville Webber
- Cinematography: James Sibley Watson; Melville Webber
- Music by: Alec Wilder
- Release date: 1928
- Running time: 13 minutes
- Country: United States
- Languages: Silent film English intertitles

The Fall of the House of Usher is a 1928 short silent horror film adaptation of the 1839 short story "The Fall of the House of Usher" by Edgar Allan Poe. The movie was co-directed by James Sibley Watson and Melville Webber, and starred Herbert Stern, Hildegarde Watson, and Melville Webber (who also wrote the screenplay). It tells the story of a brother and sister who live under a family curse. An avant-garde experimental film running only 13 minutes, the visual element predominates, including shots through prisms to create optical distortion. There is no dialogue in the film, though one sequence features letters written in the air moving across the screen.

A music score was written in 1959 for the film by the directors' friend, composer Alec Wilder. His 1959 score was his second attempt (after the score for winds, brass and percussion which he did for them originally in 1929), and he composed it for a recording of the New York Woodwind Quintet and a percussionist, conducted by Leon Barzin. The film and the 1959 score were later synched together by James Sibley Watson, and this was the version that was placed in the National Film Registry in 2000. Various new scores have been composed to accompany the film, including one by new wave musician Tom Verlaine and guitarist Jimmy Rip, and another by American composer Jean Hasse's version (2010) for the UK ensemble Counterpoise (violin, trumpet, saxophone, piano), this version available to view on YouTube.

== Plot ==
The Fall of the House of Usher (1928)

A traveller arrives at the desolate Usher mansion to find that the sibling inhabitants, Roderick and Madeline Usher, are living under a mysterious family curse: Roderick's senses have become painfully acute, while Madeline continues to get weaker with time. When Madeline apparently dies, Roderick has her buried in the family vault, not realizing she is merely in a catatonic state. Madeline awakens in her tomb, and realizing she has been buried alive, descends into madness as she escapes her coffin and seeks revenge.

== Cast ==
- Herbert Stern as Roderick Usher
- Hildegarde Watson as Madeline Usher
- Melville Webber
- Friedrich Haak
- Dorothea House

== Criticism ==
Film historian Troy Howarth comments: "The use of superimpositions, canted angles and tracking shots combine to create a sense of delirium....(the film) jettisons any pretense of plot and character and focuses instead on the presentation of Expressionistic visual effects. The actors have little opportunity to make much of an impression, and ultimately the film is a minor footnote in the canon of Edgar Allan Poe."

== Influence ==
In 2000, the United States Library of Congress deemed the film "culturally, historically, or aesthetically significant film" and selected it for preservation in the National Film Registry.

== See also ==
- Treasures from American Film Archives
- The Fall of the House of Usher (1928 French film)
