= Dale Davis (poet) =

American poet

Dale Tristany Davis is an American writer, educator, publisher, producer, scholar, and advocate for young people and those incarcerated. She was one of the founding poets of the New York State Poets in the Schools program. As a publisher, she established The Sigma Foundation, a limited edition, private press with Dr. James Sibley Watson, Jr. avant-garde filmmaker and publisher and editor of The Dial magazine, the leading modernist journal of arts and letters. The Sigma Foundation published the work of Margaret Caroline Anderson, Mina Loy, and Djuna Barnes. The Sigma Foundation’s books are in many permanent collections, including The Collection of American Literature, Beinecke Library, Yale University and The Collection of American Women, Smith College.

In 1979, building upon what she learned teaching as a poet in K-12 classrooms, Davis established the New York State Literary Center (NYSLC) to create relevant and engaging arts education programs that addressed the needs and concerns of children. NYSLC's education programs grew through their focus on students at the highest risk for educational failure. In 2013 NYSLC's Incarcerated Education Program was inaugurated. Since 2021, NYSLC has moved to research concentrating on carceral education and the children of incarcerated parents.

Dale Davis has lectured and conducted teacher education programs in Juneau, Alaska, Honolulu, Hawaii, the Mississippi Delta, and throughout the country. She served as a consultant for youth-related topics to ABC Network and has presented papers on her work with young people at state and national conferences. She has served as a panelist for Massachusetts Cultural Council’s first Creative Teaching Fellowships Program, as well as an Education Panelist and Literature Panelist for The New York State Council on The Arts.

As an advocate for Teaching Artists, Davis was one of the founders of the New York State Association of Teaching Artists (ATA)in 1998. In 2006, she became the Association of Teaching Artists’ first Executive Director. She established ATA’s Distinguished Service to the Field Award, the 1st award presented to a Teaching Artist in New York State in the arts education field. In 2011 she convened the first National Teaching Artists Forum. In 2012 she established ATA’s Teaching Artist Appreciation Week to celebrate the work of the individual Teaching Artists. In 2019 when she left ATA she was presented with ATA's Distinguished Service to The Field Award. Following ATA her interests expanded to the intersections of art and education, how artists navigate the environments in which they find themselves. THE ARTIST AS EDUCATOR began here, as an idea to gather, explore, and share the meeting points of the artist as an educator.

Dale Davis’ installations, combining the writing of young people and her own photographs, have been exhibited in several prominent venues. With NYSLC she has published over 600 books of writing by young people, 30 children's books by incarcerated youth, and has produced 30 CDs with youth who participated in the NYSLC's programs. She has written 15 hip hop theater pieces adapted from the writing of those in NYSLC's programs that have been performed in high schools across New York State, nationally in juvenile justice facilities and in correctional facilities. Her writing has appeared in publications from The Iowa Review to Op-Ed in The New York Times to Chalkboard (New York Foundation for the Arts). Her publications also include chapters in Unseen Cinema: Early American Avant-Garde Film, 1993-1941 and Classics In The Classroom.
