= William K. Everson =

American historian (1929–1996)

- Born: William Keith Everson; 8 April 1929; Yeovil, Somerset, England
- Died: 14 April 1996 (aged 67); New York City, U.S.
- Occupations: Archivist, author, critic, educator, collector and film historian

William Keith Everson (8 April 1929 – 14 April 1996) was an English-American archivist, author, critic, educator, collector, and film historian. He also discovered several lost films. Everson's given first names were Keith William, but he reversed them so that "William K." would mimic the name of Hollywood director William K. Howard, whom he admired.

== Early life and career ==
Everson was born in Yeovil, Somerset, the son of Catherine (née Ward) and Percival Wilfred Everson, an aircraft engineer. His earliest jobs were in the motion picture industry; as a teenager he was employed at Renown Pictures as publicity manager. He began to write film criticism and operated several film societies.

== Later career ==
Following service in the British Army from 1946 to 1948, Everson worked as a cinema theatre manager for London's Monseigneur News Theatres. Emigrating to the United States in 1950 at age 21, he worked in the publicity department of Monogram Pictures (later Allied Artists) and subsequently became a freelance publicist.

Concurrently with his employment as writer, editor and researcher on the TV series Movie Museum and Silents Please, Everson became dedicated to preserving films from the silent era to the 1940s which otherwise would have been lost. Through his industry connections, he began to acquire feature films and short subjects that were slated to be destroyed or abandoned.

Many of his discoveries were projected at his Manhattan film group, the Theodore Huff Film Society, founded by Theodore Huff (filmmaker and the biographer of Charlie Chaplin), Everson, film critic Seymour Stern and Variety columnist Herman G. Weinberg as the Theodore Huff Film Society. After Huff's death, Everson added the word "Memorial". At each screening, Huff members were presented with extensive program notes written by Everson about each film. During the 1960s, these screenings were held in a hall at Union Square.

Occasionally, he would make special arrangements with a select invited group to see a 35mm print in a theater. For example, on a Sunday morning in the mid-1960s, he took over Daniel Talbot's New Yorker Theater to show the silent She (1925) to an audience of no more than 15 silent-film buffs. Later, the Huff Society screenings relocated from Union Square to The New School, by invitation of Everson's friend and fellow Huff Society member Joseph Goldberg, who was a professor at The New School. Everson was an influential figure to the generation of film historians who came of age from the 1960s to the 1980s, many of whom were regulars at his New School screenings. Other attendees at the Huff Society included such New York personalities as author Susan Sontag and publisher Calvin Beck.

Kevin Brownlow described an infamous incident at the Huff Society:

It was a society that showed the rarest films — often in a double bill with a recognised classic. Everson's programme notes became world-famous (and let us hope that some enterprising publisher will bring them out).

In 1959, MGM's Ben-Hur received rave reviews and Everson felt they were not deserved — so he showed the 1925 version at the Huff. Rival collector Raymond Rohauer, experiencing a little trouble himself over a lawsuit from MGM, told the FBI what Everson was doing, and they confronted him after the performance. They seized the print, and Everson spent the next few days squirreling other hot titles around New York. Lillian Gish had to intervene on his behalf.

In the 1970s, the FBI instituted a "witch hunt" among film collectors, but by then Everson was too highly respected to be touched. Archives came to depend on him — he would not only loan rare prints for copying or showing, but he would travel the world presenting the films he loved. I was astounded to meet him at an airport weighed down by three times as many cans of films as any human could be expected to carry. He had the uncanny knack of finding lost films. It would be no exaggeration to say that single-handedly, he transformed the attitude of American film enthusiasts towards early cinema.

Many of Everson's film programs were assembled from his own personal collection, which comprised over 4,000 titles by the 1970s. These screenings usually showcased minor masterpieces and critically overlooked B pictures that he deemed worthy of reappraisal. He brought these rediscoveries to other venues, such as the Pacific Film Archive and the Telluride Film Festival.

He worked as a consultant to producers and studios preparing silent-film projects, and collaborated closely with Robert Youngson, screening and assembling the best in silent comedy for Youngson's feature-length revivals. (Everson even wrote some of Youngson's promotional feature articles for publication.) He assisted in the production of the syndicated TV series The Charlie Chaplin Comedy Theatre (1965) and its offshoot feature film The Funniest Man in the World (1967). He was technical advisor on David L. Wolper's TV specials Hollywood, the Golden Years (1961) and The Legend of Rudolph Valentino (1982).

From 1964 to 1984 he taught film history at The School of Visual Arts, and from 1972 to 1996 was professor of cinema studies at New York University's Tisch School of the Arts. He also taught film history courses at The New School. His courses often had an emphasis on comedy, Westerns and British films. Everson sometimes discussed film history as a guest on Barry Gray's late-night radio talk show in New York. He appeared as an actor in Louis McMahon's serial parody Captain Celluloid vs. the Film Pirates (1966); the four-part film, made by a cast and crew of like-minded movie buffs, concerned heinous traffic in rare silent-screen masterpieces.

In 1994, the National Board of Review established the William K. Everson Award for Film History, of which Everson was the first recipient.

== Works ==
- Classics of the Silent Screen (1959) – attributed to Joe Franklin but actually written by Everson
- The Western: From Silents to Cinerama (1962) with George N. Fenin; updated and retitled as The Western: From Silents to the Seventies (1973)
- The American Movie (1963)
- The Bad Guys: A Pictorial History of the Movie Villain (1964)
- The Films of Laurel and Hardy (1967)
- The Art of W. C. Fields (1967)
- A Pictorial History of the Western Film (1969)
- Days of Thrills and Adventure: An Affectionate Pictorial History of the Movie Serial (foreword, 1970) by Alan G. Barbour
- The Films of Hal Roach (1971)
- The Detective in Film (1972)
- Classics of the Horror Film (1974)
- Claudette Colbert (1976)
- American Silent Film (1978)
- Love in the Film: Screen Romance from the Silent Days to the Present (1979)
- The Further Perils of Dracula (foreword, 1979) by Jeanne Youngson
- More Classics of the Horror Film (1986)
- The Hollywood Western (1992)
- Hollywood Bedlam: Classic Screwball Comedies (1994)

In addition, Everson contributed articles and reviews to numerous film magazines, including Films in Review (1909–), Variety and Castle of Frankenstein.

== Death and legacy ==
On 14 April 1996, Everson died of prostate cancer at the age of 67 in Manhattan, and he was survived by his wife, Karen Latham Everson, his daughter, playwright Bambi Everson (named for ballerina Bambi Linn), his son, Griffith and his granddaughter, Sarah. His film collection was taken over by his widow and moved to the George Eastman Museum. Most of his manuscripts, film screening notes and memorabilia were donated to the Tisch School of the Arts at New York University, comprising the William K. Everson Collection.

In 2004, Everson was inducted into the Monster Kid Hall of Fame at the Rondo Hatton Classic Horror Awards.
