= Frank Sinatra Conducts the Music of Alec Wilder =

Studio album by Frank Sinatra
- Released: 1946
- Recorded: March 31, 1939 – December 10, 1945, Los Angeles
- Genre: Jazz, classical
- Length: 44:14
- Label: CBS Records

Frank Sinatra chronology
Frank Sinatra Conducts the Music of Alec Wilder (1946)	Frank Sinatra Conducts Tone Poems of Color (1956)

Professional ratings
Review scores
Source	Rating
Allmusic	4/5 stars

Frank Sinatra Conducts the Music of Alec Wilder is an album of compositions by Alec Wilder, conducted by Frank Sinatra, released in 1946. This was Sinatra's recording debut as a conductor. He later conducted a full symphony orchestra on Frank Sinatra Conducts Tone Poems of Color (1956), including two further Wilder compositions.

== Track listing ==
The original COLUMBIA (78, M-637) 1946 album contained tracks 1–6.

Tracks 7–13 are older recordings (From 1939 to 1940), performed by the Alec Wilder Octet and not conducted by Sinatra, which were added in 1950 for the Columbia 12" (ML-4271).

1. "Air for Oboe" (Soloist, Mitch Miller) – 3:35
2. "Air for Bassoon" (Soloist, Harold Goltzer) – 4:34
3. "Air for Flute" (Soloist, Julius Baker) – 4:33
4. "Air for English Horn" (Soloist, Mitch Miller) – 3:57
5. "Slow Dance" – 4:06
6. "Theme and Variations" – 4:11
7. "Such a Tender Night" – 3:05
8. "She'll Be Seven in May" – 2:59
9. "It's Silk, Feel It!" – 2:31
10. "Seldon the Sun" – 3:16
11. "Her Old Man Was Suspicious" – 2:24
12. "His First Long Pants" – 2:37
13. "Pieces of Eight" – 2:26

All pieces composed by Alec Wilder.

== Recording dates ==
- Track 1, 2 & 3 were recorded December 5, 1945.
- Track 4, 5 & 6 were recorded December 10, 1945.
- Track 7 was recorded March 31, 1939.
- Track 8 & 9 were recorded June 13, 1939.
- Track 10, 11 & 13 were recorded July 17, 1940.
- Track 12 was recorded August 7, 1940.

== Personnel ==
- Frank Sinatra – conductor (tracks 1–6) / With Woodwind Octet, The Columbia String Orchestra & Harpsichord
- The Alec Wilder Octet (tracks 7–13)
- Alec Wilder Octet includes : Jimmy Carroll, Eddie Powell, Mitch Miller, Harold Goltzer, Reggie Merrill, Walter Gross, Gerry Gillis, Frank Carroll & Toots Mondello
