= Frank Sinatra Conducts Tone Poems of Color =

Studio album by Frank Sinatra
- Released: July 23, 1956
- Recorded: February 22–March 15, 1956
- Studio: Capitol (Hollywood)
- Genres: Easy listening; light classical
- Length: 43:59
- Label: Capitol
- Producer: Voyle Gilmore

Frank Sinatra chronology
Frank Sinatra Conducts the Music of Alec Wilder (1946)	Frank Sinatra Conducts Tone Poems of Color (1956)	The Man I Love (1957)

Professional ratings
Review scores
Source	Rating
AllMusic	3/5 stars

Frank Sinatra Conducts Tone Poems of Color is a 1956 album of short tone poems by eight notable mid-20th century Hollywood composers.

The album was conducted by Sinatra and marked the first musical collaboration between Sinatra and Gordon Jenkins. Each composition was inspired by the poetry of Norman Sickel.

A chapter discussing the album, "The Colors of Ava: Tone Poems of Color and the Painful Measure of Sinatra's Passions", appears in A Storied Singer: Frank Sinatra as Literary Conceit (Greenwood Press, 2002) by Gilbert L. Gigliotti.

The album was the first to be recorded at the then-newly opened Capitol Studios, which are under the Capitol Records Tower.

== Track listing ==
1. "White, The Young in Heart" (Victor Young) – 4:14
2. "Green, The Lover" (Gordon Jenkins) – 4:05
3. "Purple, The Schemer" (Billy May) – 4:21
4. "Yellow, The Laughter" (Jeff Alexander) – 2:38
5. "Gray, The Gaunt" (Alec Wilder) – 4:29
6. "Gold, The Greedy" (Nelson Riddle) – 3:36
7. "Orange, The Gay Deceiver" (Nelson Riddle) – 4:57
8. "Black, The Bottomless" (Victor Young) – 3:58
9. "Silver, The Patrician" (Elmer Bernstein) – 4:38
10. "Blue, The Dreamer" (Alec Wilder) – 4:38
11. "Brown, The Earthbound" (Jeff Alexander) – 4:01
12. "Red, The Violent" (André Previn) – 3:57

== Recording dates ==
- Tracks 1, 7, 8 & 11 were recorded February 22, 1956.
- Tracks 9 & 12 were recorded February 28, 1956.
- Tracks 2, 4, 5 & 10 were recorded March 7, 1956.
- Tracks 3 & 6 were recorded March 15, 1956.
- All Tracks recorded & engineered by John Palladino.

== Personnel ==
- Frank Sinatra - Conductor
- George F. Boujie - Tuba & String Bass
