= Women's Club (1936 film) =

- French: Club de Femmes
- Directed by: Jacques Deval
- Produced by: Leopold Schlosberg
- Starring: Danielle Darrieux; Josette Day; Betty Stockfeld
- Cinematography: Jules Kruger
- Music by: Marius-François Gaillard
- Production company: Societe Sirius Films
- Release dates: 20 June 1936 (Paris); 26 August 1937 (US)
- Running time: 105 minutes 81 minutes (US)
- Country: France
- Language: French

Club de Femmes (a.k.a. Girls' Club or Women's Club) is a 1936 French film directed and written by Jacques Deval. The film stars Danielle Darrieux, Josette Day, Betty Stockfeld, Ève Francis, Junie Astor Valentine Tessier and Raymond Galle.

== Synopsis ==
The film revolves around the love lives of the residents of a girls boarding school. The Women's Club is a home for unmarried young women, one of those respectable institutions to which well-bred (and especially insecure) young ladies entrust their virtue for fear of losing it too quickly.

In this place of constant coming and going, several destinies intersect before diverging forever. This theme of convergence is evidenced by the unfortunate experiences of Greta, Alice, and Hélène, but also by the romantic adventure that befell Claire.

Key events in the film include a dancer who sneaks her boyfriend into the house and becomes pregnant; a student is coerced into a prostitution ring organized by the switchboard operator; and a lesbian, whose friend is raped by a client of the prostitution ring, commits murder.

== Cast ==
- Danielle Darrieux as Claire Rivier
- Josette Day as Juliette
- Betty Stockfeld as Greta Krunner
- Else Argal as Alice Hermin
- Georgette as Carol Royce
- Ève Francis as Mme. Fargeton
- Junie Astor as Helene
- Valentine Tessier as Dr. Aubry
- Raymond Galle as Robert
- Kissa Kouprine
- Marion Delbo
- Martine Mouneyres
- Carol Royce
- Colette Proust
- Madeleine Gérôme
- Greta Bulens
- Lorna Nye
- Suzanne Lemaitre
- Marie Claire Pissarro
- Elisa Ruis
- Michele Roger
- Claude Noblet
- Gabrielle Calvi
- Betty Xau

== Themes and analysis ==
American author and filmmaker Andrea Weiss says that the lesbianism in the film is largely communicated through the events portrayed in the story, and through the "spatial relationship" between Alice and Juliette. She also argues that Alice's sexual orientation is not immediately obvious through a typical visual "tell", instead her sexuality "takes the form of female identification." Leanne Dawson, a lecturer in film studies, noted that "lesbianism has long been represented on the French screen with many instances of same-sex female desire, like in Club de Femmes, in the interwar period."

Film researcher Ellen Pullar said that many films that deal with the modern woman, like Club de Femmes, "show life as a modern woman as dangerous and fraught with difficulties." Professor of film studies Christopher Faulkner observed that the film "exemplifies the complexities of affective identities and the challenges posed to dominant social norms in 1930s French cinema."

== Release ==
As a result of the Hays Code enacted in 1934, and its strict enforcement, the film was censored in the United States. Due to a lesbian being featured in the film, some of the dialogue between Alice and Juliette was removed. One of the lines removed was where Alice tells Juliette — "You’re so pretty ... If I were a man, I'd really love you." In New York, it was censored because of its sapphic overtones, and the English subtitles for the relationship between Robert and Claire were altered to indicate they were married. The film was also rejected by the British Board of Film Censors, but was eventually passed with a 12 certificate in 2000. The film was distributed in the United States by Arthur Mayer and Joseph Burstyn.

== Home media ==
The film was released on DVD in October 2000 by the British Film Institute, which was the uncut version at 105 minutes.

== Reception ==
Elaine Paterson from Time Out said that "playful, energetic, and sustaining a high level of female hysteria, the movie is certainly camp, often riotously funny, and nostalgically enjoyable, but don't expect feminist leanings just because a lesbian's around." Film critic James Travers wrote "lesbianism, prostitution, child birth out of wedlock, crime of passion, cross-dressing, female nudity — there is no shortage of material in this film to tempt the censors."

Judith Williamson of New Statesman wrote "girls in shorts leap around the gym; girls in their lingerie giggle in their bedrooms; girls are allowed to look at one another, touch one another, not because this is a lesbian film but because it is, in every sense, a full-bodied film. Its physicality is not voyeuristic but energetic, not seamy but positively bounding with health." Time Magazine observed "it is a naive, sometimes sad, sometimes merry, typically Gallic approach to a theme similar to that of Mädchen in Uniform, Eight Girls in a Boat and other film treatments of repressed girlhood."

Sight and Sound opined that "the humour — much of it revolving round the attempts of a pretty young flirt to smuggle her fiancé into the house — is pretty feeble, the narrative frequently risks stalling because director Deval pays more attention to character than story, but in its own breezy, eccentric way, this is enjoyable fare." Film critic Frank Nugent reviewed the uncut version writing the uncut version presented the stories told in the film "rather frankly, but not cheaply; with sharply drawn characters, a refreshing imprudence and an all-pervading sense of naturalness." He highlighted the performances of Darrieux and Tessier as "first rate."

== See also ==
- Cinema of France
- List of French-language films
- List of feature films with lesbian characters
- List of LGBTQ-related films of the 1930s
