= Hochstein School of Music & Dance =

Location
- Rochester, NY; United States; 43.1559°N 77.6158°W

Information
- Established: 1920
- President: Dr. Gary Palmer
- Campus type: Urban
- Website: hochstein.org

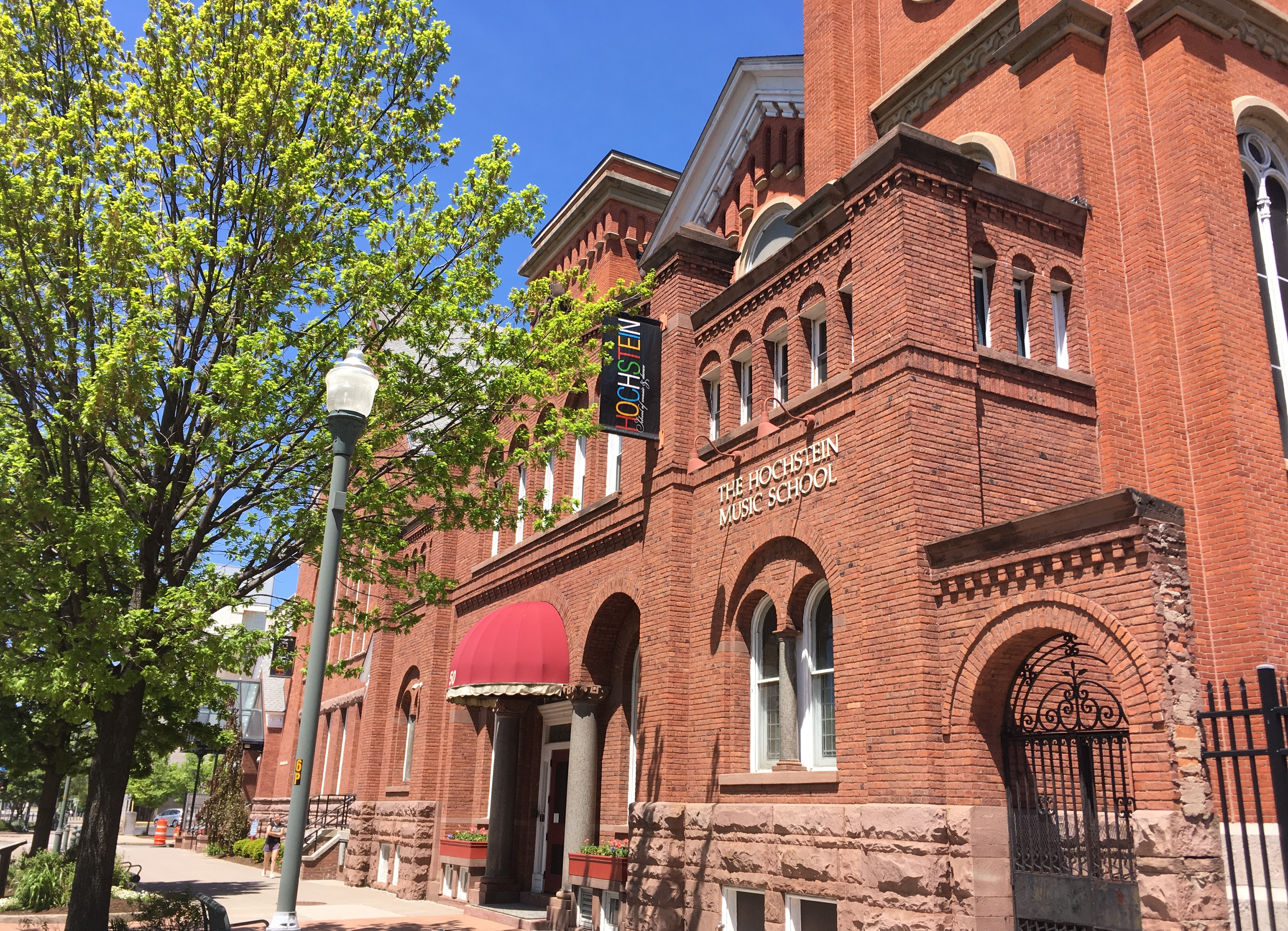
Exterior of the Hochstein School, located in the former Central Presbyterian Church

The Hochstein School (formerly Hochstein School of Music & Dance, David Hochstein Memorial Music School, David Hochstein Music School Settlement) is an all ages school of music and dance in Rochester, New York. The school was founded in 1920.

== History ==
David Hochstein was a world-renowned violinist from Rochester. When he was killed in World War I's Battle of Argonne in October 1918, elites such as George Eastman and Emily Sibley Watson joined with other citizens of Rochester to form a school in his honor. There were two benefit concerts held in 1919 to provide the seed money to start the school and in 1920, the "David Hochstein Music School Settlement" was chartered by the State of New York. As a part of the settlement movement, the goal was to provide instruction to students of all levels and socio-economic backgrounds. To support this goal, tuition was charged on a sliding scale.

Harold Gleason, head of the organ department at the Eastman School of Music and George Eastman's personal organist, became the founding director of the Hochstein School. This resulted in a partnership between the two schools in which advanced Eastman students gained practical experience teaching at Hochstein and talented Hochstein students received scholarships to continue their studies at the Eastman School.

In 1976, Hochstein became the first non-degree granting school to be accredited by the National Association of Schools of Music.

== Facilities ==
Historic Marker at the former site of the Post House, currently in front of the Hochstein School Performance Hall.

The school was originally opened in the Hochstein's family home on Joseph Avenue for 250 students. By 1928, the school had begun to outgrow this facility. Funds were raised by interested citizens for a new site to be constructed on 12 Hoeltzer Street. Another benefit concert, featuring English pianist Myra Hess, provided money for new furniture and pianos. The school remained here until 1975, when in need of more space, it is moved to the former Central Presbyterian Church on Plymouth Avenue. In 1978, the building was purchased for $1, "considered to be an appropriate fee in light of the long tradition of the importance of music in that house of worship."

Hochstein's Performance Hall is the former sanctuary of the Central Presbyterian Church and has been fully renovated as a theater. Prior to the church, it was the site of the Post House, a stop on the Underground Railroad and home to Quaker activists Isaac Post and Amy Post.

It hosts student performances as well as concerts from outside groups. Once a week, live concerts are broadcast from the Performance Hall as part of WXXO's "Live from Hochstein" concert series.

== Notable alumni ==
- Donna Lynne Champlin
- Mitch Miller
- Tim Yeung

== See also ==
- List of concert halls
- List of pre-college music schools
