= The Churkendoose =

1946 children's book by Ben Ross Berenberg

First edition

The Churkendoose: No, no wait. Before you caused me tears, now you're giving me three cheers.
'Cause I chased the fox and set you free.
Well, I don't want the tears and I don't want the cheers.
Can't you like me just because I'm me?

The Churkendoose: Part Chicken, Turkey, Duck and Goose is a 1946 children's book by Ben Ross Berenberg, illustrated by Dellwyn Cunningham. It was published by Grosset & Dunlap as a part of the Wonder Books. It was also published as What am I? I'm a Churkendoose! The story is seen as celebrating tolerance and diversity, and Berenberg wrote it for his daughter.

In the story, the strange Churkendoose is hatched on a farm. The merry but odd creature is driven away by the other animals, but is welcomed back after saving them from a fox.

The Churkendoose was made into a children's opera with libretto by Berenberg and music by Alec Wilder. The 1947 recording by Decca Records was sung by Ray Bolger and conducted by Mitch Miller. The album's liner notes said that The Churkendoose is a "mixture", and that "most Americans are mixtures too. We’re part French, part Italian, part Jew, part Catholic, part Protestant,…." In 2009, it was added to the United States National Recording Registry.
