= Madame Bovary (1934 film) =

1934 film by Jean Renoir

- Directed by: Jean Renoir
- Screenplay by: Jean Renoir
- Based on: Madame Bovary; 1857 novel by Gustave Flaubert
- Produced by: Gaston Gallimard
- Starring: Max Dearly; Valentine Tessier; Pierre Renoir; Robert Le Vigan
- Cinematography: Jean Bachelet; Alphonse Gibory
- Edited by: Marguerite Renoir
- Music by: Darius Milhaud
- Production company: Nouvelle Société des Films
- Distributed by: Nouvelle Société des Films
- Release date: 12 January 1934
- Running time: 101 minutes
- Country: France
- Language: French

Madame Bovary is a 1934 French historical drama film directed by Jean Renoir, starring Max Dearly, Valentine Tessier and Pierre Renoir, and adapted from Gustave Flaubert's 1857 novel Madame Bovary.

== Cast ==
- Max Dearly as Homais
- Valentine Tessier as Emma Bovary
- Pierre Renoir as Charles Bovary
- Robert Le Vigan as Lheureux
- Alice Tissot as Charles Bovary's mother
- Pierre Larquey as Hippolyte
- Monette Dinay as Félicité
- Louis Florencie as Parish Priest
- Romain Bouquet as Solicitor
- Christiane Dor as Madame Lefrançois
- Georges Cahuzac as Rouault
- Héléna Manson as Héloïse Bovary
- Léon Larive as Prefect
- Henri Vilbert as Dr. Canivet
- Allain Dhurtal as Surgeon
- Marthe Mellot as La vieille femme aux comices agricoles
- André Fouché as Justin
- Maryanne as Madame Homais
- Edmond Beauchamp as Binet
- Georges Deneubourg as Marquis de Vaubyessand
- Odette Dinay as Chanteuse
- Fernand Fabre as Rodolphe Boulanger
- Daniel Lecourtois as Leon
- René Blech as Coachman
- Robert Moor as Doorman
- Paulette Élambert as Berthe Bovary

== Critical reception ==
On the film's original release, Variety wrote that in interpreting the novel for film, "Renoir has done an exceptionally commendable job. Regardless of its snail-like pace, the production combines a straight simple narrative with a fine sense of background authenticity and dramatic understanding." The reviewer doubted however, that box office appeal would extend much beyond readers of the book, "despite the better than average quality of the film."

== Bibliography ==
- Donaldson-Evans, Mary. Madame Bovary at the Movies: Adaptation, Ideology, Context. Rodopi, 2009.
- Goble, Alan. The Complete Index to Literary Sources in Film. Walter de Gruyter, 1999.
