= James Sibley Watson =

American physician

James Sibley Watson Jr. (August 10, 1894 – March 31, 1982) was an American medical doctor, philanthropist, publisher, editor, photographer, and early experimenter in motion pictures.

== Early life ==
Born in Rochester, New York, James Sibley Watson Jr. was an heir to the Western Union telegraph fortune created by his grandfathers, Don Alonzo Watson and Hiram Sibley. Don Alonzo and Hiram Sibley were such close friends and business partners that they named their sons after each other: James Sibley Watson Sr. and Hiram Watson Sibley. In 1891, J.S. Watson Sr. married the daughter of his father's longtime business partner, Emily Sibley. Emily became a prominent philanthropist in Rochester, who established the city's Memorial Art Gallery. Their son, J.S. Watson Jr., thus inherited both fortune and fame, and grew up in a wealthy family that cultivated appreciation for art and encouraged an active, generous engagement in the Rochester community.

Watson graduated from Harvard on June 22, 1916, and served on the Board of Editors of the Harvard Monthly. At Harvard, Watson made two lifelong friends: his future business partner Scofield Thayer, and poet E. E. Cummings. A few months after he graduated, Watson married Hildegarde Lasell Watson, who shared her husband's enthusiasm for the arts and joined him in generously supporting various artists, including Marianne Moore, Kenneth Burke, and Gaston Lachaise. In 1918, Watson and Hildegarde had a son, Michael Lasell Watson, and a daughter in 1921, Jeanne Quackenbush. Despite his shy personality and natural reticence, Watson was a man of many talents and interests, and pursued several successful careers during his life. He not only became a medical doctor, but also contributed significantly to both the publishing and film industries. In his spare time he was also an artist, flyer, expert marksman, and inventor.

== Career at The Dial ==
Watson was directly involved in the Modernist literary movement in America through his association with the modernist little magazine, The Dial. His sojourn at The Dial began as an editorial reader while Francis Browne owned the magazine, but Watson's role grew far more substantial when Scofield Thayer approached him in 1918 with an invitation to co-purchase The Dial from financially strapped owner Martyn Johnson. Their joint venture produced its first issue in January 1920 and featured works by friends of Thayer and Watson such as Cummings and Gaston Lachaise. Though Thayer was officially editor and Watson was president, Watson in reality served as co-editor from 1920 to 1929 when the magazine ended. In addition to his editorial duties, Watson also published in The Dial, either anonymously or as "W.C. Blum" This pseudonym was a tribute to William Carlos Williams, whom Watson admired and championed despite Thayer's disagreement. Watson also translated foreign pieces for the magazine, including Rimbaud's A Season in Hell. After Thayer suffered a nervous breakdown and Marianne Moore took his place as editor in 1926, Watson assisted Moore and kept in contact with Thayer. Under the expert editorship of these three figures, The Dial developed into one of the most influential magazines in American Modernism.

== Film career ==
=== Avant-garde films ===
In the waning years of The Dial and especially after it ceased publication, Watson became increasingly interested in experimental short films. The first film he completed was Nass River Indians (1928), a 17-minute ethnographic film originally distributed in Canada and recently reconstructed. In 1926 Watson had also begun to work with Melville Folsom Webber (1896–1947), a fellow Harvard graduate who became his permanent partner in film. Together they produced a short avant-garde film, The Fall of the House of Usher (1928), which achieved widespread success and was hailed as the best contribution in motion pictures since The Cabinet of Dr. Caligari (1920). After the lesser-known Tomatos Another Day (1930), a spoof on sound-film melodrama, Lot in Sodom (1932) was their next serious avant-garde production. Though Watson claimed that these films were "amateur," they earned Watson and Webber pioneer status in the avant-garde film genre. Watson's close friend Alec Wilder also aided in the production Lot in Sodom by recruiting actors and acting as assistant director, and later wrote an original score for Fall of the House of Usher. Watson became Wilder's lifelong friend, and Wilder described him in a letter from 1975 as "my mentor, my spiritual and creative stanchion," (45) and even dedicated his autobiography to Watson.

=== Industrial and X-ray Films ===
Watson and Webber also produced an industrial film in collaboration with Bausch & Lomb called The Eyes of Science (1930), which was listed among the top ten amateur productions of 1931 by the Amateur Movie Makers staff. Watson, apparently without Webber, later produced another industrial film called Highlights and Shadows (1938) in cooperation with the Kodak Research Laboratories.

From the 1940s to 1960s, Watson immersed himself in his medical career and in a new form of filmmaking called x-ray, or cinefluorographic, motion pictures. In 1953, he and his colleagues successfully developed a process of producing 3D motion picture x-rays. Watson filmed more than 10,000 cinefluorographic exams during his work as a radiologist. Though these films are not now easily accessible (some are available at the Eastman House), Barbara Hammer has incorporated several of them in her films Sanctus (1990) and Dr. Watson's X-rays (1991).

== Later life ==
Watson continued his work as a medical doctor and philanthropist after his work at The Dial and in motion pictures. During World War II he resumed his medical career, specializing at first in gastrointestinal studies. The first color photographs of the stomach's interior have been credited to him. He proceeded to join Rochester's team of radiologists in the 1940s, which inspired his x-ray motion pictures.

Watson also continued correspondence with many of the figures whom he met during his days at The Dial and during his film career, including Cummings, Kenneth Burke and Alec Wilder. In 1978, he donated "The Hildegarde Lasell Watson Collection of Artworks by E.E. Cummings" to the college at Brockport, State University College of New York. In the 1980s, Watson founded a private press, the Sigma Foundation, with Dale Davis to publish several authors who had appeared in The Dial. The press published works of Mina Loy, Djuna Barnes, and Margaret Anderson.

Watson was also married a second time to Nancy Watson Dean, who carried on her husband's legacy of giving back to the community. She appointed Dale Davis as Watson's Literary Executor after his death, and sold the Watson Papers that Davis compiled to the New York Public Library.
