= Don Alonzo Watson =

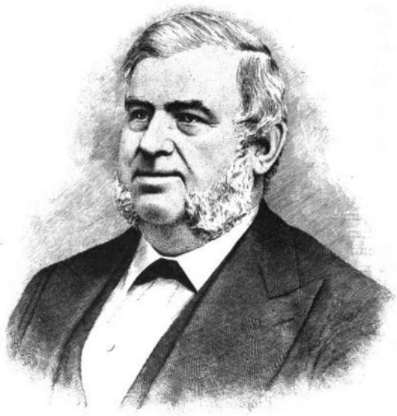
- Born: June 15, 1807; Palmer, Massachusetts
- Died: January 1, 1892 (aged 84); Rochester, New York
- Occupation: Businessman
- Spouse: Caroline M. Manning (m. 1855)

Don Alonzo Watson (June 15, 1807 – January 1, 1892) was a Rochester, New York businessman and philanthropist who, with Hiram Sibley helped found Western Union.

== Biography ==
Don Alonzo Watson was born in Palmer, Massachusetts on June 15, 1807.

He was educated at public schools, and trained as a machinist in Boston. In 1832, he moved to Honeoye Falls, New York, where he met Hiram Sibley. They were partners in a profitable machinery business for eight years.

He married Caroline M. Manning in 1855, and they had three children.

In 1856, he was a major investor in Sibley's new Western Union company.

Watson purchased a building for Rochester Homeopathic Hospital which became Genesee Hospital in Rochester. Watson also endowed a professorship to the University of Rochester in acknowledgment of the college's achievements in political science and history.

He died at his home in Rochester on January 1, 1892, and was buried near Sibley in Mount Hope Cemetery.
