= Jacques Deval =

French playwright, screenwriter and film director

- Born: 27 June 1895; Paris, France
- Died: 19 December 1972 (aged 77); Paris, France
- Other name: Jacques Boularan
- Occupations: Screenwriter, Director
- Years active: 1923–1972 (film)

Jacques Deval (27 June 1895 – 19 December 1972) was a French playwright, screenwriter and film director.

== Novels ==
- Marie Galante (1931)

== Plays ==
- Une faible femme; a comedy in three acts (1920)
- Dans sa candeur naïve; a comedy in three acts (1926); translated into English as Her Cardboard Lover (1927) by Valerie Wyngate and P. G. Wodehouse
- Étienne; a play in three acts (1930)
- Mademoiselle; a comedy in three acts (1932)
- Tovarich; a play in four acts (1933)
- Marie Galante; a play with music in two acts, based on the novel Marie Galante. Music by Kurt Weill (1934) (Note: Synopsis of the musical-play, courtesy of the Kurt Weill Foundation: "Marie is kidnapped and taken to Panama by a lecherous sea captain, who abandons her when she will not give in to his desires. She becomes a prostitute in order to earn money to return to France; meanwhile, she is unwittingly involved in an espionage plot. She spends most of her money to care for a dying black man whom no one else will tend to. When she does finally save enough money for a steamer fare, she is murdered by a spy who fears discovery the night before the boat sails.")
- Soubrette; a comedy in three acts (1938)
- Oh, Brother!; a comedy in three acts (1945)
- La Femme de ta jeunesse; a play in three acts (1947)
- Le Rayon des jouets; a comedy in three acts (1951)
- Il y a longtemps que je t'aime; a play in two acts (1955)
- La Prétentaine; a comedy in two acts (1957)
- Romancero; a play in three acts (1958)

== Filmography ==
- The Cardboard Lover, directed by Robert Z. Leonard (1928, based on the play Dans sa candeur naïve)
- The Passionate Plumber, directed by Edward Sedgwick (1932, based on the play Dans sa candeur naïve)
- A Weak Woman, directed by Max de Vaucorbeil (France, 1933, based on the play Une faible femme)
- Étienne, directed by Jean Tarride (France, 1933, based on the play Étienne)
- Journal of a Crime, directed by William Keighley (1934, remake of the 1933 film Une vie perdue)
- Marie Galante, directed by Henry King (1934, based on the novel Marie Galante)
- Tovaritch, directed by Jacques Deval (France, 1935, based on the play Tovaritch)
- Tovarich, directed by Anatole Litvak (1937, based on the play Tovaritch)
- Say It in French, directed by Andrew L. Stone (1938, based on the play Soubrette)
- Her Cardboard Lover, directed by George Cukor (1942, based on the play Dans sa candeur naïve)
- Una vírgen moderna, directed by Joaquín Pardavé (Mexico, 1946, based on the play Mademoiselle)
- Miss Tatlock's Millions, directed by Richard Haydn (1948, based on the play Oh, Brother!)
- Tuesday's Guest, directed by Jacques Deval (France, 1950, based on the play La Femme de ta jeunesse)
- Women's Club, directed by Ralph Habib (France, 1956, remake of the 1936 film Women's Club)
- La ragazza di mille mesi, directed by Steno (Italy, 1961, based on the play Le Rayon des jouets)
- Geliebte Hochstaplerin, directed by Ákos Ráthonyi (West Germany, 1961, based on the play La Prétentaine)
- L'altra metà del cielo, directed by Franco Rossi (Italy, 1977, based on the play Romancero)

=== Screenwriter ===
- Le Mauvais Garçon, directed by Henri Diamant-Berger (France, 1923)
- Jenny Lind, directed by Arthur Robison (French, 1932)
- Une vie perdue, directed by Raymond Rouleau (France, 1933)
- Women's Club, directed by Jacques Deval (France, 1936)
- Cafe Metropole, directed by Edward H. Griffith (1937)
- Domenica, directed by Maurice Cloche (France, 1952)
- When You Read This Letter, directed by Jean-Pierre Melville (France, 1953)

== Sources ==
- Crisp, Colin (1993). The Classic French Cinema, 1930-1960 (hardcover) (1st ed.). Bloomington, IN: Indiana University Press. ISBN 978-0-253-31550-2.
