= Highlights and Shadows =

- Directed by: Kenneth R. Edwards
- Written by: Kenneth R. Edwards
- Produced by: James Sibley Watson
- Narrated by: Lowell Thomas
- Cinematography: James Sibley Watson
- Music by: Howard Hanson; Bernard Rogers; Burrill Phillips; Wayne Barlow
- Production company: Research Laboratories, Eastman Kodak Company
- Release date: June 28, 1938
- Running time: 54 minutes
- Country: United States
- Language: English

Highlights and Shadows is a 1938 industrial film produced by avant-garde filmmaker James Sibley Watson on the manufacture of Kodak film and camera equipment, profiling four divisions of the Eastman Kodak Company: Camera Works, Hawkeye Works, Kodak Park and the Research Department. The extensive use of special effects throughout the film, particularly multiple exposures, emphasize the aesthetic qualities of mass production. The film is extant and a 35mm print is preserved by the George Eastman Museum.

== Release ==
Highlights and Shadows was first shown at a Hollywood meeting of the American Society of Cinematographers in June 1938, where it received praise from its audience. An article in the ASC's newsletter American Cinematographer stated that, "There is bound to be a wide field of usefulness for entertainment as well as for instruction in 'Highlights and Shadows.'" Additionally, they noted that, "The part played by machinery in making possible the production of great quantities of output was pressed home, but sight never was lost of the fundamental principle that in conjunction with the best machinery brains could devise there must be men and women of unusual intelligence and highly skilled in the manipulations of the tools and chemicals provided."

The film was never released theatrically, though Kodak distributed free 16mm prints and staged demonstrations of the film around the United States for more than a year.
