= Catharine Crozier =

American organist (1914–2003)

Catharine Pearl Crozier
- Born: January 18, 1914; Hobart, Oklahoma, U.S.
- Died: September 19, 2003 (aged 89) Portland, Oregon
- Occupation: Organist
- Instrument: Pipe organ
- Years active: 1939–2003

Catharine Pearl Crozier (January 18, 1914 in Hobart, Oklahoma – September 19, 2003 in Portland, Oregon) was a leading American concert organist and teacher.

== Early life and education ==
Catharine Crozier was born in Hobart, Oklahoma to the Rev. Walter Stuart Crozier and Alice Condit Crozier. As a child, she studied violin, piano, and organ, and made her first public appearance on the piano at age six. She studied at Central High in Pueblo, Colorado from 1927 until 1931. For college, she attended the Eastman School of Music in Rochester, New York. Studying with Harold Gleason, she earned a bachelor's degree and a Performer's Certificate in 1936 and a master's degree and Artist's Diploma in 1941. She and Gleason married in 1942.

== Teaching career ==
Crozier joined the Eastman School of Music organ department faculty in 1939, where she served as department chair from 1953 to 1955. She and her husband then resigned from Eastman, whereupon she then joined the faculty of Rollins College in Winter Park, Florida, where she taught until 1969, while also serving as organist of Knowles Memorial Chapel on campus. She enjoyed international prominence as a teacher and adjudicator.

In 2001, the American Guild of Organists established a video archive series of great organists, beginning with recordings of Crozier's teaching in The Master Series, Vol. I.

== Performing career ==
In 1941, Crozier made her concert debut in the Washington National Cathedral at the American Guild of Organists National Convention, after which she concertized across the United States, Canada, and Europe in solo recitals and with ensembles, including the New York Philharmonic, the Rochester Philharmonic Orchestra, and the Musica Aeterna Orchestra of New York. In 1955 she played the inaugural recital on Pittsburgh's Sixth United Presbyterian Church's new four-manual Aeolian-Skinner organ. In 1962, she and two other organists, E. Power Biggs and Virgil Fox, performed the inaugural recital on the new organ at Philharmonic Hall, later renamed David Geffen Hall, at Lincoln Center for the Performing Arts. She was one of the honored guests celebrating the New York Philharmonic Orchestra's 125th birthday at Lincoln Center in December 1967. Crozier also inaugurated the Kuhn Organ in Alice Tully Hall in 1975. In 1973 she was the featured organist at the International Contemporary Organ Music Festival at the Hartt School of Music.

In 1993, Crozier moved to Portland, Oregon, where she served as Artist in Residence at Trinity Episcopal Cathedral until shortly before her death in 2003 at the age of 89.

Crozier championed the works of contemporary composers, including Paul Hindemith, Vincent Persichetti, Ned Rorem, and Leo Sowerby. She was also known for her specializations in historical French and German repertoire, which she recorded extensively.

== Honors ==
Crozier was one of the few female organists to forge a highly visible career in the mid-twentieth century. Her awards include the 1979 International Performer of the Year Award (presented by the New York City Chapter of the American Guild of Organists), the Alumni Achievement Award of the Eastman School of Music, and the University of Rochester Citation to Alumni. She received honorary doctoral degrees from Baldwin-Wallace College, Illinois College, Smith College, the University of Southern Colorado, and her alma mater, the University of Rochester.

== Publications ==
Crozier co-edited several editions of the Method of Organ Playing, a method book by her husband and colleague Harold Gleason that was widely used in the United States. Following Gleason's death, she edited the seventh and eighth editions in 1988 and 1996.

== Selected discography ==
- Catharine Crozier at Grace Cathedral: Felix Mendelssohn-Bartholdy, Robert Schumann, Franz Liszt, Julius Reubke, Delos 3090
- Catharine Crozier In Recital, Gothic Records D-87904
- Catharine Crozier plays Aeolian-Skinner, opus 1309, Fleur de Lis
- Great Organ Works of Cesar Franck, Delos
- The King of Instruments: Catharine Crozier
- Leo Sowerby: Symphony for Organ in G major, Delos 3075
- New Dimensions in Organ Sound Volume XIV, Washington Records WAS XIV
- Organ Works by Ned Rorem: A Quaker Reader, Views from the Oldest House, Delos 3076
- Things Visible and Invisible: The Rosales organ, Opus 11, Trinity Episcopal Church, Portland, Oregon, Delos
