= Valentine Tessier =

French actress (1892–1981)

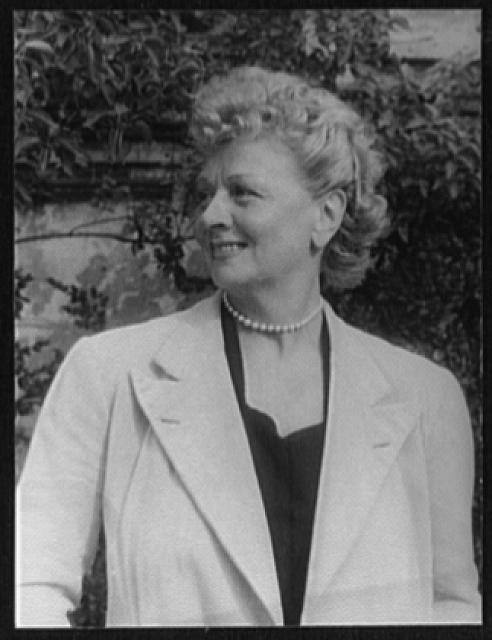
- Valentine Tessier in 1949
- Born: Valentine Anne Tessier; 5 August 1892; Paris, France
- Died: 11 August 1981 (aged 89): Vallauris, Alpes-Maritimes; France
- Occupation: Actress
- Years active: 1912–1979 (film)

Valentine Tessier (5 August 1892 – 11 August 1981) was a French actress, born to Russian parents. She appeared in around thirty films. She played the title role in Jean Renoir's 1934 film version of Madame Bovary. She also had a career on stage.

== Selected filmography ==
- The Italian Straw Hat (1928)
- Madame Bovary (1934)
- Women's Club (1936)
- Ménilmontant (1936)
- Abused Confidence (1938)
- The Phantom Carriage (1939)
- Le Lit à colonnes (1942)
- Distress (1946)
- Justice Is Done (1950)
- The Temptress (1952)
- Leathernose (1952)
- Trial at the Vatican (1952)
- Lucrèce Borgia (1953)
- Children of Love (1953)
- Quintuplets in the Boarding School (1953)
- Stain in the Snow (1954)
- Maddalena (1954)
- The Hunchback of Notre Dame (1956)
- Élisa (1957)
- Maigret and the Saint-Fiacre Case (1959)

== Bibliography ==
- Donaldson-Evans, Mary. Madame Bovary at the Movies: Adaptation, Ideology, Context. Rodopi, 2009.
