= Herman G. Weinberg =

Herman G. Weinberg (9 August 1908 – 7 November 1983) was an American subtitler, film journalist and author. He pioneered the use of English subtitles for foreign films, beginning in the early days of sound film and continuing until the 1960s. He subtitled more than 300 foreign films, including many classics. He wrote several books on film as well as an autobiography, A Manhattan Odyssey (1982). He was an expert on the films of Ernst Lubitsch, Josef von Sternberg and Erich von Stroheim.

== Weinberg as film subtitler ==
Weinberg's film translation work grew out of an early job rearranging the symphonic scores of imported German silent films for the string quartet at the Fifth Avenue Playhouse in Manhattan. In an interview from 1960 he describes his early experiments in titling foreign films:

At first we tried the technique used for silent pictures. Every couple of minutes there would be a full-screen title announcing that 'Eric has left Maria to go to Switzerland with Hedwig. We shall see what happens.' But that didn't work because there were always a few people who could understand German, and they would laugh at the spoken jokes in the film. Everybody else got annoyed because they thought they were missing something [...]

Using a Moviola, Weinberg then began to superimpose titles over the moving images of the film:

At the beginning, I was very cautious and superimposed hardly more than 25 or 30 titles to a ten-minute reel...Then I'd go into the theatre during a showing to watch the audience's faces, to see how they reacted to the titles. I'd wondered if they were going to drop their heads slightly to read the titles at the bottom of the screen and then raise them again after they read the titles [...] but I didn't have worried [...] they didn't drop their heads, they merely dropped their eyes, I noticed.

Weinberg went on to translate films from a number of languages, including some languages he did not know, and for which he was obliged to work from a literal translation. He subtitled films from German, French, Italian, Spanish, Hungarian, Greek, Czechoslovak, Swedish, Japanese, Finnish and Hindi.

== Life and writings ==
Alongside his subtitling work Weinberg was also a cinema manager in New York and Baltimore in the 1930s and 1940s. His short silent film Autumn Fire, made in 1931, and starring Erna Bergman and Willy Hildebrand, is considered an example of contemporary avant-garde filmmaking. He was a contributor of articles to, among others, Close Up, Films in Review, Sight & Sound, Film Culture and Cahiers du Cinéma. In 1960 Weinberg served as a judge for the fourth annual San Francisco International Film Festival.

In 1970 Fritz Lang provided a preface for Weinberg's book Saint Cinema, calling Weinberg 'much more than a charming, witty, and amusing raconteur' and 'this Boswell of the art of our century [film]'. Haden Guest says of his film journalism that it 'invented [...] ambitious and often provocative categories of film history'. His books have been translated into several languages; The Lubitsch Touch has been translated into Spanish and French.

Filmmaker and film critic Jonas Mekas writing his film column in the Village Voice gave his 1968 tribute of the year to Weinberg for the Sternberg and Lubitsch books: "[H]e writes with so much love for the movies that you read and you go crazy thinking about where you are going to see those movies, and when."

Weinberg's papers are preserved in the Archives and Manuscripts Collection of the New York Public Library.

== Films subtitled ==
Over several decades, Weinberg provided English subtitles for more than 300 films. Some notable titles include:

- Two Hearts in Waltz Time (von Bolvary, 1930)
- The Threepenny Opera (Pabst, 1931)
- The Testament of Dr. Mabuse (Lang, 1931)
- La Grande Illusion (Renoir, 1937)
- Roma, città aperta (Rossellini, 1945)
- Paisan (Rossellini, 1946)
- Shoeshine (de Sica, 1947)
- Bicycle Thieves (de Sica, 1948)
- La Strada (Fellini, 1954)
- Il grido (Antonioni, 1957)
- The 400 Blows (Truffaut, 1959)
- Accattone (Pasolini, 1961)

== Bibliography ==
Weinberg's book-length publications, some of which are collections of shorter pieces of journalism, are as follows:

- Fifty Years of Italian Cinema. Rome: Carlo Bestetti, 1954
- Josef von Sternberg: A Critical Study of the Great Film Director. New York: Dutton, 1967
- Saint Cinema: Selected Writings 1929-1970. London: Vision Press, 1970
- The Complete Greed of Erich Von Stroheim, a Reconstruction of the Film in 348 Still Photos Following the Original Screenplay Plus 52 Production Stills. New York: Arno Press, 1972 ISBN 0-405-03925-5
- The Complete Wedding March of Erich von Stroheim. Boston: Little, Brown, 1974
- Stroheim: A Pictorial Record of his Nine Films. Dover, 1975
- The Lubitsch Touch: A Critical Study. Dover, 1978
- A Manhattan Odyssey: A Memoir. New York: Anthology Film Archives, 1982
- Coffee, Brandy, and Cigars: A Kaleidoscope of the Arts and That Strange Thing Called Life. New York: Anthology Film Archives, 1982
