= Genesee Hospital =

The Genesee Hospital
- Via Health

Geography
- Location: Rochester, New York, United States
- Coordinates: 43°8′59.2″N 77°35′44.2″W

Organization
- Type: General

History
- Opened: 1887
- Closed: May, 2001

Links
- Lists: Hospitals in New York State

Genesee Hospital was a hospital in Rochester, New York, United States, that was open from 1887, to May, 2001.

== Closure ==
In April 2001, Via Health, the company that owned the hospital, announced that the hospital would close within 90 days in an effort to cut costs. The move was met with criticism from community members and workers at the hospital.

The hospital site and buildings remained intact after the hospital's closure, and ViaHealth retained a presence, with a diabetes center and some other facilities. In April 2006, Buckingham Properties purchased the site, and in February 2007, announced that the property would be transformed into a mixed-use site, with apartments, offices and retail space.
