= Alec Wilder =

American composer (1907–1980)

Background information
- Born: Alexander Lafayette Chew Wilder; February 16, 1907
- Origin: Rochester, New York, United States
- Died: December 24, 1980 (aged 73) Gainesville, Florida, United States
- Genres: Classical music, popular music
- Occupation: Composer

Alexander Lafayette Chew Wilder (February 16, 1907 – December 24, 1980) was an American composer, author, and radio host. He wrote thousands of pieces of music across various genres, including American popular song and classical music. Though his musical compositions were not always widely known during his lifetime, he became known for his 1972 book, American Popular Song: The Great Innovators, 1900–1950. He also hosted a Peabody Award-winning radio series, American Popular Song with Alec Wilder and Friends, on National Public Radio (NPR) in the mid-1970s.

== Biography ==
Wilder was born in Rochester, New York, United States, to a prominent family; the Wilder Building downtown (at the "Four Corners") bears the family's name and his maternal grandfather, and namesake, was prominent banker Alexander Lafayette Chew. As a young boy, he traveled to New York City with his mother and stayed at the Algonquin Hotel. It would later be his home for the last 40 or so years of his life. He attended several prep schools, unhappily, as a teenager. Around this time, he hired a lawyer and essentially "divorced" himself from his family, gaining for himself some portion of the family fortune.

He was largely self-taught as a composer; he studied privately with the composers Herman Inch and Edward Royce, who taught at the Eastman School of Music in the 1920s, but never registered for classes and never received his degree. While there, he edited a humor magazine and scored music for short films directed by James Sibley Watson. Wilder was eventually awarded an honorary degree in 1973.

He was good friends with Frank Sinatra, Peggy Lee, Tony Bennett and others who helped develop the American popular music canon. Among the popular songs he wrote or co-wrote were "I'll Be Around" (a hit for the Mills Brothers), "While We're Young" (recorded by Peggy Lee and many others), "Blackberry Winter", "Where Do You Go?" (recorded by Sinatra) and "It's So Peaceful in the Country". He also wrote many songs for the cabaret artist Mabel Mercer, including one of her signature pieces, "Did You Ever Cross Over to Sneden's?". Wilder occasionally wrote his own lyrics, including for his most famous song "I'll Be Around". Other lyricists he worked with included Loonis McGlohon, William Engvick, Johnny Mercer and Fran Landesman.

In addition to writing popular songs, Wilder also composed classical pieces for unique combinations of orchestral instruments. The Alec Wilder Octet, including Eastman classmate Mitch Miller on oboe, recorded several of his originals for Brunswick Records in 1938-40. His classical numbers, which often had off-beat, humorous titles ("The Hotel Detective Registers"), were strongly influenced by jazz. He wrote eleven operas; one of which, Miss Chicken Little (1953), was commissioned for television by CBS. Wilder also arranged a series of Christmas carols for Tubachristmas. On April 7, 1961, tuba player Roger Bobo performed Alec Wilder's Tuba Sonata at Carnegie Recital Hall in Manhattan. The performance was reviewed in the Time magazine article "Music: Bobo Among the Barcarolles."

Sinatra conducted the Columbia String Orchestra on Frank Sinatra Conducts the Music of Alec Wilder, an album of Wilder's classical music (1946). Wilder also contributed two tone poems, "Grey" and "Blue", to the 1956 album, Frank Sinatra Conducts Tone Poems of Color.

Wilder wrote the definitive book American Popular Song: The Great Innovators, 1900–1950 (1972). He was also featured in a radio series based on the book, broadcast in the middle to late 1970s. With lyricist Loonis McGlohon (his co-host on the radio series) he composed songs for the Land of Oz theme park in Banner Elk, North Carolina.

Wilder loved puzzles: he created his own cryptic crosswords, and could spend hours with a jigsaw puzzle. He also loved to talk (he had an encyclopedic knowledge of the world) and most of all, laugh. Displeased with how Peggy Lee improvised the ending of "While We're Young", he wrote her a note: "The next time you come to the bridge [of the song], jump!" Pianist Marian McPartland told the story of this "alleged" comment to Tony Bennett, on her "Piano Jazz" radio show in 2004.

== Personal life and death ==
Wilder was known for his unconventional and nomadic lifestyle. He loved trains, kept no real home, and was in a constant state of travel. Despite his constant movement, he maintained a permanent room at the Algonquin Hotel in New York, where they kept his clothes and often had a drink waiting for him.

In letters to writer Whitney Balliett, who profiled him for The New Yorker in 1973, Wilder reflected on his personal philosophy. He wrote that his life was "divided between travel and music and my friends and solitude," and that he needed to be alone to "refill my cup." He also expressed a desire to be a "better person and a better creator," and stated, "I hate to see people I love unless I have enough to give them."

Wilder died in Gainesville, Florida, from lung cancer in December 1980, and is buried in a Catholic cemetery in Avon, New York, outside Rochester.

== Selected works ==
Opera

- 3 children's operas: The Churkendoose; Rachetty Pachetty House, Herman Ermine in Rabbit Town (1942)
- The Lowland Sea (1952)
- Miss Chicken Little (1953)
- Sunday Excursion (1953)
- Kittiwake Island (1954)
- The Long Way (1955)
- The Impossible Forest (1958)
- The Truth about Windmills (1973)
- The Tattooed Countess (1974)
- The Opening (1975)

Musical

- Pinocchio (1957)
- Hansel and Gretel (1958)
- Miss Chicken Little (1953).
- Nobody’s Earnest (1978).

Film music

- The Fall of the House of Usher (1928)
- Lot in Sodom (1933)
- Make Mine Music (1946)
- Albert Schweitzer (1957), documentary by Jerome Hill
- The Sand Castle (1961), directed by Jerome Hill
- Open the Door and See All the People (1964), directed by Jerome Hill

Large ensemble

- A Child’s Introduction to the Orchestra (1954). Text by Marshall Barer. A musical primer. Eighteen movements featuring individual instruments of the orchestra. [Ludlow]
- Names from the War (1961), for narrator, chorus, brass quintet, and woodwind quintet
- Children’s Plea for Peace (1968). Children's SSAA chorus, narrator and wind ensemble. Text by Wilder, adapted from writings of Avon, New York schoolchildren. Dedicated to Rev. Henry Atwell. [Margun]

Songs (selected list)

- "A Child Is Born" (lyrics only)
- "A Long Night"
- "Be a Child"
- "Blackberry Winter"
- "Ellen"
- "Give Me Time"
- "I'll Be Around"
- "It's So Peaceful in the Country"
- "Lovers and Losers"
- "Mimosa and Me"
- "Moon and Sand"
- "Rain Rain"
- "That's My Girl"
- "The April Age"
- "The Rose on the Wind"
- "The Starlighter"
- "The Winter of My Discontent"
- "Trouble Is a Man"
- "Walk Pretty"
- "Where Do You Go"
- "While We're Young"
- "Who Can I Turn To"

Chamber music and solo instruments

- Air for Bassoon and Strings (1945). For Harold Goltzer
- Air for Flute and Strings (1945). For Julius Baker
- Air for Oboe and Strings (1945). For Mitch Miller
- Brass Quintets:
  - No 1 (1959) For the New York Brass Quintet
  - No 2 (1961)
  - No. 3 (1970)
  - No. 4 (1973) For Harvey Phillips
  - No. 5 (1975) For the Tidewater Brass Quintet
  - No. 6 (1977) For the Tidewater Brass Quintet
  - No. 7 (1978) For Frances Miller
  - No. 8 (1980) For Frances Miller
- Concerto No. 1 for Trumpet and Wind Ensemble (1967). For Doc Severinson
- Concerto for Euphonium and Wind Orchestra (1981; written in 1971). For Barry Kilpatrick
- Effie Suite (1960) for Tuba, Vibraphone, Piano and Drums. For Harvey Phillips
- Fantasy for Piano and Wind Ensemble (1974). For Marian McPartland
- Hardy Suite for Piano
- Jazz Suite for Four Horns (1951). Four horns with harpsichord, guitar, bass, drums.
- Octets (1939–41) Flute/Clarinet 2, oboe/English horn/, clarinet 1, bass clarinet, bassoon, harpsichord, bass, drums:
  - Bull Fiddle in a China Shop
  - The Children Met the Train
  - Concerning Etchings
  - Dance Man Buys a Farm
  - A Debutante's Diary
  - Her Old Man Was Suspicious
  - His First Long Pants
  - House Detective Registers
  - It's Silk, Feel It!
  - Jack, This Is My Husband
  - Kindergarten Flower Pageant
  - Little Girl Grows Up
  - Little White Samba
  - Neurotic Goldfish
  - She'll Be Seven in May
  - Such a Tender Night
  - Walking Home in Spring
- Seven Duets for Horn and Bassoon
- Sonata for Alto Saxophone and Piano (1960). For Donald Sinta
- Sonata for Bassoon
  - No. 1 (1968)
  - No. 2 (1968)
  - No. 3 (1982)
- Sonata for Bass Trombone and Piano (1969). For George Roberts
- Sonata for Clarinet and Piano (1963). For Glenn Bowen
- Sonata for Euphonium and Piano (1968)
- Sonata for Trumpet and Piano (1963). For Joe Wilder
- Sonata for Viola and Piano (1965)
- Sonata-Fantasy for Piano
- Suite for Flute and Marimba (1977)
- Suite for String Bass and Guitar (1980)
- Suite for Unaccompanied Flute (1975). For Virginia Nanzetta
- Suites for Piano, Nos. 1 to 4
- Suite No. 2 for Tenor Saxophone and Strings (1966). For Zoot Sims. [Margun]
- Suites for Tuba and Piano:
  - Suite No. 1 (1960) for Harvey Phillips
  - Suite No. 2 (Jesse Suite)
  - Suite No. 3 (Suite for Little Harvey)
  - Suite No. 4 (Thomas Suite)
- Three Ballads for Stan [also exists in Wilder's piano reduction as Suite No. 1 for Tenor Saxophone and Piano] (1963). For Stan Getz. [Margun]
- Twelve Duets for Horn and Bassoon
- Twelve Mosaics for Piano
- Un deuxième essai for Piano
- Woodwind Quintets:
  - No. 1 (1954) For the New York Woodwind Quintet
  - No. 2 (1956)
  - No. 3 (1958)
  - No. 4 (1959) For Bernard Garfield;
  - No. 5 (1959)
  - No. 6 (1960)
  - No. 7 (1964)
  - No. 8 (1966) [also known as 'Suite For Non-Voting Quintet']
  - No. 9 (1969)
  - No. 10 (ca. 1968)
  - No. 11 (1971) For John Barrows
  - No. 12 (1975) For the Wingra Quintet
  - No. 13

== Discography ==
Alec Wilder Octet (Columbia, 1951)

=== Albums as composer ===
By Bob Brookmeyer

- 7 x Wilder (Verve, 1961)

By Jackie Cain and Roy Kral

- An Alec Wilder Collection (Audiophile, 1990)

By Emilie Conway

- Dear World: Emilie Conway Sings Alec Wilder (2016)

By Meredith D’Ambrosio

- Another Time (Palo Alto, 1981)

By Valerie Errante and Robert Wason

- Songs of Alec Wilder (Troy)

By Eileen Farrell

- Eileen Farrell Sings Alec Wilder (Reference)

By Ghost Train Orchestra

- Book of Rhapsodies (Accurate, 2013)
- Book of Rhapsodies Vol. II (Accurate, 2017)

By Roland Hanna

- Roland Hanna Plays the Music of Alec Wilder (Tokuma [Japan], 1978)

By Vic Juris

- Music of Alec Wilder (Double Time, 1996)

By Bob Levy

- Blackberry Winter: Songs by Alec Wilder (Mark)

By Dave Liebman

- Lieb Plays Wilder (Daybreak, 2003)

By Mundell Lowe

- New Music of Alec Wilder (Riverside, 1956)

By Marian McPartland

- Marian McPartland Plays the Music of Alec Wilder (Jazz Alliance)

By John Noel Roberts

- Alec Wilder: Music for Piano (Albany TROY1294, 2024)

By Diana Robinson

- Music of Alec Wilder (Multi Media Library)

By Bob Rockwell

- Bob’s Wilder (Stunt, 2003)

By Ben Sidran

- Walk Pretty: The Songs of Alec Wilder (Go Jazz, 2002)

By Frank Sinatra

- Frank Sinatra Conducts the Music of Alec Wilder (Columbia, 1946)

By Marlene VerPlanck

- Marlene VerPlanck Sings Alec Wilder (Audiophile)

== Sources ==
- Wilder, Alec, American Popular Song: The Great Innovators, 1900–1950, ed. James T. Maher. (New York: Oxford Press, 1972; paperback ed., Oxford Press, 1975), xxxix, 536 pp.
- Wilder, Alec, David Demsey editor, Letters I Never Mailed Annotated Edition (University of Rochester Press, 2006).
- Stone, Desmond, Alec Wilder In Spite of Himself: A Life of the Composer (New York: Oxford University Press, 1996), 244 pp.
- Demsey, David and Ronald Prather, Alec Wilder: A Bio-Bibliography (Greenwood Press, 1993) Bio-Bibliographies in Music, No. 45.
- Zeltsman, Nancy, ed., Alec Wilder: An Introduction to the Man and His Music (Newton, MA: Margun Music, 1991).
- Alec Wilder page from Classical Net
- Alec Wilder at IMDb
- Alec Wilder Archive at Eastman School of Music
- Alec Wilder Centennial site
- 100 records to celebrate 100 years of Alec Wilder...and more!
- Opera Glass
