= Harold Gleason =

American organist, teacher, and scholar (1892–1980)

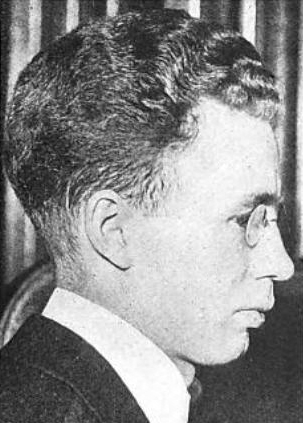
- Born: April 26, 1892; Jefferson, Ohio
- Died: June 28, 1980 (aged 88); La Jolla, California
- Occupations: Organist, teacher, lecturer, scholar
- Spouse: Catharine Crozier (m. 1942)

Harold Gleason (1892–1980) was an American organist, teacher, lecturer, and scholar. He is best known as the author of Method of Organ Playing, published in numerous editions made by him and later by his wife, concert organist Catharine Crozier.

== Biography ==
Gleason was born in Jefferson, Ohio, on April 26, 1892, and studied organ in California with the English organist Edwin H. Lemare, Lynnwood Farnam in Boston, and in Paris with Joseph Bonnet. In 1919, he was appointed organist and choirmaster of Fifth Avenue Presbyterian Church, New York City, and then in 1921 became the head of the organ department of the newly founded Eastman School of Music, University of Rochester.

He married Catharine Crozier in Colorado Springs on April 9, 1942.

He was George Eastman's personal organist and director of music at Eastman's home, as well as the founder and director of the David Hochstein Memorial Music School. He was also organist and director of music at several Rochester churches, as well as a touring recitalist. As head of the graduate division at Eastman from 1932 until his retirement in 1955, Gleason was instrumental in the development of the School's DMA degree program.

In addition to Method of Organ Playing, Gleason contributed many papers to music journals and authored two anthologies, Outlines of Music Literature and Examples of Music before 1400. He also co-authored the Anthology of Music in America, 1620–1865. He helped design pipe organs; the organs in Kilbourn Hall and in Strong Auditorium on the University of Rochester River Campus were built to his specifications.

In 1952, he was awarded the doctor of music degree, honors causa, by MacMurray College, Jacksonville, Illinois. He died at Scripps Memorial Hospital in La Jolla, California on June 28, 1980, and is buried in Mountain View Cemetery, Altadena.
