= Lewis Jacobs =

American film director (1904–1997)

- Born: 1904; Philadelphia, Pennsylvania, U.S.
- Died: February 11, 1997 (aged 92–93); Manhasset, New York, U.S.
- Education: Pennsylvania Academy of the Fine Arts
- Occupations: Screenwriter, film director and critic

Lewis Jacobs (1904 – February 11, 1997) was an American screenwriter, film director and critic. He authored several books, including The Rise of the American Film.

== Early life ==
Jacobs was born in 1904 in Philadelphia, Pennsylvania. He graduated from the Pennsylvania Academy of the Fine Arts.

== Career ==
Jacobs began his career as a screenwriter for Metro-Goldwyn-Mayer and Columbia Pictures in Hollywood. He moved to New York, where he directed several experimental short films modeled after the Soviet social and political cinema and he was fond of and drew inspirations from the likes of Dziga Vertov and Hans Richter.

In 1930, Jacobs founded the magazine Experimental Cinema, which was one of the first publications to view film as art. He spent time with noted early pioneers such as Sergei Eisenstein. He lived in Hollywood gaining acclaim as a film scholar, taking jobs such as advising and working on a draft with Orson Welles on his first feature film Citizen Kane and directing Elizabeth Taylor in her first screen tests for the film National Velvet.

After spending many years in Hollywood as a contract studio writer, including working in MGM's short-films department, he moved to New York in the late 1940s during the period of the blacklist and joined the Workers Film and Photo League as well as doing work for film trailers. In 1933 he compiled all the footage he had made during his lunch breaks and put it into the film Footnote to Fact, which was intended to be part one in a four-part documentary titled As I Walk, a look into the depths of poverty during the Great Depression in NYC. The final three parts were never completed and the original negative was believed lost until it was rediscovered by the Anthology Film Archives in 1990. The film is now available in the Unseen Cinema: Early American Avant Garde Film 1894-1941 DVD box-set, under the volume entitled "Picturing a Metropolis".

Jacobs authored numerous books on cinema, taught film courses at universities, and juried many film festivals including the Venice Film Festival. In 1967, he wrote the screenplay for the film Sweet Love, Bitter (1967), which went on to become the inspiration for Clint Eastwood's Bird.

== Death ==
Jacobs died on February 11, 1997, in Manhasset, New York, at age 93.

== Bibliography ==
- The Rise of the American Film: A Critical History With an Essay
- The Emergence of Film Art
- Introduction to the Art of the Movies: An Anthology of Ideas on the Nature
- The Movies as Medium
- The Documentary Tradition
