= Sheeler =

Sheeler is a surname. Notable people with the surname include:

- Charles Sheeler (1883–1965), American modernist painter and photographer
- Musya S. Sheeler (1908–1981), Russian dancer

== See also ==
- Sheller
