= Vladislav Mikosha =

Soviet photographer and cinematographer (1909 - 2004)

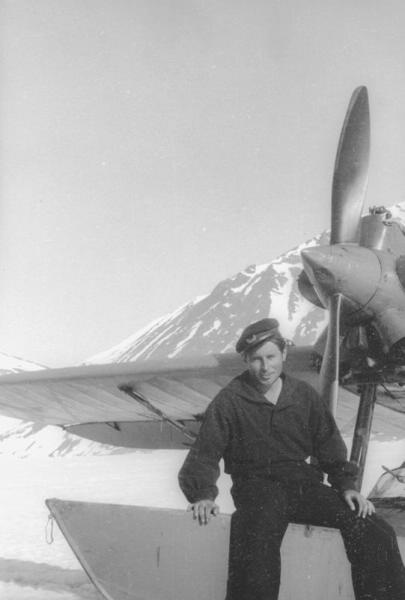
Mikosha in 1934

Vladislav Vladislavovich Mikosha (Russian: Владислав Владиславович Микоша; (Note: For Mikosha's full name, see Kozlov, s.v. Микоша В. В.) 8 December 1909 – 2004) was a Soviet photographer and film director. He captured historical events such as the destruction of the Cathedral of Christ the Saviour in 1931, the siege of Sevastopol from 1941 to 1942, the 1945 Moscow Victory Parade after the USSR's defeat of Nazi Germany, and the proclamation of the People's Republic of China in 1949. He was amongst the earliest adopters of colour photography in the Soviet Union.

Born in Saratov to a father who was a sailor, illness prevented Mikosha from attending naval school. He studied at the State Institute of Cinematography from 1929 to 1934, and in the late 1930s was employed as a photographer by multiple newspapers and magazines. During World War II, he was one of several hundred cameramen operating on the front lines, with his work being published in the USSR's largest newspaper. Following the war, he photographed meetings been major world leaders, and in subsequent decades focused on creating documentaries.

Mikosha's film of the Bolsheviks' dynamiting of the Cathedral of Christ the Saviour in 1931 was made for Stalin's viewing alone. Mikosha's videos taken as a cameraman during World War II served as the basis for multiple documentaries, and throughout his career 600 segments by him appeared in film periodicals. His works in colour include a 20-minute film of the 1945 victory parade and series of photographs from multiple Asian countries. Mikosha was awarded the USSR State Prize (previously known as the State Stalin Prize) four times, and was made a People's Artist of the USSR in 1990.

== Life ==
Vladislav Mikosha was born on 8 December 1909 in Saratov, a city situated along the Volga River. When he was seven, the October Revolution broke out. Mikosha's father was a sailor, and during his youth he wished to enter the same occupation, but health concerns precluded his attending Leningrad's naval school. In the late 1920s, Mikosha obtained an Akeley Camera, a kind of camera invented by the naturalist Carl Akeley in 1917. Mikosha claimed that he was in possession of this type of camera earlier than any other Soviet documentary filmmaker. Between 1929 and 1934, he studied at the State Institute of Cinematography. He was hired by the Soyuzkino Chronicle, and later fired after quarrelling with its director. From 1936 to 1939, he worked as a photographer for various newspapers and magazines: Izvestia, Pravda, Komsomolskaya Pravda, Ogoniok, and Sovetskoe Foto.

During World War II, Mikosha served on the front lines as a cameraman, with his work being published in Pravda, the USSR's principal newspaper at the time. He captured events such as the siege of Sevastopol, the burning of the city of Arkhangelsk following Nazi bombings, the damage wrought by the Luftwaffe upon London, and the reclaiming of Crimea, among others. Mikosha was one of around 250 Russian cameramen performing this duty; collectively, they recorded over three million metres of film. After the war, he photographed meetings involving world leaders such as Joseph Stalin, Mao Zedong, Nikita Khrushchev, John F. Kennedy, Fidel Castro, Dwight D. Eisenhower, and Jawaharlal Nehru. In 1949, he was part of a film crew who, on the orders of Stalin, travelled to China for the purpose of producing a documentary; whilst there, he captured the proclamation of the People's Republic of China on camera. Between the 1950s and the 1970s, Mikosha focused on making documentaries about either historical, revolutionary topics or contemporary issues. He died in 2004.

== Films and photographs ==
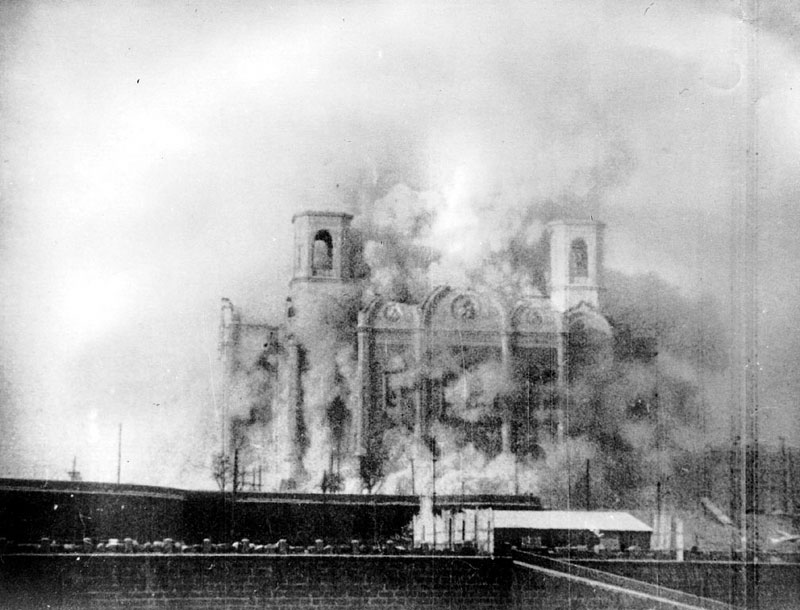
A still from Mikosha's film of the demolition of the Cathedral of Christ the Saviour in 1931

In late 1931, at the command of Kremlin officials, Mikosha filmed the destruction of the Cathedral of Christ the Saviour via dynamite. This demolition was part of a Bolshevik campaign to eliminate old churches and monasteries in Moscow. According to Leah Bendavid-Val, Mikosha was left "badly shaken" after this incident and from then on favoured projects that were distant from Moscow. The film was intended to be viewed solely by Stalin; images from his capturing of the event were first published in the late 1980s. Robert H. Greene has described Mikosha's film of the demolition as "perhaps the most iconic, or iconoclastic, example of the Soviet regime's destructive break with the Russian nation's cultural and religious past".

Multiple documentaries released in the early 1940s were based on Mikosha's wartime footage. The director Alexander Dovzhenko's 1943 documentary, The Battle for Our Soviet Ukraine, brought together footage from over 20 cameramen; Dovzhenko insisted that they shoot scenes conveying destruction and atrocity. Mikosha, upon arriving back in Moscow in 1942 after filming the siege of Sevastopol, was instructed by Dovzhenko "to show people's suffering unflinchingly". The director continued: "Death, tears, suffering. There lies a tremendous life-affirming force. Show the sufferings of the soldier wounded on the field of battle". (Note: Hicks, pp. 112–113. See Hicks for the full quote.) Mikosha wrote a memoir covering his time on the front lines, entitled Next to the Soldier. In addition to documentaries, across his career Mikosha created over 600 segments that appeared in film periodicals.

Mikosha was among the earliest Soviet photographers to employ colour in his works. In 1940, an exhibition of 120 of his photographs included 20 in colour, which the Multimedia Art Museum, Moscow, describes as a "remarkable number" for the time. A majority of his output from after World War II made use of colour, including a video of the 1945 Moscow Victory Parade lasting 20 minutes and series of photographs taken in countries such as Indonesia, Burma, and China. He was also involved in the creation of the Soviet Union's first set of colour postage stamps.

== Awards ==
The following is a selection of the honours granted to Mikosha: (Note: On Mikosha's receipt of these awards, see Gorbatsky, s.v. МИКОША, Владислав Владиславович and Kozlov, s.v. Микоша В. В.)

- USSR State Prize, previously known as the State Stalin Prize (1943, 1949, 1951, 1976)
- People's Artist of the RSFSR (1979)
- People's Artist of the USSR (1990)
- Order of the Red Banner
- Order of the Red Banner of Labour
- Order of the Badge of Honour
