= Akeley Camera =

Innovative early 20th-century camera

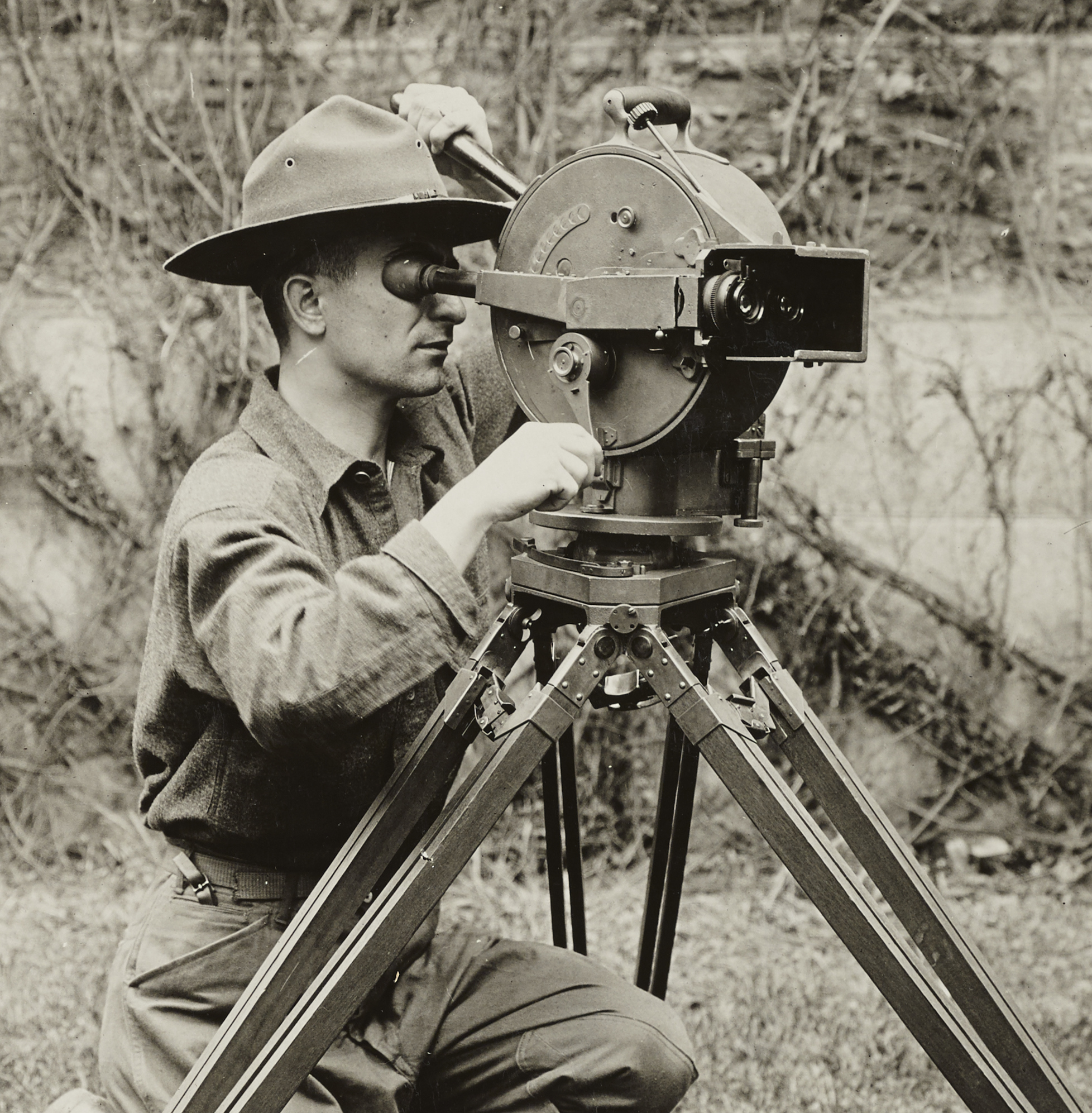
An Akeley camera in operation, c. 1921

The Akeley camera was an innovative 35mm motion picture camera designed by Carl Akeley and popular for outdoor and action filmmaking in the early 20th century.

Renowned as a taxidermist, sculptor, and conservationist, Akeley devised the camera after his experience filming wildlife in Africa exposed him to the limitations of existing equipment. Akeley's goal, as he described it, was to be able to record "a supreme moment" in the field. He created a prototype in 1914 and obtained a patent on it in 1915.

== Design ==
=== Body and form ===
The Akeley was distinctive in both form and function. Where most camera bodies of the era were rectangular or square, Akeley designed a round profile with a cylindrical aluminium body, approximately 7½ inches in diameter and only 13 inches tall with its base, far lighter and more portable than its contemporaries. Its round profile earned it the nickname the "pancake" camera. A contemporary journal remarked that to the uninitiated, its base resembled a large pie pan. Furthermore, its rugged construction was designed specifically for field use under harsh conditions; the camera was known to survive incidents that would have destroyed other equipment.

=== Shutter ===
The Akeley's shutter mechanism was unlike any other in the history of cinema technology. Conventional cameras, from the Kinetograph and Cinématographe through to the Bell & Howell 2709 and Debrie Parvo, used a flat rotating disc shutter. In contrast, the Akeley Camera used a shutter resembling a lid with a rim, rotating around the entire body of the camera. An opening in this rim produced a 230-degree shutter angle, far wider than the 180 degrees or less typical of other cameras. This design had no equivalent in cinema technology and allowed the camera to admit significantly more light, making it effective in the low-light conditions of dawn and dusk that were common in wildlife filming.

=== Viewfinder and lenses ===
On early models, the viewfinder was a tube behind the film gate, allowing the operator to frame the image by looking through the film itself, possible because early film stocks did not yet have an opaque anti-halation backing. On 22 June 1918, Akeley patented a prism-based articulating viewfinder to replace this system. The new viewfinder was coupled with a secondary lens of the same focal length as the taking lens, and both lenses were mounted on a single sliding plate. This allowed the operator to swap the entire lens pair, taking lens and viewfinder lens together, in a single motion, far faster than the two separate adjustments for taking lens and viewfinder required on most other cameras. The camera was supplied with a case containing several paired lens sets, including Zeiss lenses for normal and semi-long focal lengths and a 432mm Dallmeyer telephoto. It was the first motion picture camera to offer an articulating eyepiece, later a standard feature, but unavailable on any other camera of the era.

=== Film loading ===
In its original form, the Akeley split into two halves to accept a 60-metre spool of 35mm film loaded directly into the body, with both the unexposed and exposed film reels housed side by side within the casing. A cam and claw mechanism provided the intermittent film movement required for exposure. A built-in punch could mark the film with a small perforation, detectable by touch in the darkroom, allowing the operator to flag satisfactory or unsatisfactory takes before development.

The commercial models of the 1920s introduced a cassette loading system that dramatically simplified operation. Film was pre-loaded into self-contained cassettes, each fitted with its own sprocketed feed mechanism. Loading required only threading short length of film from the cassette into the gate, then clicking the cassette into place, an operation that took only seconds and could be performed in daylight. This system also reduced the camera's width by half, to approximately 20 centimeters, since the film no longer needed to be housed in the main body. Operators could carry several pre-loaded cassettes, allowing rapid reloading in the field, an obvious advantage for the demanding conditions of documentary and newsreel work.

In addition, the camera's film mechanism was notably silent; as the Photographic Journal of America noted, because the turning of the handle could not be heard, operators could photograph wildlife without alarming their subjects. Finally, on the opposite side from the main crank, a small foldable crank allowed single-frame exposures, enabling the operator to take still photographs alongside motion picture footage.

=== Gyroscopic head and tripod ===
The Akeley's gyroscopic tripod head was considered as significant an innovation as the camera itself. Prior to Akeley's invention, a cameraman had to operate three cranks simultaneously, one each to pan and tilt, and a third to advance the film. This made it nearly impossible to smoothly follow fast action.

Akeley's tripod instead used gears to spin a gyro flywheel, allowing the operator to produce smooth pans and tilts simply by applying pressure to a single handle on the back of the camera, rather than cranking separate levers. The operator could also shift between pan and tilt gears with the push of a button. An incorporated ball-and-socket design permitted immediate levelling of the camera, allowing the operator to set up and begin shooting quickly. A quick-release mechanism allowed the camera to be mounted on a vehicle or aeroplane within seconds, and moved between a tripod and an aircraft wing with equal speed.

== Production ==
Akeley formed the Akeley Camera Company in 1911. The company, later known as Akeley Cinema Inc., was located at 244–50 West 49th Street in New York City. The first perfected model was slated to accompany an American Museum of Natural History expedition to Asia.

When the United States entered World War I in 1917, the Signal Corps purchased the entire manufacturing capacity of the new camera, recognizing its rugged design and advanced features as ideal for combat conditions. Akeley himself participated in training military cameramen to operate it.

Records from the Akeley factory have not survived, making it difficult to determine exactly how many cameras were produced during the war years. In total, only about 400 Akeley cameras were ever manufactured, making surviving examples rare. After Akeley's death in the Congo in 1926, the company continued to produce and refine the design, though it faded from prominence by mid-century.

== Use ==
=== Wildlife and documentary filmmaking ===
Akeley himself used prototypes on his African expeditions for the American Museum of Natural History. In 1921, he became the first cinematographer to film gorillas in the wild, using his camera to shoot the film Meandering in Africa in the present day Democratic Republic of the Congo. The pioneering documentarian Robert Flaherty used two Akeley cameras to shoot his 1922 film Nanook of the North in the Canadian Arctic, taking advantage of the rapid cassette-loading system to work in harsh field conditions. Naturalists Martin and Osa Johnson, having met Akeley at the Explorers Club in New York in 1921, went on to use the camera to produce some of the earliest nature films, with funding from George Eastman.

=== Newsreels and combat ===
The Akeley became the preferred camera for newsreel work during the 1920s and 1930s. Its rugged construction made it well suited to dangerous assignments. Fox News cameraman Russell Muth, filming over Mount Vesuvius in early 1922, reported that when his aeroplane lost power and crashed into a tree, he threw the Akeley from the plane before impact. The camera survived undamaged, and his colleague used it to photograph the wreck.

=== Hollywood ===
The Akeley was frequently used in Hollywood for specialty action work. Its gyroscopic head made it particularly suited to aerial cinematography, and it was used extensively on Wings (1927), the first film to win the Academy Award for Best Picture. Over 200 cameras and nearly as many cameramen were employed on the production; aerial cinematographer Faxon Dean, ASC, was widely regarded as one of the foremost Akeley specialists of his day and served as principal cinematographer on the film's aerial sequences. Other notable Hollywood productions that employed the Akeley include The Ten Commandments (1923), Ben-Hur (1925), Hell's Angels (1930), and Only Angels Have Wings (1939).

The camera made a specialty class of operators possible. From the mid-1920s, American Cinematographer magazine carried classified advertisements placed by "Akeley Specialists", owner-operators who specialised in action shoots. By the 1930s, these operators were in sufficient demand that they were listed as a separate category on the American Society of Cinematographers roster. The distinctive look the camera produced, a sharply focused, rapidly moving subject against a blurred background, became known as the "Akeley shot" and was written into film scripts by name.

The Akeley's reputation as a symbol of advanced filmmaking technology was such that Fritz Lang, for his 1929 science fiction film Woman in the Moon, included a scene in which the character played by Gerda Maurus uses an Akeley camera to film landscapes on the lunar surface.

== Legacy ==
Though the camera itself was gradually supplanted by lighter equipment developed during World War II, such as the Mitchell and Arriflex designs, Akeley's gyroscopic tripod heads continued to be used by major studios into the late 1980s, and the concept directly influenced the development of later professional fluid heads. The ARRI Kinarri 35, the company's first 35mm camera released in 1924, was directly inspired by the Akeley's cylindrical aluminium body design.

The Museum of the Moving Image in New York holds an Akeley 35mm pancake camera in its permanent exhibition "Behind the Screen." That particular camera was used by Dennis Bossone, a cameraman for Fox Movietone News, in the 1930s. The Cinémathèque française in Paris also holds an Akeley in its collection.

== In art ==
Photographer Paul Strand's 1922 photograph Akeley Motion Picture Camera depicts the interior of an Akeley camera. Strand had purchased the camera for $2,500 and used it to work as a cinematographer throughout the 1920s.
