= Akeley Motion Picture Camera =

Photograph by Paul Strand

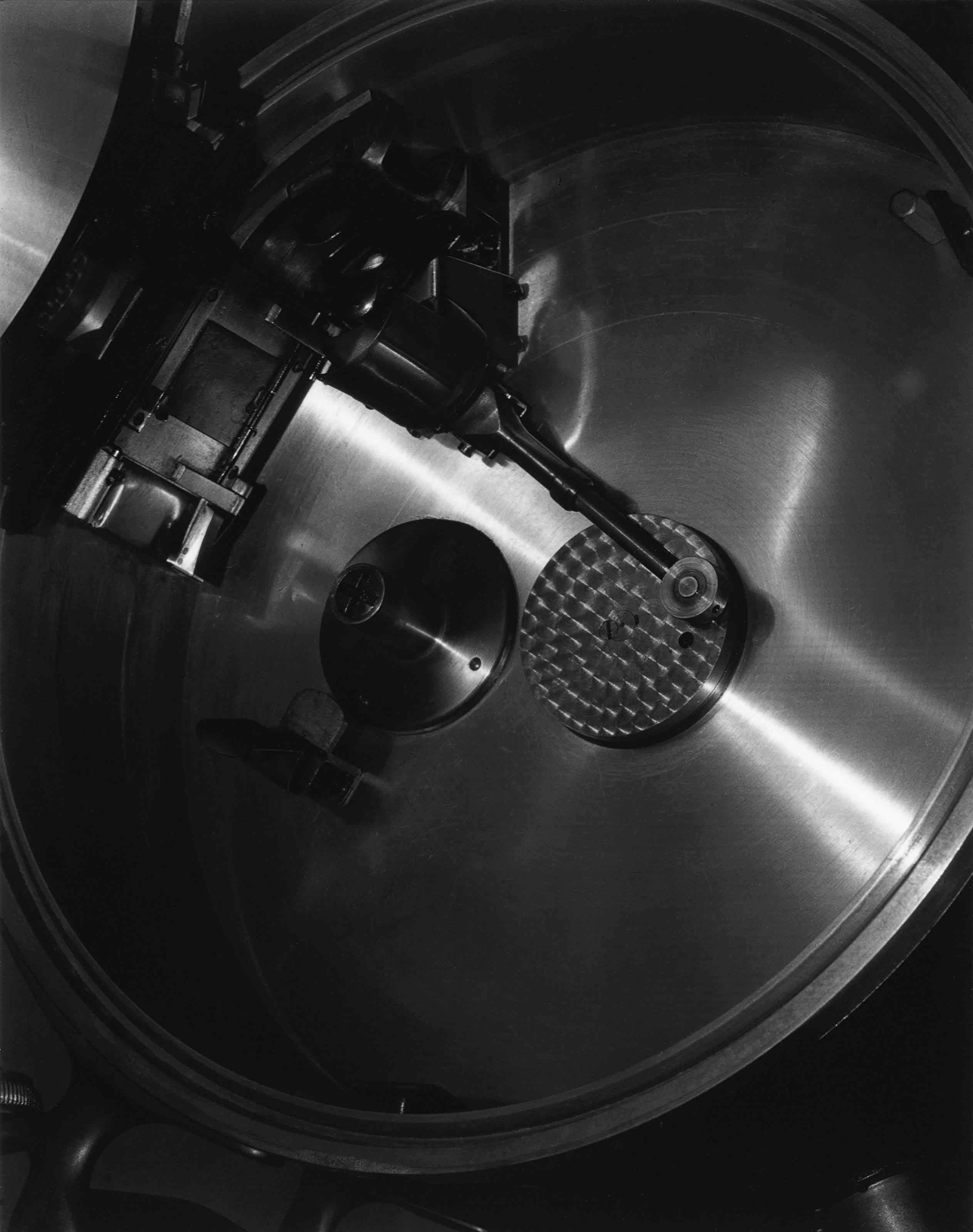
Akeley Motion Picture Camera (1922), by Paul Strand

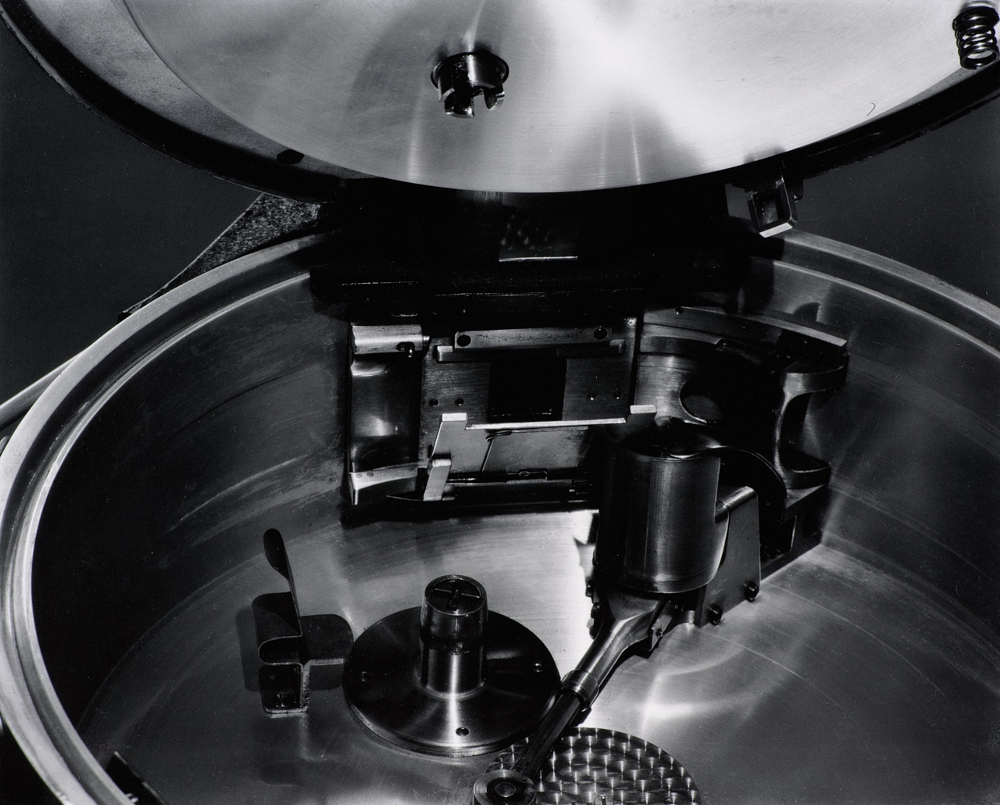
Akeley Motion Picture Camera (1922), other version

Akeley Motion Picture Camera is a black and white photograph taken by Paul Strand in 1922. It depicts the inside of an Akeley Camera, the innovative motion picture camera the photographer purchased for $2500. This allowed him to work in the film industry as a cinematographer, until 1931, when the camera became obsolete. Strand took several pictures of camera mechanisms and this became one of the most famous.

== History and description ==
Strand had worked as co-director with Charles Sheeler in the avant-garde film Manhatta, in 1920. This inspired him to buy his own motion picture camera, with which he would earn much of his living in the 1920s. He took several photographs of the camera, shortly after buying it. This picture depicts the interior film chamber, without the film, shot from upside down, at a 45-degree angle, and expresses his interest in his functional and rigorous forms and the shine of his highly polished metal surface.

== Art market ==
A print of this picture reached the highest price for a Strand photograph when it was sold by $783,750 at Christie's New York on 4 April 2013.

== Public collections ==
There are prints in several public collections, including the Metropolitan Museum of Art, in New York, and The Art Institute of Chicago.
