= Shetler =

Shetler is a surname. Notable people with the surname include:

- Anthony Shetler (born 1982), American skateboarder
- Harriet Shetler (1917–2010), founder of the National Alliance on Mental Illness
- Norman Shetler (1931–2024), pianist, puppeteer, and puppet constructor

== See also ==
- Sheller
