= Kinarri 35 =

The Kinarri 35 was the ARRI's first 35mm camera, released in 1924.

== Function ==
This was Arri's first camera, constructed by August Arnold. The Kinarri 35 was a hand cranked 35mm camera, in a round aluminum body, inspired by the Akeley camera introduced in 1919.

The crank was on the right side and the framerate was obviously completely manually adjusted, by how quick the cinematographer turned the crank. On the left side there was a foldout direct optical viewfinder with a crosshair. The left side could be removed to load the film into the camera. The internal magazine took 100 ft (30meters) daylight spools. The Kinarri 35 had a fixed Arrinar lens f2,7/40 mm. The body was made out of aluminum.

The overall design was later used for the Kinarri 16, which was released in 1928.

The name is a portmanteau of the German word for "cinema" ("kino") and the manufacturer's name, "Arri".
