= Kinarri 16 =

16mm camera model

The Kinarri 16 was the ARRI's first 16mm camera, released in 1928.

== Function ==
The Kinarri 16 was first released as a hand cranked version, in a round camera body. The crank was on the right side and the framerate was obviously completely manually adjusted, by how quickly the cinematographer turned the crank. On the left side there was a foldout direct optical viewfinder with a crosshair. The left side could be removed to load the film into the camera. The internal magazine took 100 ft (30meters). The Kinarri 16 had a fixed 25mm lens.

The overall design was very similar to the Kinarri 35, which was released four years earlier. Arri produced this camera for the amateur market.

Shortly after a spring-wound model was released, this one had a cubic camera body, and the option of adding an external magazine. The direct optical viewfinder was replaced by a glass prism on the top of the camera.

The name is a portmantau of the German word for "cinema" ("kino") and the manufacturer's name, Arri.
