= Paul Strand =

American photographer (1890–1976)

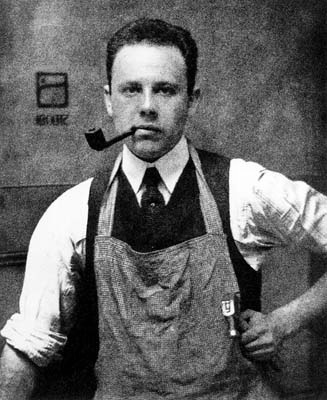
- Paul Strand in a photograph by Alfred Stieglitz (1917)
- Born: Nathaniel Paul Stransky; October 16, 1890; Brooklyn, New York, U.S.
- Died: March 31, 1976 (aged 85); Orgeval, Yvelines, France
- Known for: Photography, filmmaking

Paul Strand (October 16, 1890 – March 31, 1976) was an American photographer and filmmaker who, along with fellow modernist photographers like Alfred Stieglitz and Edward Weston, helped establish photography as an art form in the 20th century. In 1936, he helped found the Photo League, a cooperative of photographers who banded together around a range of common social and creative causes. His diverse body of work, spanning six decades, covers numerous genres and subjects throughout the Americas, Europe, and Africa.

== Background ==
Paul Strand was born Nathaniel Paul Stransky on October 16, 1890, in New York; his Bohemian (Czech) parents were merchant Jacob Stransky and Matilda Stransky (née Arnstein). When Paul was 12, his father gave him a camera as a present.

== Career ==
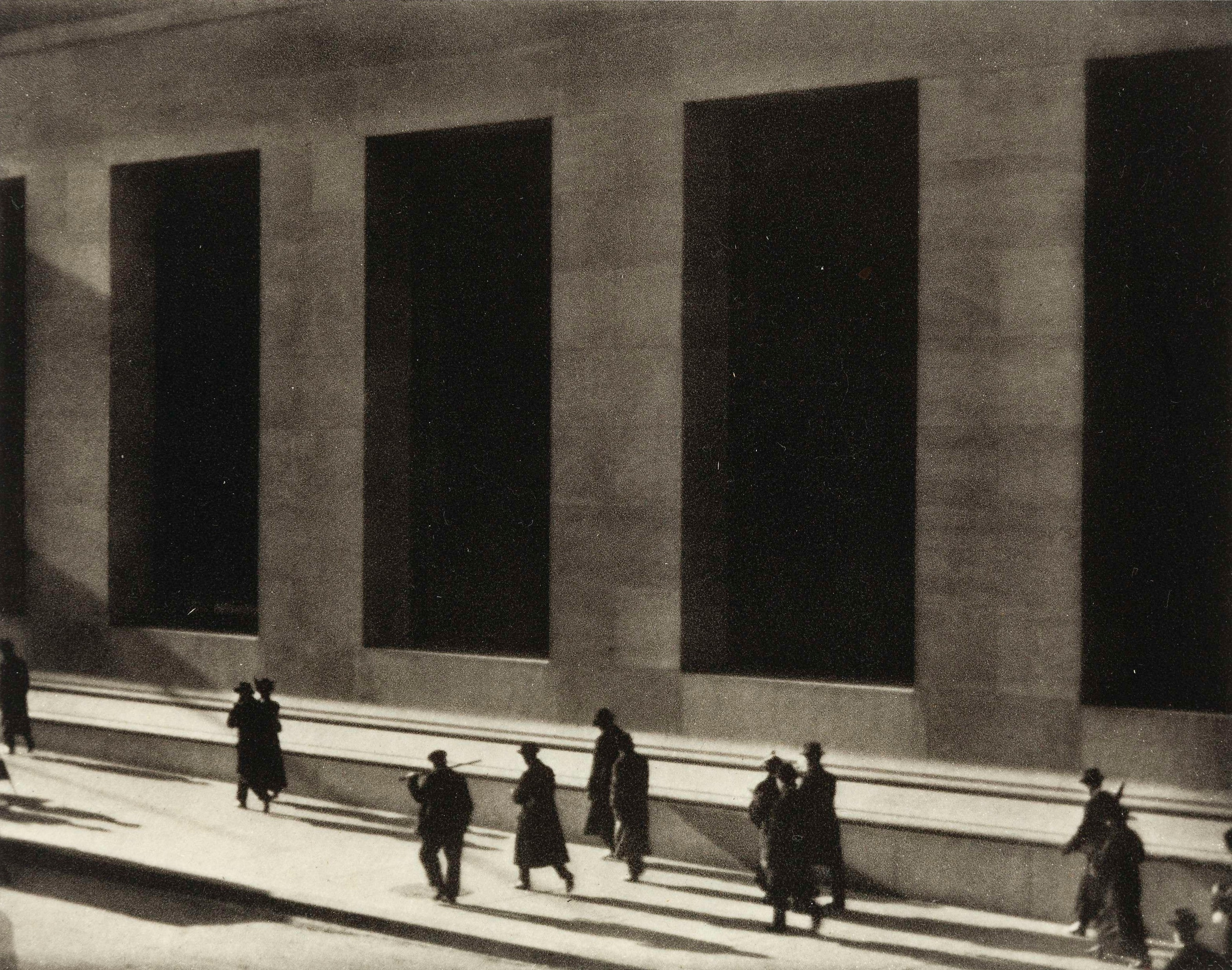
Wall Street (1915)

In his late teens, he was a student of renowned documentary photographer Lewis Hine at the Ethical Culture Fieldston School. It was while on a field trip in this class that Strand first visited the 291 art gallery – operated by Stieglitz and Edward Steichen – where exhibitions of work by forward-thinking modernist photographers and painters would move Strand to take his photographic hobby more seriously. Stieglitz later promoted Strand's work in the 291 gallery itself, in his photography publication Camera Work, and in his artwork in the Hieninglatzing studio. Some of this early work, like the well-known Wall Street, experimented with formal abstractions (influencing, among others, Edward Hopper and his idiosyncratic urban vision). Other of Strand's works reflect his interest in using the camera as a tool for social reform. When taking portraits, he would often mount a false brass lens to the side of his camera while photographing using a second working lens hidden under his arm. This meant that Strand's subjects likely had no idea he was taking their picture. It was a move some criticized.

=== Photo League ===
Strand was one of the founders of the Photo League, an association of photographers who advocated using their art to promote social and political causes. Strand and Elizabeth McCausland were "particularly active" in the League, with Strand serving as "something of an elder statesman." Both Strand and McCausland were "clearly left-leaning," with Strand "more than just sympathetic to Marxist ideas." Strand, McCausland, Ansel Adams, and Nancy Newhall all contributed to the League's publication, Photo News.

=== Still photography and filmmaking ===
Over the next few decades, Strand worked in motion pictures as well as still photography. His first film, Manhatta (1921), was made with painter/photographer Charles Sheeler. Also known as New York the Magnificent, the silent film depicted the day-to-day life of New York City. Manhatta includes a shot similar to Strand's famous Wall Street (1915) photograph. In 1932–35, he lived in Mexico and worked on Redes (1936), a film commissioned by the Mexican government, released in the US as The Wave. Other films he was involved with were the documentary The Plow That Broke the Plains (1936) and the pro-union, anti-fascist Native Land (1942).

From 1933 to 1952, Strand had no darkroom of his own and used those of others.

=== Communism ===
In December 1947, the Photo League appeared on the Attorney General's List of Subversive Organizations (AGLOSO).

In 1948, CBS commissioned Strand to contribute a photo for an advertisement captured "It is Now Tomorrow": Strand's photo showed television antennas atop New York City.

On January 17, 1949, Strand signed in support of Communist Party leaders (Benjamin J. Davis Jr., Eugene Dennis, William Z. Foster, John Gates, Gil Green (politician), Gus Hall, Irving Potash, Jack Stachel, Robert G. Thompson, John Williamson, Henry Winston, Carl Winter) in the Smith Act trials, along with Lester Cole, Martha Dodd, W. E. B. Du Bois, Henry Pratt Fairchild, Howard Fast, Shirley Graham, Robert Gwathmey, E.Y. Harburg, Joseph H. Levy, Albert Maltz, Philip Morrison, Clarence Parker, Muriel Rukeyser, Alfred K. Stern (husband of Martha Dodd), Max Weber, and Henry Wilcox.

=== Later years in Europe ===
The Family, from Un Paese (1955)

In June 1949, Strand left the United States to present Native Land at the Karlovy Vary International Film Festival in Czechoslovakia. The remaining 27 years of his life were spent in Orgeval, France, where, despite never learning the language, he maintained an impressive, creative life, assisted by his third wife, fellow photographer Hazel Kingsbury Strand.

Although Strand is best known for his early abstractions, his return to still photography in this later period produced some of his most significant work in the form of six book "portraits" of place: Time in New England (1950), La France de Profil (1952), Un Paese (featuring photographs of Luzzara and the Po River Valley in Italy, Einaudi, 1955), Tir a'Mhurain / Outer Hebrides (1962), Living Egypt (1969, with James Aldridge) and Ghana: An African Portrait (with commentary by Basil Davidson; 1976).

== Personal life ==
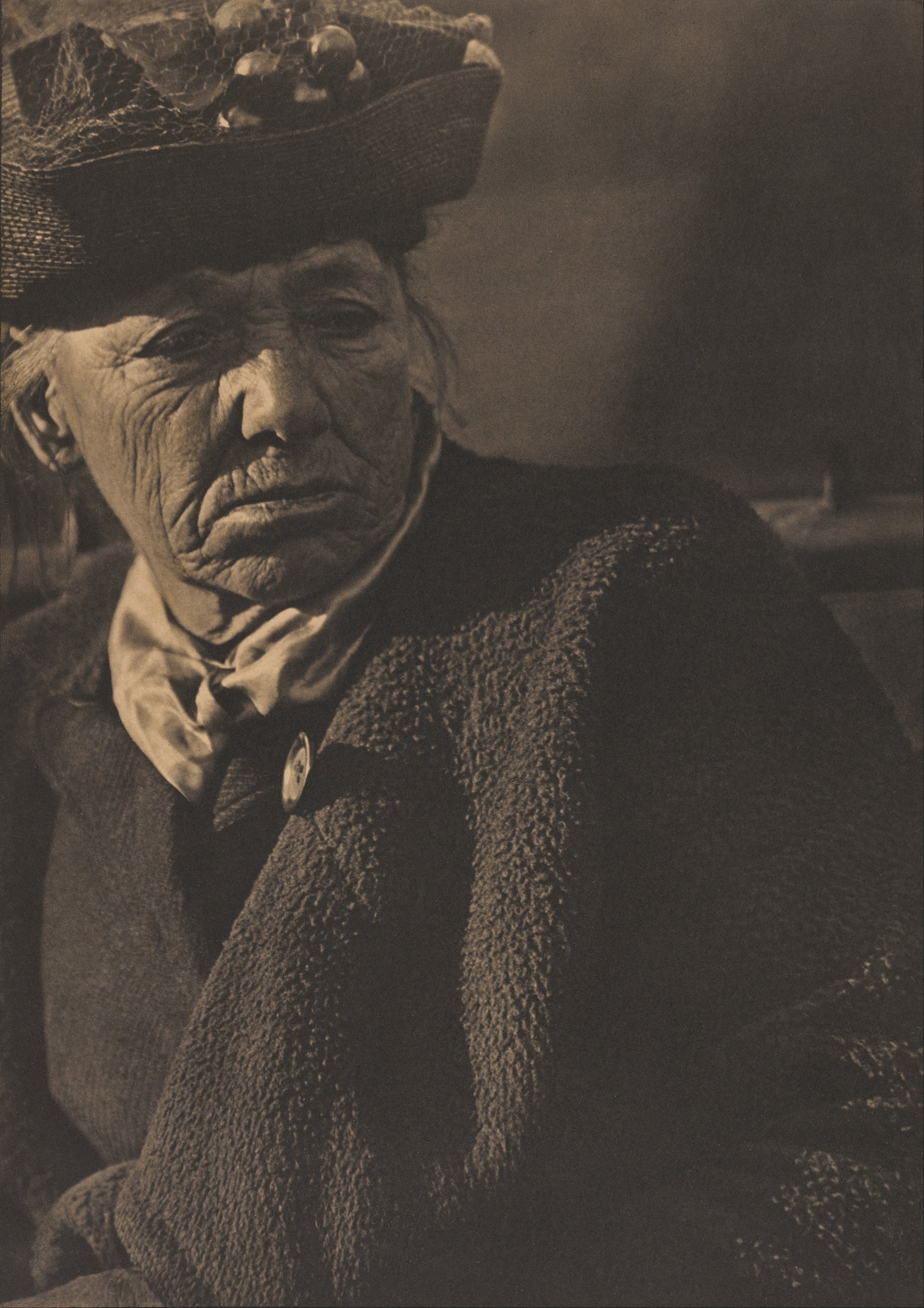
Portrait, Washington Square Park (1917)

Strand married the painter Rebecca Salsbury on January 21, 1922. He photographed her frequently, sometimes in unusually intimate, closely cropped compositions. Following their divorce in 1933, Strand met Virginia Stevens and married her in 1936. They divorced in 1950. He married Hazel Kingsbury in 1951 and they remained married until his death in 1976."

The timing of Strand's departure to France is coincident with the first libel trial of his friend Alger Hiss, with whom he maintained a correspondence until his death. Although he was never officially a member of the Communist Party, many of Strand's collaborators were either Party members (James Aldridge; Cesare Zavattini) or prominent left-leaning writers and activists (Basil Davidson). Many of his friends were also Communists or suspected of being so (Member of Parliament D. N. Pritt; film director Joseph Losey; Scottish poet Hugh MacDiarmid; actor Alex McCrindle). Strand was also closely involved with Frontier Films, one of more than 20 organizations that were identified as "subversive" and "un-American" by the US Attorney General. When he was asked by an interviewer why he decided to go to France, Strand began by noting that in America, at the time of his departure, "McCarthyism was becoming rife and poisoning the minds of an awful lot of people."

During the 1950s, and owing to a printing process that was reportedly only available in that country at the time, Strand insisted that his books be printed in Leipzig, East Germany, even if it meant they were initially banned in the American market on account of their Communist provenance. Following Strand's move to Europe, it was later revealed in de-classified intelligence files, obtained under the Freedom of Information Act and now preserved at the Center for Creative Photography at the University of Arizona, that he was closely monitored by security services.

== Legacy ==
In 1984 Strand was posthumously inducted into the International Photography Hall of Fame and Museum.

The highest price reached by a Strand photograph in the art market was by Akeley Motion Picture Camera (1922), who sold by $783,750 at Christie's New York, on 4 April 2013.

== Publications ==
- Time in New England (1950)
- La France de Profil (1952)
- Un Paese (1955)
- Tir a'Mhurain / Outer Hebrides (1962)
- Living Egypt (1969), with James Aldridge
- Ghana: An African Portrait (1976), with commentary by Basil Davidson

== Film ==
- Manhatta (1921; with Charles Sheeler), "considered to be the first American avant-garde film"

== Exhibitions ==
- Paul Strand: Photographs 1915–1945, Museum of Modern Art, New York, 1945
- Stieglitz, Steichen, Strand, the Metropolitan Museum of Art, 2010
- Paul Strand: Photography and Film for the 20th Century, Philadelphia Museum of Art, Philadelphia, Pennsylvania, 2014; Victoria and Albert Museum, London, 2016; Fundación Mapfre, Madrid, 2020–21
- Paul Strand: The Balance of Forces, Fondation Henri Cartier-Bresson, Paris, 2023

== Public collections ==
- The Art Institute of Chicago
- The Cleveland Museum of Art
- Dallas Museum of Art
- J. Paul Getty Museum, Los Angeles
- Los Angeles County Museum of Art
- Philadelphia Museum of Art
- Princeton University Art Museum
- Metropolitan Museum of Art, New York
- Moderna Museet, Stockholm
- Musée d'Orsay, Paris
- Museum of Fine Arts, Houston
- Museum of Modern Art, New York, 39 prints (as of 8 January 2022)
- National Gallery of Art, Washington, D.C.
- National Galleries of Scotland, Edinburgh
- National Gallery of Victoria, Melbourne
- San Francisco Museum of Modern Art
- Saint Louis Art Museum
- Smithsonian Museum of American Art, Washington, D.C.
- Victoria and Albert Museum, London
- Whitney Museum of American Art, New York, 9 prints (as of 11 January 2022)
