= Manhatta =

1922 film

- Directed by: Charles Sheeler; Paul Strand
- Release date: 1921
- Running time: 10 minutes
- Country: United States
- Languages: Silent film English intertitles

Full film

Manhatta (1921) is a short documentary film directed by painter Charles Sheeler and photographer Paul Strand.

== Production background ==
Manhatta documents the early 20th-century look of Manhattan. With the city as subject, the film consists of 65 shots sequenced in a loose non-narrative structure, beginning with the Staten Island ferry approaching Manhattan and concludes with a sunset view from a skyscraper. Often considered by some to be the first American avant-garde film, its primary objective is to explore the relationship between photography and film. Camera movement is kept to a minimum, as is incidental motion within each shot. Each frame provides a view of the city that has been carefully arranged into abstract compositions, capturing the rhythmic patterns of the emerging metropolis.

Manhatta was a collaboration between painter/photographer Charles Sheeler and photographer Paul Strand. The film features intertitles that include excerpts from the writings of Walt Whitman.

== Preservation status ==
In 1995, the film was selected for preservation in the National Film Registry by the Library of Congress, being deemed "culturally, historically, or aesthetically significant". Restoration proved difficult, as the negative was lost, and only a single, heavily damaged 35mm print remained in existence. It was restored for the DVD set Unseen Cinema in October 2005. The film was completely restored in January 2009 by archivist Bruce Posner, in collaboration with film restoration company Lowry Digital. Posner spent close to four years returning the film to its original glory. The Museum of Modern Art and Anthology Film Archives also commissioned a new score from New York composer Donald Sosin.

== The Film's Poem ==
City of the world

(for all races are here)

City of tall facades

of marble and iron,

Proud and passionate city.

When million-footed Manhattan

unpent, descends

to its pavements.

High growth of Iron,

slender, strong,

splendidly uprising

toward clear skies.

The building of cities,

- the shovel, the great derrick,

the walls scaffold, the work

of walls and ceilings.

Where our tall topt

marble and iron beauties

range on opposite sides.

City of hurried and sparkling waters,

city nested in bays.

With lines of steamships

threading every sea.

On the river the shadowy group,

the big steam tug

closely flank'd on each side

by barges.

Gorgeous clouds of sunset!

drench with your splendor

me or the men and women

generations after me.

== See also ==
- Rien que les heures (1926)
- Berlin: Symphony of a Metropolis (1927)
- Man With a Movie Camera (1929)
