= Musya S. Sheeler =

Russian-American artist (1908–1981)

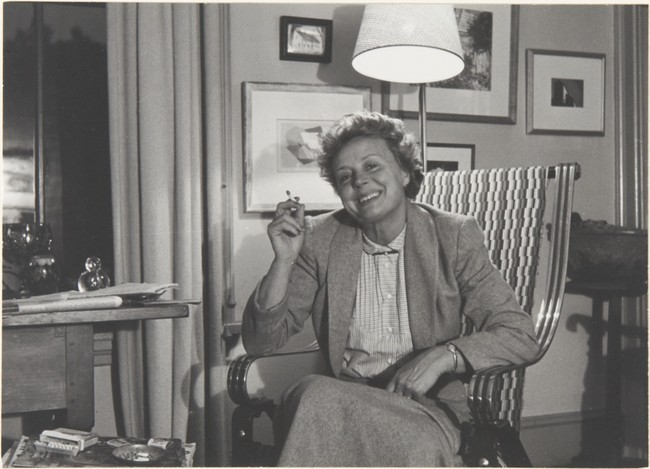
- Portrait of Muysa Sheeler
- Born: Musya Metas Sokolova; 1908; Russia
- Died: 1981 (aged 72–73); Dobbs Ferry, New York, US
- Resting place: Sleepy Hollow Cemetery, Sleepy Hollow, New York
- Known for: Modern art, photography
- Notable work: Nuns at Play, New England Heritage, Still Life With Thorn Cactus
- Movement: Precisionism, American Modernism
- Spouse: Charles Sheeler (m. 1939)

Musya S. Sheeler (1908 – 1981), born Musya Metas Sokolova, was a Russian dancer who, at the age of 15, fled with her family from the Russian Revolution to the United States, where she became a photographer. Her work was exhibited at the Museum of Modern Art (MoMA) three times and featured in magazines including Life and Vogue.

== Biography ==
On April 2, 1939, Musya Metas Sokolova married Charles Sheeler, one of America's leading modernists, becoming his second wife six years after the death in 1933 of Sheeler's first wife Katharine Baird Shaffer. In 1942, Sheeler joined the Metropolitan Museum of Art as a senior research fellow in photography, worked on a project in Connecticut with the photographer Edward Weston, and moved with Musya to Irvington-on-Hudson, into the gardener's cottage that was the remaining building on what was the Lowe estate, some thirty-two kilometres north of New York. Sheeler worked for the Metropolitan Museum's Department of Publications from 1942 to 1945, photographing a wide range of works from the collection, including Assyrian reliefs, classical Greek and Roman sculpture, European painting, and Chinese objects.

Sheeler took many pictures of Musya, in the nude in both a black and white (3x4inch) series and in 35mm color slides; other black and white prints show her laughing or leaning out of a window, or—on one occasion—sick in bed. She in turn made portraits of him with his Linhof camera, taking photographs and painting.

A close friend was poet William Carlos Williams who in his writing on ‘projective verse’ explains the theory in terms of the marriage of Charles and Musya Sheeler. A 1949 portrait by Musya shows Williams with a dog in dappled shade, Williams leaning from his chair to pet the dog and in that moment, both have their eyes closed as if in ecstatic contemplation. Ansel Adams described his coming to New York to be welcomed by Musya, whom he described as “a vibrant Russian: a former ballet dancer who had an abundance of affection for their friends.” Charles and Musya traded photographs for the pottery of their friends Mary and Edwin Scheier, whose marriage was nearly contemporary with theirs and as creatively abundant. The Scheiers’ photographs by Charles and by Musya Sheeler are now in the Currier Gallery of Art. Through Williams, Charles and Musya knew professor of English John C. Thirlwall. Edward and Charis Weston visited them in 1942, Frederick Sommer in 1944, and also, as befitting Musya's interest in dance, Martha Graham and Barbara Morgan. In 1946 Bartlett H. Hayes Jr., an educator and art historian and director of the Addison Gallery of American Art at Phillips Academy in Andover invited the couple to be artists-in-residence in an early instance of such programs.

== Recognition ==
In 1950, Musya exhibited with Ansel Adams, Edward Weston and Brett Weston, and Charles Sheeler in Plants and Plant Forms in Photography arranged by Victor Salvatore, and also that year made flashlit photographs of Edward Steichen, curator of Photography at MoMA, Sheeler and painter John Marin toasting each other with tumblers of whisky at the Sheeler house Steichen included her that year in Photographs by 51 Photographers, August 1–September 17, 1950, at the Museum.

In 1949, Musya had realized an ambition to make a series of portraits of nuns. Visiting a convent in Tarrytown, N.Y., she found an opportunity to make more than portraits and to exploit her particular interest in figurative imagery that later was to catch the eye of editors at Condé Nast. The result was ‘Nuns at Play’, a Life magazine essay on the religious novices in moments of relaxation from their training as teachers. One of the photographs shows the nuns, veils and habits flying, gleefully riding a schoolyard merry-go-round. Steichen selected it for the world-touring 1955 Museum of Modern Art exhibition The Family of Man, seen by 9 million visitors. For Vogue, in 1951, with journalist Edna Woolman Chase, Musya produced a slower-paced photoessay on a sleepy, conservative rural hamlet; classically illuminated with the available light, the series illustrates the timeless traditions and attitudes of small-town life.

Musya's Pool (1950) was included by subsequent curator of photography John Szarkowski in a third MoMA show, From the McAlpin Collection, December 14, 1966 – February 12, 1967.

== Late career ==
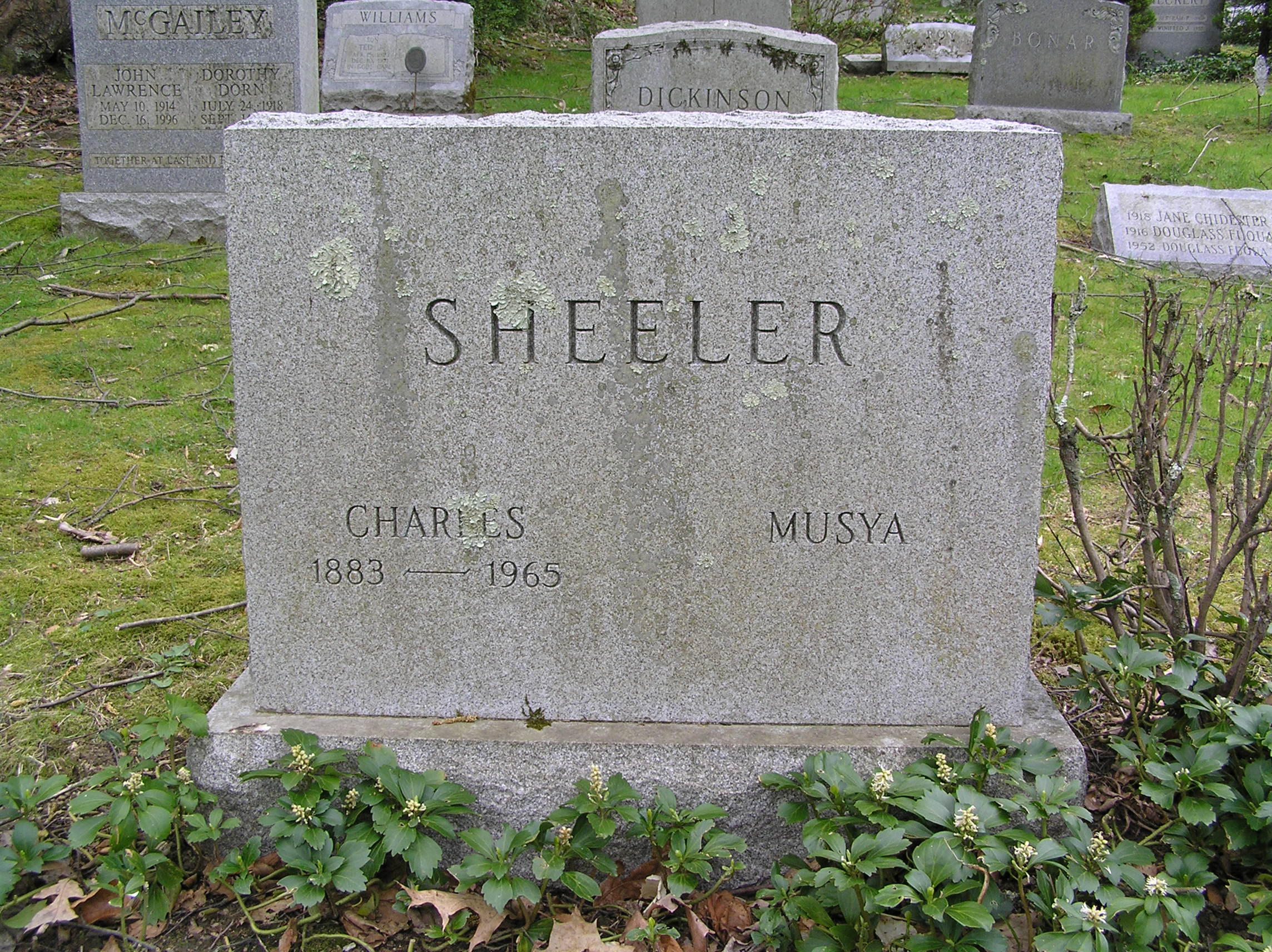
The monument of Charles Sheeler and Musya in Sleepy Hollow Cemetery

Despite her successes, Musya's career trajectory was clearly affected when Sheeler suffered a debilitating stroke in 1959 and died on May 7, 1965, in Dobbs Ferry, New York.

== Collections ==
- Clervaux Castle, Luxembourg holds Nuns on Merry-Go-Round (1949)
- Center for Creative Photography, The University of Arizona, holds Fishing nets on boat, skyline (1949) and Stacked quarried rock slabs, snow, bare tree (1950)
- The Los Angeles County Museum of Art holds Still Life With Thorn Cactus (1949)
- The Currier Gallery of Art holds three of Musya Sheeler's portraits of Mary and Edwin Scheier (1948)
- The National Gallery of Canada holds New England Heritage (c. 1965)
