= Sheller =

Sheller is a surname. Notable people with the surname include:

- Alexander Sheller (1838–1900), Russian writer
- Marty Sheller (born 1940), American jazz trumpeter and arranger
- Mimi Sheller (born 1967), American sociologist
- William Sheller (born 1946), French classical composer and singer

== See also ==
- 29614 Sheller, a main-belt asteroid
- Clara Sheller, a French television series
