= 1888 in animation =

Events in 1888 in animation.

== Events ==
- December 1: Charles-Émile Reynaud files a patent for his animated moving picture system Théâtre Optique. The patent was issued on 14 January 1889. Reynaud in the 1888 patent: "The aim of the apparatus is to obtain the illusion of motion, which is no longer limited to the repetition of the same poses at each turn of the instrument, as is necessary in all known apparatus (Zootropes, Praxinoscopes, etc.), but Having, on the contrary, an indefinite variety and duration, and thus producing real scenes animated by unlimited development. Hence the name of Optical Theater given by the inventor to this apparatus" (translated from French).
- Date uncertain - Charles-Émile Reynaud creates the animated film Un bon bock (A Good Beer). It consisted of 700 individually painted 6 x 6 cm pictures in a 50 meter long flexible strip. Reynaud manipulated the speed and repeated movements by moving the film back and forth through the projector to tell a visual story that lasted close to fifteen minutes. The film would not be exhibited to the public until 1892.

== Births ==
=== January ===
- January 22: Win Smith, Canadian-American animator and comics artist (Penguin Pete, Looney Luke, Mickey Mouse, Looney Tunes), (d. 1941).

=== February ===
- February 1: Manuel Urda Marín, Spanish comics artist and animator, (d. 1974).

=== March ===
- March 3: Seitarō Kitayama, Japanese animation director, credited with the first examples of commercial production of anime, (directed animated adaptations of The Crab and the Monkey, Urashima Tarō, and Momotarō), (d. 1945).
- March 12: Hall Johnson, American composer and choirmaster (voice of the Deacon Crow in Dumbo), (d. 1970).

=== April ===
- April 6: Hans Richter, German film producer of animated films, painter, graphic artist, and art historian (pioneer of abstract animation, directed the animated short films Rhythmus 21, and Ghosts Before Breakfast), (d. 1976).
- April 17: Gwen Williams, American actress (voice of Mary in Mr. Bug Goes to Town), (d. 1962).

=== September ===
- September 12: Maurice Chevalier, French actor and singer (sang the title song in The Aristocats), (d. 1972).

=== October ===
- October 3: Claud Allister, English actor (voice of Sir Giles in The Reluctant Dragon, and Mr. Rat in The Adventures of Ichabod and Mr. Toad), (d. 1970).

=== December ===
- December 24: Yuri Zhelyabuzhsky, Russian animator, cinematographer, film director, and screenwriter, (directed The Skating Rink, one of the first traditionally animated Soviet cartoons, and Bolvashka's Adventures, the first Soviet short film that combined live-action and stop motion animation), (d. 1955).

== Sources ==
- Bendazzi, Giannalberto (1994). Cartoons: One hundred years of cinema animation. Indiana University Press. ISBN 0253209374.
- Rossell, Deac (1995). "A Chronology of Cinema, 1889-1896". Film History. 7 (2). Indiana University Press: 115–236. JSTOR 3815166.
- Derek Spring & Richard Taylor. Stalinism and Soviet Cinema. Routledge, 2013.
