= Opus IV (film) =

1925 film

- Directed by: Walter Ruttmann
- Release date: 1925
- Running time: 4 minutes
- Country: Germany
- Language: Silent

Opus IV is a 1925 German absolute film directed by Walter Ruttmann. The film is approximately 3m 55s in length. It uses abstract animation.

The film is the final installment in the “Lichtspiel” (German for “light show”). The Opus films are famous for using geometric shapes, basic lines, and abstraction to create optical images, then taking the optical art, along with rhythm and editing, to imply movement. Along with the Film Ist Rhythm series, the Lichtspiel film series is one of the earliest examples of absolute film. Those films contain a stronger resemblance to paintings than their other Absolute counterparts.

== Release ==
Opus IV (1925)

On 3 May 1925 the Sunday matinee program Der absolute Film took place in the UFA-Palast theater at the Kurfurstendamm in Berlin. Its 900 seats soon sold out and the program was repeated a week later. Viking Eggeling's Symphonie diagonale, Hans Richter's Rhythmus 21 and Rhythmus 23, Walter Ruttmann's Opus II, Opus III and Opus IV were all shown publicly for the first time in Germany, along with the two French dadaist cinéma pur films Ballet Mécanique and René Clair's Entr'acte, and Ludwig Hirschfeld-Mack's performance with a type of color organ. Eggeling happened to die a few days later.
