= Ré Soupault =

French-German photographer, fashion designer and author

- Born: Meta Erna Niemeyer; 29 October 1901; Bublitz, German Empire
- Died: 12 March 1996 (aged 94); Paris, France
- Education: Bauhaus
- Known for: photography, fashion designer, translations
- Movement: Avant Garde
- Spouse(s): Married in 1926, divorced in 1931: Hans Richter, married in 1937: Philippe Soupault

Ré Soupault (29 October 1901 – 12 March 1996) born known as Meta Erna Niemeyer, was a French-German artist, educated at the Bauhaus. She is known for a diversity of artistic works as a photographer, fashion designer, and also as translator.

== Education and early life ==
She was born in Pommerania in the then German town (present-day Polish) of Bublitz in 1901. In 1921, she began to study at the Bauhaus in Weimar. There, she became influenced by Johannes Itten, whose colours and shape theory would influence her early work. Soupault was impressed by the Neo-Zoroastrian Mazdaznanism, according to which Itten and other Bauhaus members lived, and studied Sanskrit for two semesters at Jena university. In the Bauhaus, Erna became known as Ré, as Kurt Schwitters and the photographer Otto Umbehr used to call her.

== Career ==
=== Berlin ===
During a visit to Berlin, she met the former Bauhaus member Werner Graeff, who introduced her to the Swedish experimental filmmaker Viking Eggeling. After her participation in the first major Bauhaus exhibition in Weimar in 1923, Niemeyer became Eggeling's assistant. She was fascinated by Eggeling's enthusiasm and finished the film “Diagonal Symphony” for the sick filmmaker within a year. With Schwitters, she developed a close working relationship and together they moved to Hanover. As the Bauhaus moved to Dessau in 1925 and developed a more functional design, she decided not to return and to settle in Berlin instead.

=== Paris ===
Having begun to write under the pen name "Greta Green" for the Sport im Bild magazine in Germany, she moved to Paris as a correspondent for the Scherl Verlag in 1929. She quickly established herself in avant-gardist circles in Montparnasse where artists met in the Café Dôme. At a birthday party for Kiki de Montparnasse, she got to know the millionaire Arthur Wheeler, with whom she opened the fashion boutique Ré Sport in 1931. She had designed fashion before, like modern culottes for the Parisian Paul Poiret. Later, she designed and sold "rational clothing for the working woman", and some of her collections were photographed by Man Ray. When Wheeler died in 1934, she had to close the fashion studio. In 1933, she got to know her second husband Phillippe Soupault, a French poet and journalist. With him, she travelled through Europe and took photographs for his reports.

=== Tunis ===
Between 1938 and 1943, the couple lived in Tunisia, where Phillippe Soupault established the anti-Fascist Radio Tunis, speaking out against the Italian Radio Bari. Working as a freelance photographer in Tunis, Ré Soupault published reportages for numerous magazines from August 1938 onwards. She photographed emigrants, pilgrims, nomads and in the palace of the Tunisian monarch, and also took self-portraits. The French government acquired photographs of her for little money.

She began to be interested in the role of women in a Muslim country and learnt about the existence of the "Quartier réservé" in Tunis. This was a closed district to which women who had been rejected by their families and society were deported and where prostitution was their only source of income. Ré Soupault's good relations with the authorities allowed her access to this neighbourhood for two days, accompanied by a local policeman. She took portraits of women in almost empty rooms and captured their gazes. These were the only photos ever taken there and were later published in the book Ré Soupault – Die Fotografin der magischen Sekunde.

== Personal life ==
At the Bauhaus, she got to know her first husband Hans Richter in 1922 with whom she got married in 1926. The couple befriended architect Mies van der Rohe, painter Fernand Leger and composer Paul Hindemith amongst others. In 1927, the marriage with Richter broke and by 1931 they divorced. Her second husband was Phillippe Soupault, who she got to know at a reception at the Russian Embassy in Paris in November 1933 and married in 1937.

Following the arrest of Phillippe in March 1942 by German troops in Tunis, they fled to New York in 1943. In the following years, the couple travelled through South America for the Agence France-Press. After their return to the United States, Ré and Phillippe Souplault separated, and he returned to Paris.

== Later life ==
Having returned to Paris in 1955, she began to work as a translator and in 1948, she was commissioned by the German publisher Büchergilde Gutenberg to translate the diaries of the French author Romain Rolland. Further, she translated the collected works of Comte de Lautrémont. She stayed in contact with Phillipp Soupault, with whom she jointly produced a film about painter Wassily Kandinsky in 1967. In 1973, Phillippe and Ré decided to live together again. This time, each in their own apartment, but in the same house. Phillippe Soupault died in 1990.

== Legacy ==
The German publisher Manfred Metzner, a friend and the executor of Ré Soupault's will, initiated the artist's late discovery by publishing several books in German about her work as a photographer, translator and essayist.

In 2007, the Gropius Bau in Berlin dedicated the first retrospective of her photographic work to Ré Soupault. In 2011, the Kunsthalle Mannheim presented her life's work as a fashion designer and filmmaker, photographer, essayist and translator in an exhibition titled "Ré Soupault. Artist at the Centre of the Avant-garde." In addition to her own photographic works, a photo series by Man Ray was shown, in which he portrayed Soupault and her fashion creations.

== Selected works ==
=== Photographs ===
- Ré Soupault. Künstlerin im Zentrum der Avantgarde, Manfred Metzner (ed.), Das Wunderhorn, Heidelberg, 2011 ISBN 978-3-88423-363-4
- Die Fotografin der magischen Sekunde, Manfred Metzner (ed.), Das Wunderhorn, Heidelberg, 2007 ISBN 978-3-88423-282-8.
- Philippe Soupault. Portraits Fotografien 1934-1944, Manfred Metzner (ed.), Das Wunderhorn, Heidelberg, 2003 ISBN 978-3-88423-217-0.
- Frauenportraits aus dem « Quartier réservé » in Tunis, Manfred Metzner (ed.), Das Wunderhorn, Heidelberg, 2001 ISBN 978-3-88423-140-1.
- Ré Soupault. Photographies 1934-1952, Manfred Metzner (ed.), Goethe Institut Inter Nationes e.V., Munich, 2001.
- Tunisie 1936-1940, with a preface by Abdelwahab Meddeb, bilingual edition French/German, Manfred Metzner (ed.), Das Wunderhorn, Heidelberg, 1996 ISBN 978-3-88423-102-9.
- Paris 1934-1938, Manfred Metzner (ed.), Das Wunderhorn, Heidelberg, 1994, ISBN 978-3-88423-088-6.
