= Constructivist International =

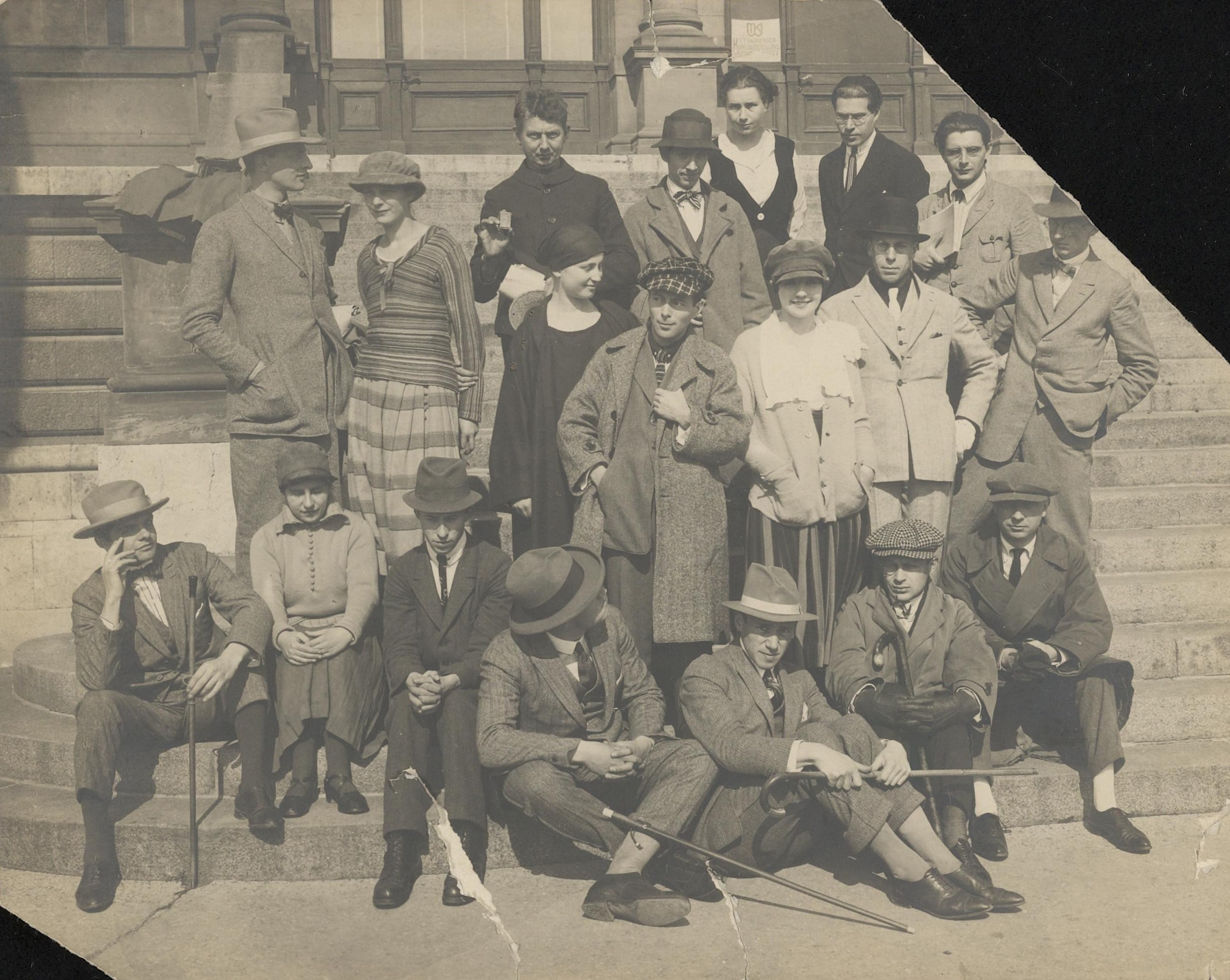
International Congress of Constructivists and Dadaists, Weimar, 25 September 1922. From left to right: front row: Werner Graeff, Nini Smith, Harry Scheibe, Cornelis van Eesteren, Hans Richter, Tristan Tzara, Jean Arp, middle row: Alexa Röhl, El Lissitzky, Nelly and Theo van Doesburg, Bernhard Sturtzkopf, back row: Max and Lotte Burchartz, Karl Peter Röhl, Hans Vogel, Lucia and László Moholy-Nagy and Alfréd Kemény.

Constructivist International (German: Konstruktivistische Internationale, KI) was an international organisation made up of avant-garde artists established in 1922 in order to co-ordinate the work of constructivist artists as an international collective style.

== The International Constructivist Faction ==
The concept of the Constructivist International was first proposed at the International Congress of Progressive Artists, held in Düsseldorf, 29-31 May 1922. A few days prior to the Congress, the key actors involved in launching the KI, met together in Weimar: Theo van Doesburg, El Lissitzky, Hans Richter, Werner Graeff, Karl Peter Röhl and Cornelis van Eesteren. Although they did not develop a unified position, they did develop a shared view on organising avant-garde artists internationally in the interests of social transformation rather than simply aesthetic issues or the pragmatic issues of organising exhibitions, music festivals etc.

During the first day, the Young Rhineland group presented their proposed proclamation, creating some dissent when they suggested that those who did not want to sign it should leave the congress.
