= Walter Ruttmann =

German film director and cinematographer

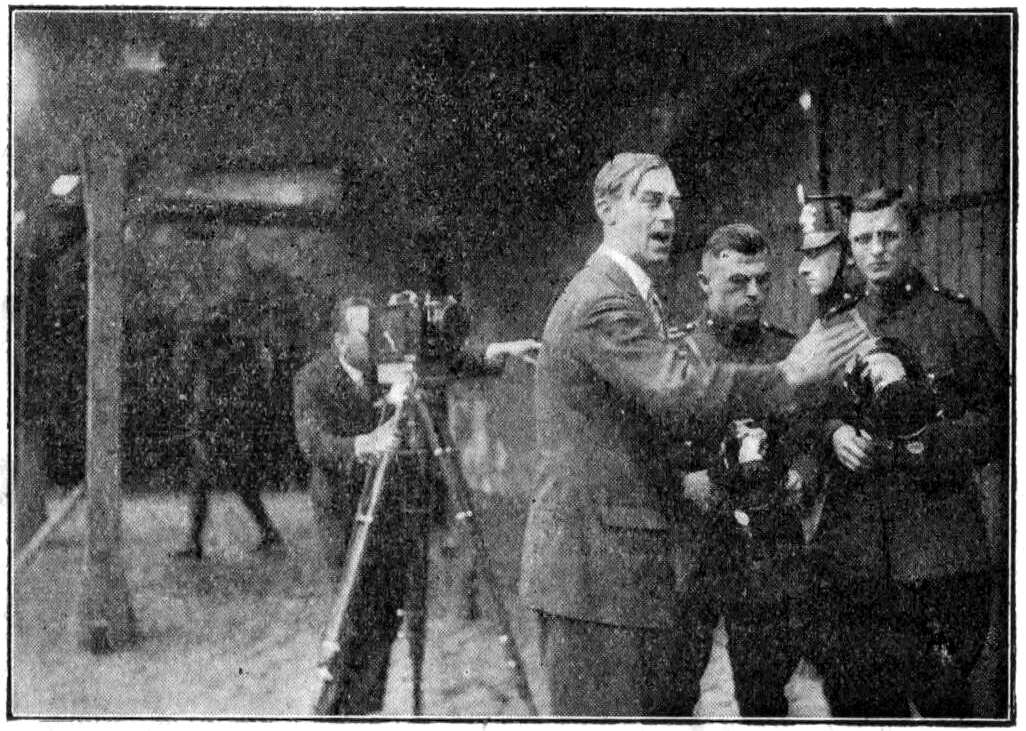
- Walter Ruttman at recording Berlin-Movie, 1928
- Born: 28 December 1887; Frankfurt am Main, German Empire
- Died: 15 July 1941 (aged 53); Berlin, Nazi Germany
- Occupation: Film director
- Years active: 1921–1941
- Notable work: Berlin: Die Sinfonie der Großstadt
- Spouse(s): Erna Treidel (worked in film), later Christel Witthalm
- Children: Thomas Ruttmann, Eva Riehl

Walter Ruttmann (28 December 1887 – 15 July 1941) was a German cinematographer and film director, an important German abstract experimental film maker, along with Hans Richter, Viking Eggeling and Oskar Fischinger. He is best known for directing the semi-documentary 'city symphony' silent film, with orchestral score by Edmund Meisel, in 1927, Berlin: Symphony of a Metropolis. His audio montage Wochenende (Weekend) (1930) is considered a major contribution in the development of sound collages and audio plays.

== Biography ==
Ruttmann was born in Frankfurt am Main, the son of a wealthy mercantilist. He graduated from high school in 1905 and began architectural studies in Zürich in 1907. In 1909 Ruttmann began painting in Munich, where he befriended Paul Klee and Lyonel Feininger, and he would later paint in Marburg.

Ruttmann was conscripted into the army in 1913, first serving in Darmstadt, and shortly after the outbreak of World War I he was sent to the Eastern Front, where he served as an artillery lieutenant and a gas defense officer. After spending 1917 in a hospital for post traumatic stress disorder, he began making films. Ruttmann had the financial means to work independently of the major German studios of the time. He founded Ruttmann-Film GmbH in Munich and patented an animation table, in June 1920.

His first productions were the first fully animated German cartoons and abstract animated films. Lichtspiel: Opus I, produced between 1919 and 1921, premiered on 27 April 1921 at the Berlin Marmorhaus, and released for German theatrical distribution in 1922, is the "oldest fully abstract motion picture known to survive, using only animated geometric forms, arranged and shown without reference to any representational imagery".

Lichtspiel Opus I (1921)

Lichtspiel Opus II (1922)

Opus I and Opus II, were experiments with new forms of film expression, and the influence of these early abstract films can be seen in some of the early work of Oskar Fischinger. Ruttmann and his colleagues of the avant garde movement enriched the language of film as a medium with new formal techniques.

In 1926 he worked with Julius Pinschewer on Der Aufsteig, an experimental film advertising the GeSoLei trade fair in Düsseldorf.

In 1926, Ruttmann licensed a Wax Slicing machine from Oskar Fischinger to create special effects for The Adventures of Prince Achmed, an animated fairy tale film, for Lotte Reiniger, making the moving backgrounds and magic scenes.

Ruttmann was a prominent exponent of both avant-garde art and music. His early abstractions played at the 1929 Baden-Baden Festival to international acclaim despite their being almost eight years old. Together with Erwin Piscator, he worked on the film Melody of the World (1929), though he is best remembered for Berlin: Die Sinfonie der Großstadt (Berlin: Symphony of a Metropolis, 1927).

Weekend (Wochenende), commissioned in 1928 by Berlin Radio Hour, and presented on 13 June 1930, is a pioneering work of musique concrète, a montage of sound clips, recorded using film optical sound track from the Tri-Ergon process. Ruttmann recorded the streets sounds of Berlin with a camera, but without images, this was before magnetic tape. Hans Richter called it “a symphony of sound, speech-fragments, and silence woven into a poem.”

A pacifist, he traveled to Moscow in 1928 and 1929. During the Nazi period he was replaced by Leni Riefenstahl as director of the documentary which eventually became Triumph of the Will (1935), supposedly because Ruttmann's editing style was considered too "Marxist" and Soviet influenced. He died in Berlin 15 July 1941 due to complications following an embolism.

== Culture and Media ==
Segments from Ruttmann's experimental films Lichtspiel: Opus II (1923) and Lichtspiel: Opus IV (1925) are used in the credits of the German neo-noir television series Babylon Berlin.

== Select filmography ==
Lichtspiel Opus III (1924)

Lichtspiel Opus IV (1925)

- Lichtspiel: Opus I (1920)
- Lichtspiel: Opus II (1921)
- Der Sieger (1922)
- Das Wunder (1922)
- Lichtspiel: Opus III (1924, with Lore Leudesdorff)
- Lichtspiel: Opus IV (1925, with Lore Leudesdorff)
- Das wiedergefundene Paradies (1925)
- Der Aufstieg (1926)
- Spiel der Wellen (1926)
- Dort wo der Rhein... (1927)
- Berlin: Die Sinfonie der Großstadt (1927)
- Melody of the World (Melodie der Welt) (1929)
- Wochenende (1930) [an experimental film with sound only, no image]
- Feind im Blut (1931)
- In der Nacht (1931)
- Steel (1933)
- Blut und Boden - Grundlagen zum neuen Reich
- Altgermanische Bauernkultur (1934)
- Metall des Himmels (1935)
- Schiff in Not (1936)
- Mannesmann (1937)
- Henkel, ein deutsches Werk in seiner Arbeit (1938)
- Waffenkammern Deutschlands (1940)
- Deutsche Panzer (1940)
- Krebs (1941)
