= Opus IV =

Opus IV may refer to:

- Opus IV (album), a 1996 album by Abigor
- Opus IV (film), a 1925 film
