= Blut und Boden – Grundlagen zum neuen Reich =

1933 film

- Directed by: Walter Ruttmann; Hans von Passavant; Rolf von Sonjevski-Jamrowski
- Written by: Karl Motz; Ernst Th. Bruger
- Cinematography: Hermann Böttger; Heinz-Hermann Schwerdtfeger
- Music by: Willy Geisler
- Production company: Stabsamt des Reichsbauernführers
- Release date: 23 November 1933 (Marmorhaus)
- Running time: 32 min.
- Country: Germany
- Language: German

Blut und Boden – Grundlagen zum neuen Reich (English: Blood and Soil – Foundations for the New Reich) is a 1933 German short propaganda film that illustrates the Nazi concept of "Blood and Soil".

== Plot ==
The film has both dramatic and purely documentary aspects, following a German farming family as they have their farm foreclosed on, are forced to move to the city and eventually return to farming in the German East. The documentary uses both animation and montage to present the case that the German farmer is suffering because alleged Jewish financial interests flood the market with foreign produce, refuse to lend money for the manufacture of farming equipment and foreclose on people's farms.

An unseen narrator encourages viewers to purchase only domestic goods and return to rural agrarian life. The depression-era trend of urbanization is condemned as a path to further poverty, decadence, and sub-replacement fertility. The film ultimately predicts Berlin's population dwindling to 90,000 by 2050, if immigration to the city had been blocked.

== Production ==
In a reversal of perspective, director Walter Ruttmann reuses footage previously used to glamorize metropolitan life in his previous film Berlin: Symphony of a Great City (1927), before the Nazi era.

== Cast ==
- Jakob Sinn as a farmer
- Hertha Scheel as the farmer's wife
- Hans Stock as another farmer
- Carl de Vogt
- Heinz Berghaus

== Bibliography ==
- Garden, Ian (2011). The Third Reich's Celluloid War. Stroud: The History Press. ISBN 978-0-7524-7787-9.
- Jacobs, Steven; Hielscher, Eva; Kinik, Anthony, eds. (2018). The City Symphony Phenomenon: Cinema, Art, and Urban Modernity Between the Wars. Milton: Routledge. ISBN 978-1-317-21557-8.
