= Karl Peter Röhl =

German painter and graphic designer (1890–1975)

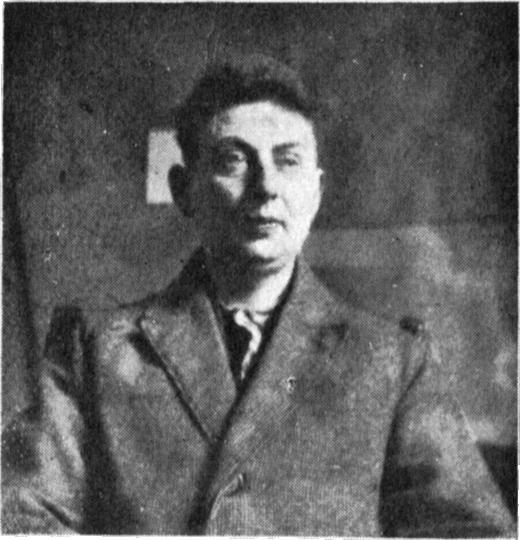
Karl Peter Röhl, in De Stijl, 1927

Karl Peter Röhl (12 September 1890 – 25 November 1975) was a German painter and graphic artist.

== Life and work ==
Born in Kiel, Röhl undertook an apprenticeship as a painter upon leaving school in 1906. He then attended at schools of applied arts in Kiel and Berlin between 1907 and 1911 continuing his studies at the Weimar Saxon Grand Ducal Art School under Walther Klemm and Albin Egger-Lienz. In 1914 he was asked to organize an exhibition by Johannes Molzahn. In the same year, he was drafted into the military and took part in the First World War until 1918.

Röhl returned to Kiel and in 1919 organized the exhibition "Special Exhibition of the Expressionist Working Group Kiel" (Kiel Revolutionary Expressionists) together with Werner Lange and Friedrich Peter Drömmer. Karl Peter Röhl was enrolled as a student at the Bauhaus and went Johannes Itten preliminary lectures during his first semester. He had his own studio which in 1922, provided the venue for Theo van Doesburg’s extra-curricular De Stijl.

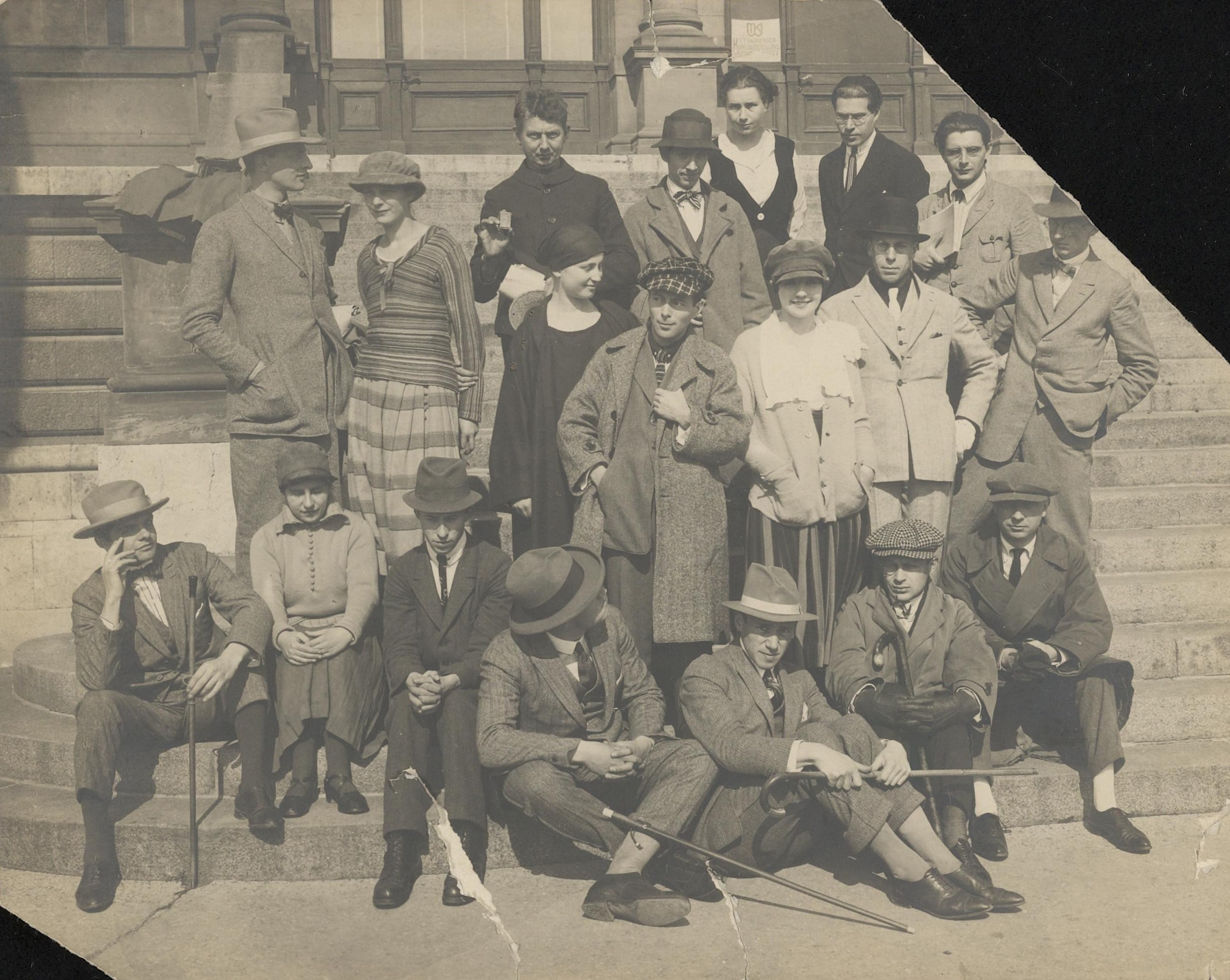
Peter Röhl (above, 3rd from left) as a participant in the Congress of Constructivists and Dadaists in Weimar, September 25, 1922.

At the end of 1919 or in April 2020 he married his fellow student Alexandra Röhl, whom he immediately deregistered from the Bauhaus because of her household duties. In 1920 their son Tülö (1920–1943) was born. The couple separated in 1925. In the same year, Röhl married his second wife Käthe Möbius, with whom he had a daughter, Marinaua.

He joined the Nazi Party in 1933. After his dismissal from teaching in 1942, Röhl was sent to the front as a soldier and was taken prisoner of war. In 1946 he returned to Germany. Until his death in 1975 he worked as a freelance artist in Kiel and taught at the Goetheschule in Kiel between 1952 and 1955.

== Award ==
- 1968: Art Prize of the State of Schleswig-Holstein

== Exhibitions (selection) ==
- 1920 Galerie Goltz, München
- 1932 "Karl Peter Röhl", oil paintings and watercolors, Erfurt Art Association
- 1965 "Karl Peter Röhl", paintings, watercolors, drawings, graphics, State Museum of Art and Cultural History, Schloss Gottorf
- 1975 "Karl Peter Röhl", Galerie Gmurzynska, Zug, Switzerland
- 1999 "Expressionismus in Thüringen", Gallery at the Fish Market and Angermuseum, Erfurt
- 2002 "Karl Peter Röhl. From the cosmic vision to the aesthetics of technology", Bauhaus University, Weimar
- 2002 "Konstruktionen" Paintings 1920–1937, Galerie Berinson, Berlin
- 2004 "Feininger and Klee move", Bauhaus Museum, Weimar
- 2004 "Karl Peter Röhl, Awakening 1947–1952", Haus am Horn, Friends of Bauhaus-Universität Weimar
- 2022: Karl Peter Röhl – Facets of a Bauhaus artist in Kiel, Künstlermuseum Heikendorf
