= October: Ten Days That Shook the World =

1928 film

- Film poster
- Directed by: Grigori Aleksandrov; Sergei Eisenstein
- Written by: Grigori Aleksandrov; Sergei Eisenstein
- Produced by: Arkadiy Alekseyev
- Starring: Vladimir Popov; Vasili Nikandrov; Layaschenko
- Cinematography: Eduard Tisse
- Edited by: Esfir Tobak (Restoration)
- Music by: Edmund Meisel; Dmitri Shostakovich (1966)
- Distributed by: Sovkino
- Release date: 20 January 1928
- Running time: 115 minutes (Original version); 100 minutes (Edited version)
- Country: Soviet Union
- Languages: Silent; Russian (original intertitles)

October: Ten Days That Shook the World; Russian intertitles, with subtitles

October: Ten Days That Shook the World (Russian: Октябрь: Десять дней, которые потрясли мир, romanized: Oktyabr': Desyat' dney kotorye potryasli mir) is a 1928 Soviet silent propaganda film written and directed by Sergei Eisenstein and Grigori Aleksandrov. It is a celebratory dramatization of the 1917 October Revolution commissioned for the tenth anniversary of the event. Originally released in the Soviet Union as October, the film was re-edited and released internationally as Ten Days That Shook The World, after John Reed's popular 1919 book on the Revolution.

== Plot ==
The film opens with the elation after the February Revolution and the establishment of the Provisional Government, depicting the throwing down of the Tsar's monument. It moves quickly to point out it's the "same old story" of war and hunger under the Provisional Government, however. The buildup to the October Revolution is dramatized with intertitles marking the dates of events.

April 1917 Vladimir Lenin returns to Petrograd's Finland railway station packed with supporters.

July 1917 The demonstrations in Nevsky Square are fired upon by the army. The government orders the working class to be cut off from the city center, and in a dramatic sequence the bridges are raised with the bodies of the Bolsheviks still on them as the Bourgeoisie throw copies of the Bolshevik newspaper into the river.

The Bolshevik headquarters also is destroyed by the ruling class, and the Provisional Government orders the arrest of Lenin, who has gone underground but continues to direct the plans for the uprising. Provisional Government leader Alexander Kerensky is mockingly characterized and compared to a mechanical peacock and Napoleon, before satirically being accused of aspiring to the Russian throne.

General Kornilov advances his troops on Petrograd "for God and country." While the government is helpless the Bolsheviks rally to the defense. The Bolsheviks take control of the city's arsenal and General Kornilov is arrested. Leaflets spread the messages of the revolution, and workers are trained to use weapons for the "last and decisive battle."

October 1917 The Bolshevik Committee votes to approve Lenin's proposal to revolt.

24 October Lenin returns to the Smolny after four months in hiding and takes control of the uprising on the eve of the 25th. A message is sent to the people declaring the Provisional Government is deposed as of 25 October at 10 AM.

25 October The cruiser Aurora sails in as the workers take control of the bridges. The Minister of War calls troops to the aid of the deposed government, and Cossacks and the Women's Death Battalion arrive at the Winter Palace and lounge on the Tsar's billiard table. The Provisional Government drafts an appeal to the citizens attempting to reassert its legitimacy, but that evening a congress is held including delegates from all parts of the country and the Soviets are voted into power.

With the weapons and preparations by the Military Revolutionary Committee, Bolsheviks march immediately on the Winter Palace and demand its surrender. The Provisional Government, seemingly aloof, gives no reply. The Women's Death Battalion surrenders and kills their superiors. A group of Soviets infiltrate the vast palace through the cellars and locate the government forces inside. The Cossacks surrender and join the Soviets. At the congress, the Mensheviks appeal for a bloodless end to the conflict, depicted as "harping", falls on deaf ears.

The signal is given by a shot from the Aurora and the assault begins in earnest. In an epic climactic sequence, Soviets storm the palace en masse and overwhelm the defending forces. Soldiers in the palace raid the palace for valuables, only to have their pockets turned out by the Soviets once they have surrendered. Finally, the Soviets beat down the door to the Provisional Government's chambers and arrest the government members. Vladimir Antonov-Ovseyenko drafts a formal statement declaring the Provisional Government deposed. Clocks around the world are shown marking the time of the revolution's success as the Soviets cheer.

26 October The new government sets about building a new state, passing decrees for peace and land.

== Cast ==
- Nikolai Popov — Alexander Kerensky
- Vasili Nikandrov — Vladimir Lenin
- Lyaschenko — Aleksandr Konovalov
- Chibisov — Matvey Skobelev
- Boris Livanov — Mikhail Tereshchenko
- Mikhalev — Nikolai Kishkin
- Nikolai Podvoisky — Bolshevik
- Smelsky — Dmitry Verderevsky
- Eduard Tisse — German Soldier
- Yuri Sazonov — Munist

== Production ==
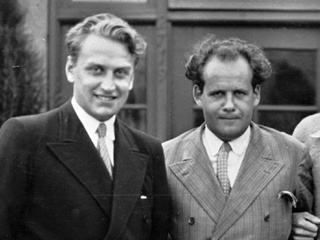
Directors Grigori Aleksandrov (left) and Sergei Eisenstein (right) in 1930

October was one of two films commissioned by the Soviet government to honour the tenth anniversary of the October Revolution (the other was Vsevolod Pudovkin's The End of St. Petersburg). Eisenstein was chosen to head the project due to the international success he had achieved with Battleship Potemkin (1925). Nikolai Podvoisky, one of the troika who led the storming of the Winter Palace, was responsible for the commission. The scene of the storming was based more on The Storming of the Winter Palace (1920), a re-enactment involving Vladimir Lenin and thousands of Red Guards, witnessed by 100,000 spectators, than the original occasion, which was far less photogenic. This scene became the legitimate, historical depiction of the storming of the Winter Palace owing to the lack of print or film documenting the actual event, which led historians and filmmakers to use Eisenstein's recreation. This illustrates October's success as a propaganda film.

According to the memoirs of Alexander Gorodnitsky, his father Moisei described that "in the film October there were almost no professional actors. Lenin, for example was played by Nikandrov, a cement factory worker who had with him a portrait likeness. For him a suit, coat and hat were sewed, and a bald spot was shaved on his head. Likewise a University student took on the role of Kerensky. Zinoviev was played by his real brother, in the role of Trotsky some kind of dentist was employed who also had much in common with the hero".

== Style ==
Eisenstein used the film to further develop his theories of film structure, using a concept he described as "intellectual montage", the editing together of shots of apparently unconnected objects in order to create and encourage intellectual comparisons between them. One of the film's most celebrated examples of this technique is a baroque image of Jesus that is compared, through a series of shots, to Hindu deities, the Buddha, Aztec gods, and finally a primitive idol in order to suggest the sameness of all religions; the idol is then compared with military regalia to suggest the linking of patriotism and religious fervour by the state. In another sequence Alexander Kerensky, head of the pre-Bolshevik revolutionary Provisional Government, is compared to a preening mechanical peacock.

The film simultaneously becomes both a story about History and an integral part of it, in the sense that its editing, its storyboard, its aesthetics are all a pure product of the revolutionary system, both in the sense of putting the revolution on display and in the exalted manner of that display.

— Jean-Claude Conésa

== Soundtrack ==
The original 1928 score was written by composer Edmund Meisel. In 1966, Dmitri Shostakovich wrote a new soundtrack for the film, which later appeared as a tone poem 'October' Op.131 where Shostakovich's famous 'Partisan' theme makes an appearance. Sound effects (such as the shouting of crowds, gunshots, glasses breaking) were added to the film after its initial release by co-director Grigori Aleksandrov. This soundtrack is the one used on most DVD releases of the film.

== Responses ==
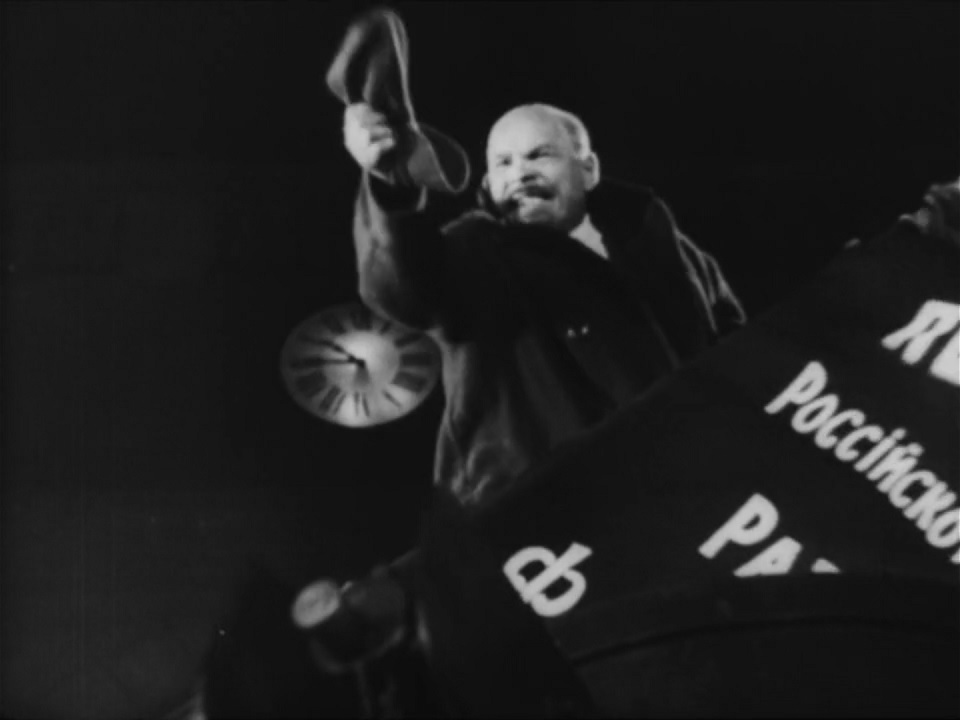
Vladimir Lenin as represented in the film

The film was not as successful or influential in the Soviet Union as Battleship Potemkin.

Among the first spectators of the picture were some who found the film stilted and artificial. Vladimir Mayakovsky said the following about Nikandrov's acting who embodied the character of Lenin in the film:

I take this opportunity, in speaking about films, to protest once more, and in every way, against the portrayal of Lenin by such simulations as Nikandrov's. When a man who resembles Lenin reinforces the resemblance with poses and gestures, one senses in all these superficialities a complete emptiness, a total absence of thought, and it's disgusting to watch it. I heard one comrade put it correctly – that Nikandrov resembled not Lenin but a statue of him.

Eisenstein's montage experiments met with official disapproval; the authorities complained that October was unintelligible to the masses, and Eisenstein was attacked—for neither the first time nor the last—for excessive "formalism". He was also required to re-edit the work to expurgate references to Leon Trotsky, who had recently been purged by Joseph Stalin.

Writing for The Spectator in 1936, Graham Greene gave the film a neutral review. Characterizing the pacing, Greene described it as "restless, excited, [and] crackling with venom", and remarked that the vividness of small impressionistic touches such as the endlessly swinging committee-room door, "telephone bells ringing", and "scared people getting up and proposing resolutions" could only have been properly presented by "one which only a participant would have thought of".

In spite of the film's lack of popular acceptance, film historians consider it to be an immensely rich experience—a sweeping historical epic of vast scale, and a powerful testament to Eisenstein's creativity and artistry. Vsevolod Pudovkin, after viewing the film, remarked, "How I should like to make such a powerful failure."

== See also ==
- Propaganda film
- List of films in the public domain in the United States
