= Edmund Meisel =

Austrian-born composer (1894–1930)

Edmund Meisel (14 August 1894 – 14 November 1930) was an Austrian-born composer. He wrote the score to Walter Ruttmann's Berlin: Symphony of a Metropolis (1927), The Battleship Potemkin (1925), and other films of Sergei Eisenstein. Meisel was one of the more important and pioneering figures in film music. Much of his work and the evidence of his significance was lost for more than fifty years.

== Biography ==
Meisel was born in Vienna to Abraham and Jeni née Herzbrunn. His family was Jewish. He began composing incidental music for the stage in the 1920s. Early credits included the scoring of plays by Bertolt Brecht. His acquaintance with Erwin Piscator led to him writing music for films soon after. Meisel quickly came to be considered a talented composer, capable of working in a different styles, encompassing expressionism and jazz, as well as traditional orchestral modes. Writing during the turbulent years of the Weimar Republic, Meisel demonstrated a wry sense of humor, particularly regarding patriotic songs.

In 1925, Meisel came to prominence with a new score for Sergei Eisenstein's Potemkin, helping to turn the movie into a major hit from the modest success it had had in Russia. The opportunity arose when the German distributor decided to capitalize on the unexpected success the movie achieved in Berlin by improving the score. Meisel's music established an approach to scoring movies that came to dominate filmmaking, especially in Hollywood. Writing in just 12 days' time, his score more closely paralleled the movie, shot-by-shot and scene-by-scene, in a way that was novel for the time. Meisel's only guidance from Eisenstein was with the final reel, where Meisel was asked to rely on rhythm as the dominant element. Eisenstein was apparently pleased with Meisel's score, hiring him later for October in 1927. Quite remarkable is the existence of a sound-on-disc version of Meisel’s score, which he arranged in 1930 with spoken parts (in German), noise and his own music.

Meisel wrote full scores for Arnold Fanck's The Holy Mountain in 1926 and in 1927, was the composer on Berlin: Symphony of a Metropolis, writing a score to be played by an orchestra of 75 musicians. Meisel was so influential, he was sometimes credited simply with his last name. Meisel also wrote articles on film composition and the performance of his scores, a helpful resource for scholars. Although his name was known, Meisel's score to Potemkin was lost, and wasn't reconstructed until the 1990s, leading to renewed interest in his music.

In November 1930, he was working on the score for Arnold Fanck’s film Stürme über dem Mont Blanc when he had to be admitted to a Berlin hospital due to a case of neglected appendicitis. However, the emergency operation he underwent came too late. Edmund Meisel died on 14 November 1930 at the age of 36.

His widow Else went on to marry Ludwig Blattner.

Meisel's niece was the writer and member of the German Resistance, Hilde Meisel.

== Selected filmography ==
- Battleship Potemkin (1925)
- The Holy Mountain (1926)
- Superfluous People (1926)
- Berlin: Symphony of a Metropolis (1927)
- October: Ten Days That Shook the World (1928)
- Deutscher Rundfunk (1928)
- The Crimson Circle (1929)
- The Blue Express (1929)
