= Melody of the World =

1929 film

- Theatrical release poster
- Directed by: Walter Ruttmann
- Written by: Walter Ruttmann
- Produced by: Guido Bagier; Heinrich Mutzenbecher
- Cinematography: Reimar Kuntze; Wilhelm Lehne; Rudolph Rathmann; Paul Holzki
- Edited by: Walter Ruttmann; Erna Hölzel
- Music by: Wolfgang Zeller
- Release dates: 27 July 1929 (Deutsches Kammermusikfest); 10 May 1930
- Running time: 48 minutes
- Country: Germany
- Language: German

Melody of the World (German: Melodie der Welt) is a 1929 German film directed by Walter Ruttmann. It is also known as World Melody. The film is structured like a symphony and consists of documentary footage from all over the world, contrasted and juxtaposed to show a number of human activities as they take form in different cultures. There are also staged scenes with actors.

The film was produced by Tonbild-Syndikat AG as an assignment from Hapag. It has an original score by Wolfgang Zeller. It was advertised as Germany's first feature-length sound film.

== Cast ==
- Ivan Koval-Samborskij as sailor
- Renée Stobrawa as sailor's wife
- Grace Chiang as Japanese woman
- O. Idris as Malayan temple dancer
- Wilhelm Cuno as general director of Hapag

== Release ==
The world premiere took place on 27 July 1929 at the Deutsches Kammermusikfest in Baden-Baden. The film was released in regular German cinemas on 10 May 1930, distributed by Deutsches Lichtspiel-Syndikat AG.

== See also ==
- List of early sound feature films (1926–1929)
