= Symphonie diagonale =

1923 film by Viking Eggeling

- Directed by: Viking Eggeling
- Release date: 1923
- Running time: 7 minutes
- Country: Germany
- Language: Silent

Symphonie diagonale, or Diagonal-Symphonie as its German title was, is a 1923 German film directed by Viking Eggeling.

The title has also been misspelled Symphonie diaganale in the United States.

== Summary ==
The film

A tilted figure, consisting largely of right angles at the beginning, grows by accretion, with the addition of short straight lines and curves which sprout from the existing design. The figure vanishes and the process begins again with a new pattern, each cycle lasting one or two seconds. The complete figures are drawn in a vaguely Art Deco style and could be said to resemble any number of things, an ear, a harp, panpipes, a grand piano with trombones, and so on, only highly stylized. The tone is playful and hypnotic.

== History ==
Eggeling began work on Symphonie diagonale in 1921. Paper cut-outs and tin foil figures were photographed a frame at a time. The Last version was completed in 1923 (it was re-shot 3 times because Eggeling was never satisfied), a version of the film was first shown publicly in 1922 at the V.D.I. in Berlin. The final version of the film was shown in 1925 at the first international avant-garde film show at UFA's theatre Kurfürstendamm in Berlin. The project originated from Eggeling's scroll drawings produced with fellow Dadaist Hans Richter from 1921.

== See also ==
- Cinéma Pur
- Surrealist cinema
