= Berlin: Symphony of a Metropolis =

1927 film

- Directed by: Walter Ruttmann
- Written by: Karl Freund; Carl Mayer; Walter Ruttmann
- Cinematography: Robert Baberske; Reimar Kuntze; László Schäffer; Karl Freund
- Edited by: Walter Ruttmann
- Music by: Edmund Meisel
- Distributed by: Fox Film Corporation (US); Fox Europa (Europe)
- Release dates: 23 September 1927 (Germany); 13 May 1928 (US)
- Running time: 65 minutes
- Country: Weimar Republic
- Language: Silent film

Berlin: Symphony of a Metropolis or Berlin: Symphony of a Great City (German: Berlin: Die Sinfonie der Großstadt) is a 1927 German silent film directed by Walter Ruttmann, co-written by Carl Mayer and Karl Freund. Much of the motion in the film, and many of the scene transitions, are built around the motion of trains and streetcars.

The film is an example of the 'city symphony' film genre. It portrays the life of a city, mainly through visual impressions in a semi-documentary style, without the narrative content of more mainstream films, though the sequencing of events can imply a kind of loose theme or impression of the city's daily life. Other examples of the genre include Charles Sheeler and Paul Strand's Manhatta (1921), Alberto Cavalcanti's Rien que les heures (1926), Andre Sauvage's Etudes sur Paris (1928), Dziga Vertov's Man with a Movie Camera (1929), Adalberto Kemeny's São Paulo, Sinfonia da Metrópole (1929) and Alexandr Hackenschmied's Bezúčelná procházka (1930). The film represented a break from Ruttmann's earlier "absolute films," with influences from Vertov's earlier films apparent in Ruttmann's approach to with Berlin.

The film demonstrates the filmmaker's knowledge of Soviet montage theory, and some socialist political sympathies can be inferred from a few of the edits in the film. Critics, however, have suggested that either Ruttmann avoided a strong position, or that he pursued his aesthetic interests to the extent that they diminished the potential for political content. Ruttmann's own description of the film suggests that his motives were predominantly aesthetic: "Since I began in the cinema, I had the idea of making something out of life, of creating a symphonic film out of the millions of energies that comprise the life of a big city."

What is critically interesting about this particular film shot in Berlin, Germany is the time when it was made: several years before any clear National Socialist influence, and well before Joseph Goebbels' Propaganda Ministry took over all German film production, which stalled creativity and forced many filmmakers to leave the country. Today it is often watched as a filmed time capsule, providing a historical filmed record of the city of Berlin in the mid 1920s. Over 30% of central Berlin was leveled by the end of World War II, which dramatically changed the face of Berlin from that depicted in this film forever. Many places and buildings that did not survive the war appear in the film, such as the Anhalter Bahnhof train station, and the Hotel Excelsior located opposite, once the largest hotel in Europe.

Composer Edmund Meisel was commissioned to write an orchestral score for its original release.

== Production ==
According to Ruttmann, a "hypersensitive film stock" was developed for use in this film, to solve lighting difficulties during night scenes.

== Synopsis ==
Berlin: Symphony of a Metropolis (1927)

Events are arranged to simulate the passage of a single day. Shots and scenes are cut together based on relationships of image, motion, point of view, and thematic content.

At times, a sort of non-narrative commentary can be implied, as in edits that juxtapose workers entering a factory with cattle being beaten and driven into a corral.

The five-reel film is divided into five acts, and each act is announced through a title card at the beginning and end.

=== I Akt ===
The first act starts the day, beginning with calm waters and a graphic representation of a sunrise. Railroad crossing gates are lowered, and a train travels down the tracks and proceeds into the city, ending at the Anhalter Bahnhof with a graphic of the "Berlin" sign approaching. The film then transitions through calm and empty streets, to the gradual process of the city waking up. At first, only objects are seen, such as a bit of paper blowing through an empty street, but soon a few people arise, then more are about, and the activity builds to crowds of workers going to work, pedestrians, busy streetcars, trains etc. A hand manipulates a lever, effectively turning on the city, and factory machinery springs to life. Glass bulbs are produced, sheets of metal are cut, molten steel is poured, smokestacks are seen against the sky, and the first act ends.

=== II Akt ===
The second act shows more of the general life of the city, beginning with the opening of gates, shutters, windows, doors, people busy cleaning, fruit carts, children going to school. Mailmen start their day, shops open. Different classes of people are seen, some mounting buses and streetcars, while wealthy men enter chauffeured private cars. The city is bustling with activity. Office workers prepare to start their day, as roll top desks open, people set out their pens, paper, open books, remove the cases from typewriters, and a bank of typists quickly erupt into activity. Keys on keyboards spiral around one another, and a montage of a spinning hypnotist's wheel, monkeys biting one another, telephone operators, machinery, and dogs fighting is mixed into the general busy work of the office, building quickly to a crescendo... phone receivers hang up.

=== III Akt ===
The third act shows more busy street life, and a variety of people of different classes going about their business. There are industrial workers, construction workers, salespeople, shoppers, etc. A fight between two men breaks out briefly, but is stopped by bystanders and a policeman. There are many crowds, a father and bride arriving at a wedding, some flirtation between people on the street, a coffin on a hearse seen through the windows of a streetcar, a diplomat arrives at a ministry, the Reich President is saluted by police, a conservative students' organization is marching with banners, an angry protester lectures a crowd, there are a few glimpses of racial minorities, many workers, and much chaotic activity. Trains and several newspapers are held up for display, dissolving over one another, bringing us to the end of the third act.

=== IV Akt ===
The fourth act starts with a lunch break. 12:00 is shown on a clock, and the spinning wheels of a factory slow to a stop. A variety of workers leave their workplaces. People start to eat and drink, and animals feed. Some poignant transitions intercut a wealthy diner with a lion feeding on meat from a bone, and hungry street kids embracing their mother clothed in rags sitting out on the steps. Many types of people eat, and some rest. Some poor folk sleep on benches or wall ledges, while activity goes on around them. Animals are seen resting, as an elephant lies down, a work dog tethered to a cart lies on the pavement, various zoo animals loll about. Idle kids play. Finally, a demanding diner in a café taps his spoon on a sugar bowl, and it awakens the city again, as the animals rise, then factory machinery starts up, and workers return to work. A paper press churns out newspapers, and a man reads a paper which is held up for our view... words leap up prominently from the page, first "Krise" (crisis), then "Mord" (murder), Börse (markets), "Heirat" (marriage), and then six times "Geld... Geld...Geld" (money, money, money). A storm of sorts arises, with the montage of revolving doors, wind, roller coasters and trains, rain, cyclones of leaves, a woman peering frantically over a rail into water, cut against points of views of roller coasters, churning water, a crowd looking down, a splash, eyes, fighting dogs, etc. The chaos eventually subsides, and the day winds down, as workers finish their day, and recreation begins. Children play in a lake, boats come out to race, and many kinds of races and games are displayed, finally concluding with a few romantic couples on park benches and the fall of night.

=== V Akt ===
The final act is devoted to the people's entertainment at night. House lights come on, then many advertising signs are lit, and people go out to the theater. Curtains open on a variety of performances, including showgirl burlesques, trapeze artists, jugglers, singers and dancers. Audiences gather in a movie theater, and a brief glimpse is seen of Chaplin's distinctive feet and cane at the bottom of a movie screen. As people leave a theater show, some sexuality is implied by a man's hand caressing a woman's bare arm as they enter a taxi, and her bare calf and frilly skirt are displayed. They pull away, ignoring a child beggar, and a lit up hotel sign is next displayed. Another montage of entertainments includes ice shows and hockey, skiers, sledders, indoor races, boxing and dance contests. The leitmotiv of streetcars continues, and rail workers continue to work through the night. People drink, flirt, and dance in beer halls and cocktail lounges, while card games and roulette are played. The city starts to spin wildly, transitions into a firework display, and thus ends the final act and the film.

== Reception ==
As of August 2025, the film holds a Rotten Tomatoes score of 86% based on seven reviews. Film critic Dennis Schwartz summarised the movie as "Outdated but still fine as an historical curio." In a list of the 100 most important German films, compiled in 1994 by the Association of German Cinémathèques, Berlin was placed at #3, behind only The Cabinet of Dr. Caligari and M.

=== Contemporary relevance ===
In 2007, a restored version of the film was shown with live orchestral accompaniment by the Rundfunk-Sinfonieorchester Berlin.

The Berlin-based electronic duo Tronthaim have performed their new audio dubbing to the film at numerous European cultural festivals, including "Notti d’Estate" in Florence and at the "Salon du livre" in Paris.

The film was re-scored by DJ Spooky at The Tate Modern in 2006 as one of the first performances of the museum to focus on live, large scale experimental cinema using the Turbine Hall.
