= Ghosts Before Breakfast =

1928 film

- Directed by: Hans Richter
- Written by: Werner Graeff; Hans Richter
- Produced by: Hans Richter
- Starring: Werner Graeff
- Cinematography: Reimar Kuntze
- Release date: 14 July 1928
- Running time: 6 minutes
- Country: Weimar Republic
- Language: Silent

Ghosts Before Breakfast (1928)

Ghosts Before Breakfast (German: Vormittagsspuk) is a 1928 German dadaist animated short film directed by Hans Richter. It utilizes stop motion for some of its effects and live action for others. The film does not present a coherent narrative, and includes a number of seemingly arbitrary images.

The original accompanying score composed by Paul Hindemith for a player piano is regarded as lost. New audio tracks have been created by artists such as The Real Tuesday Weld. British composer Ian Gardiner, who has written many scores for cinema and television, created a score for the film in 2006 (premiered by the Liverpool group Ensemble 10/10, directed by Clark Rundell). The UK ensemble Counterpoise (violin, trumpet, saxophone, piano) premiered American composer Jean Hasse's score in 2008, touring the UK - it can be seen on YouTube.

== Cast ==
In alphabetical order

- Werner Graeff
- Walter Gronostay
- Paul Hindemith
- Darius Milhaud
- Madeleine Milhaud
- Jean Oser
- Willi Pferdekamp
- Hans Richter
