= Werner Graeff =

German sculptor and artist

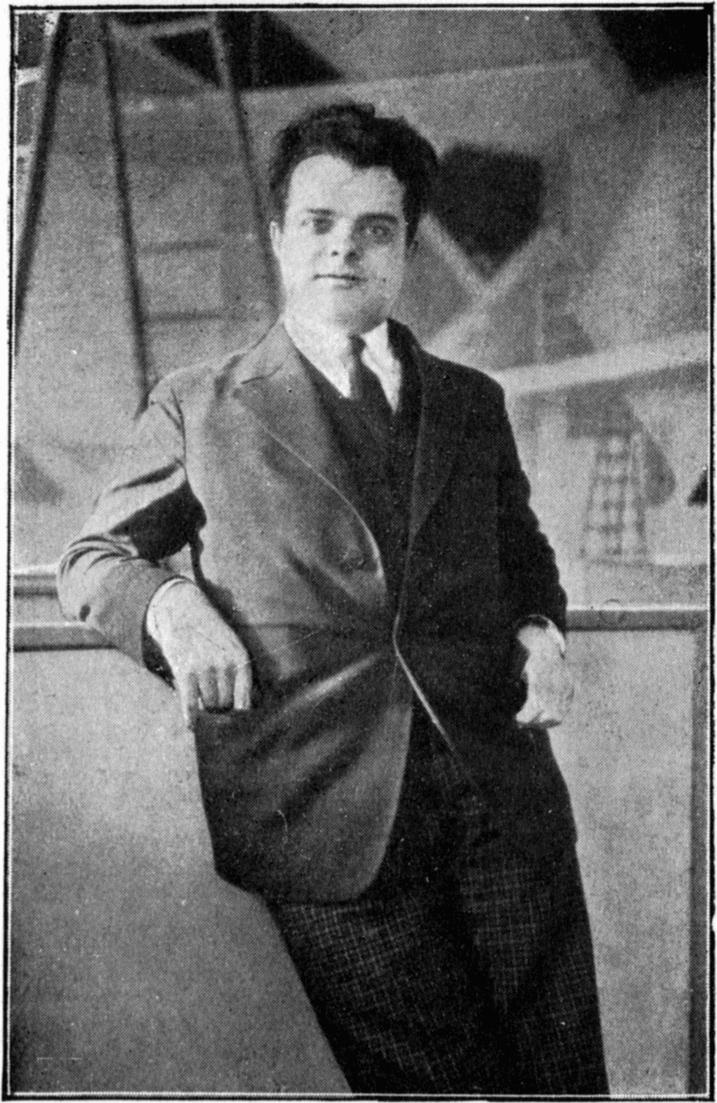
Werner Graeff in the Aubette, 1927

Werner Graeff (also Gräff; 24 August 24, 1901, Wuppertal – 29 August 29, 1978, Blacksburg, Virginia) was a German sculptor, painter, graphic artist, photographer, film maker and inventor.

== Career ==
In 1921 he started studying at the Bauhaus in Weimar. Here he soon came under the influence of Theo van Doesburg, and participated in a meeting in Weimar in May 1922 where van Doesberg, El Lissitzky and Hans Richter planned the intervention of the International Constructivist Faction at the International Congress of Progressive Artists held in Düsseldorf, 29–31 May 1922.

=== G: Material zur elementaren Gestaltung ===
In 1923 he worked with Richter and Lissitzky on the production of G: Material zur elementaren Gestaltung (G: Journal for Elementary Construction).

=== Film work ===
In 1928 he co-wrote the film Ghosts Before Breakfast with Hans Richter.

=== Sculpture ===
Two of Graeff's sculptures are on display at the Skulpturenmuseum Marl (formerly the Skulpturenmuseum Glaskasten) in Marl, North Rhine-Westphalia.

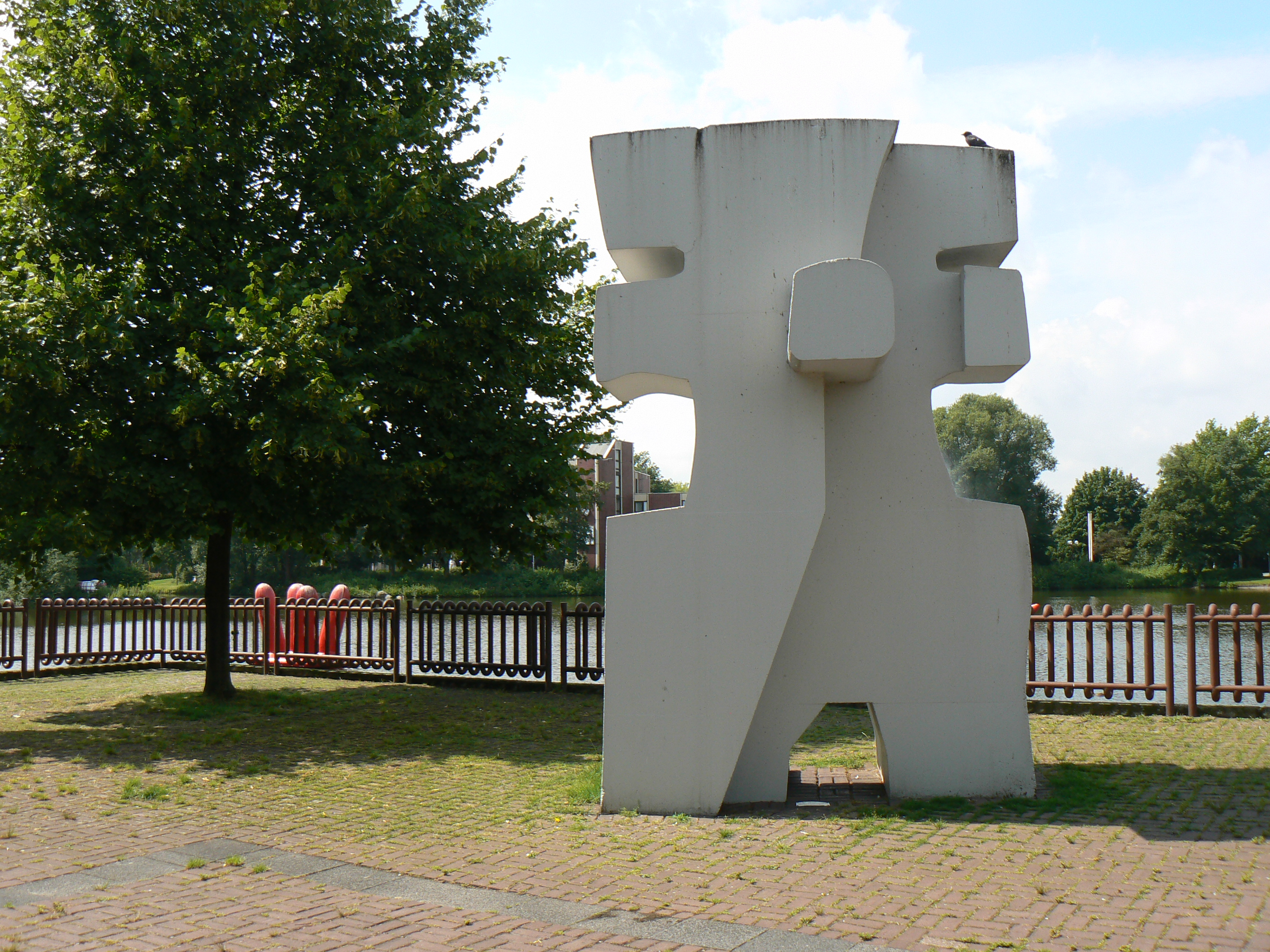
Marlsku (1970-2)

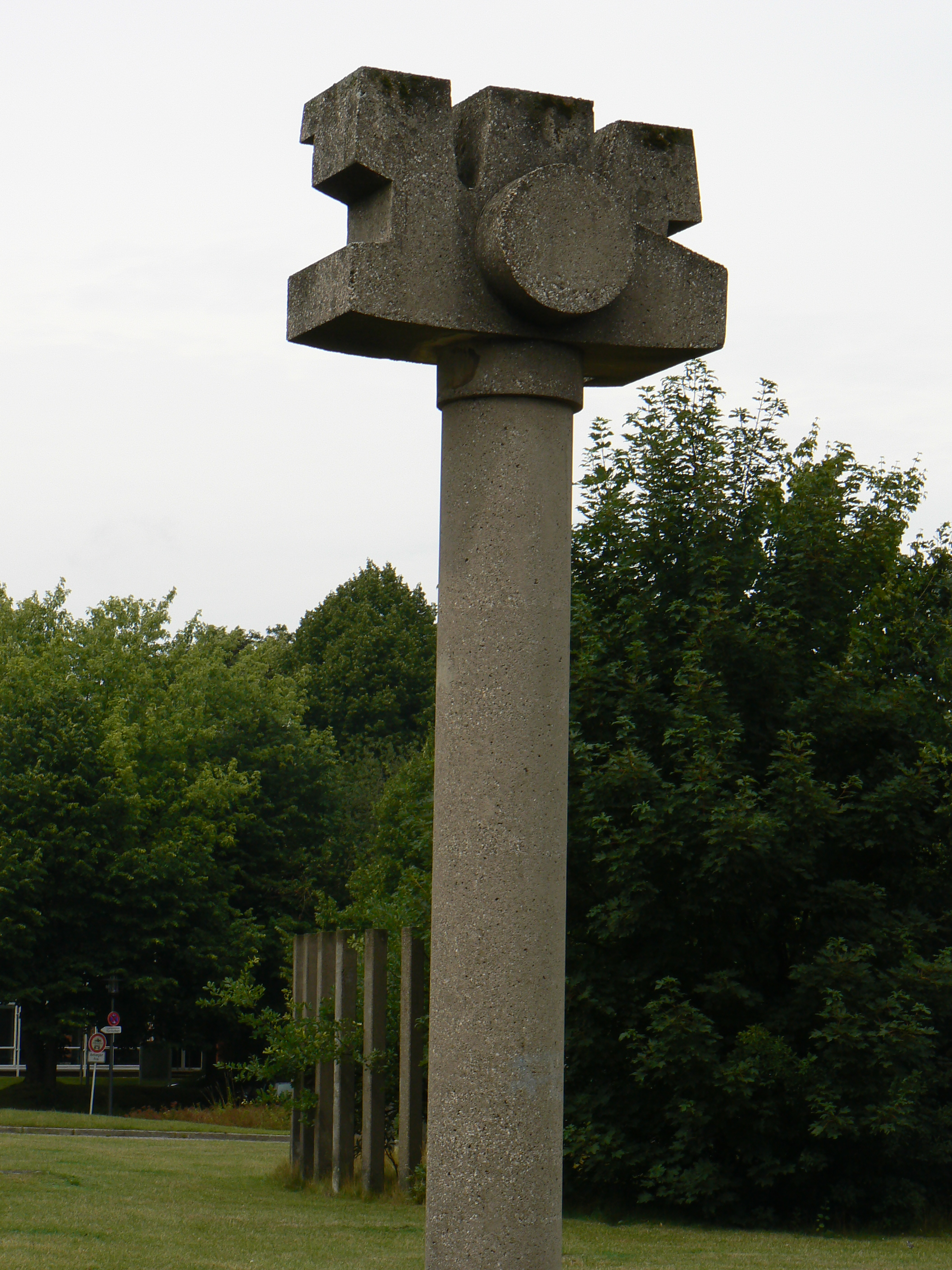
Polsku (1972)

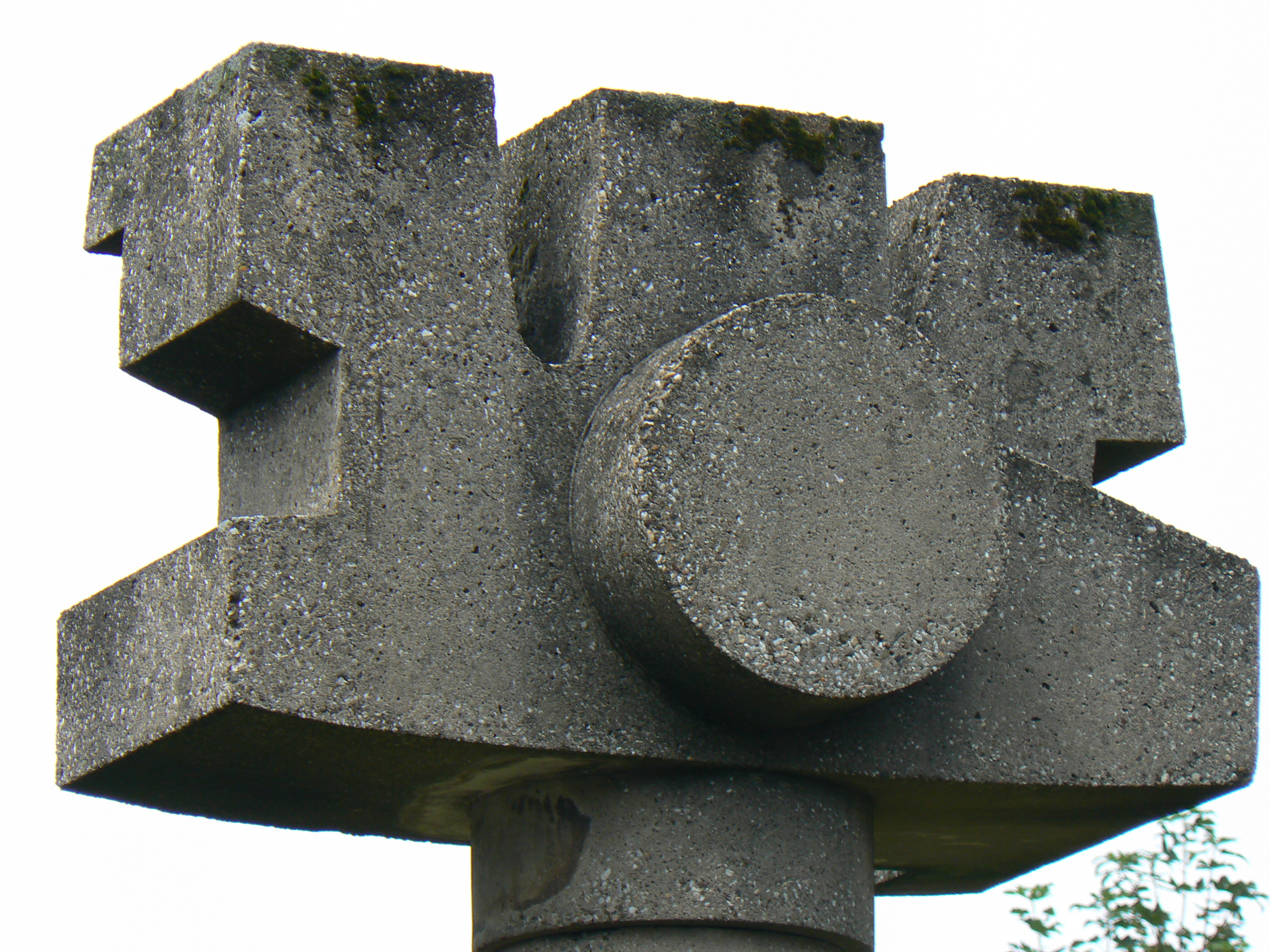
Polsku (detail)
