= Rhythmus 21 =

1921 film

- Directed by: Hans Richter
- Release date: 1921
- Running time: 3 minutes
- Country: Germany
- Language: Silent

Rhythmus 21 is a 1921 German absolute film directed by Hans Richter. Rhythmus 21 was made in black and white, and runs approximately 3 minutes. The film is the first installment of Richter's Film Ist Rhythm series and is considered, by experts, an early and influential film to the abstract film movement. Many absolute films were described as a mixture of art, film, and music because they present on the screen many musical elements such as dynamics, rhythm, and motion. The films in this series get their name from their visual rhythmic element that closely resembles music.

== Production ==
Rhythmus 21

Hans Richter finished his first film, Rhythmus 21 (a.k.a. Film ist Rhythmus), in 1921, but kept changing elements until he first presented the work on 7 July 1923 in Paris at the dadaist Soirée du coeur à barbe program in Théâtre Michel. It was an abstract animation of rectangular shapes, partly inspired by his connections with De Stijl. Founder Theo van Doesburg had visited Richter and Eggeling in December 1920 and reported on their film works in his magazine De Stijl in May and July 1921.
