= Hans Richter (artist) =

German artist (1888–1976)

- Richter c. 1928
- Born: Hans Johannes Siegfried Richter; 6 April 1888; Berlin, Germany
- Died: 1 February 1976 (aged 87); Minusio, Switzerland
- Occupations: Painter, graphic artist, avant-gardist, film maker, animation producer
- Years active: 1914–1961
- Spouse: Meta Erna Niemeyer (aka Ré Soupault)

Hans Johannes Siegfried Richter (/ˈrɪktər/; German: [ˈʁɪçtɐ]; 6 April 1888 – 1 February 1976) was a German Dada painter, graphic artist, avant-garde film producer, and art historian. In 1965 he authored the book Dadaism about the history of the Dada movement. He was born in Berlin into a well-to-do family and died in Minusio, near Locarno, Switzerland.

From Expressionism through Dadaism, Constructivism and Neoplasticism, he was one of the major figures of avant-garde art in the 1910s and 1920s and a catalyst for intellectuals and artists in many disciplines. Richter helped organise exhibitions which revived interest in Dada, both in the United States and Europe. In 1956 he made Dadascope, a film dedicated to Dada poetry.

== Youth ==
Hans Richter was born in 1888 to a Jewish family, the son of legation counselor Moritz Richter and his wife Ida Gabriela Rothschild. Even as a child, he wanted to be a painter. He began his first graphic works at the age of 14. His father initially forbade him from studying painting and persuaded him to study architecture instead. As a prerequisite, he completed a two-year apprenticeship as a carpenter and joiner in his father's business in Berlin. After completing his apprenticeship in 1908, his father enabled him to attend the Berlin Academy of Art.

== Germany ==
In 1908 Richter entered the Academy of Fine Art in Berlin, and the following year the Academy of Fine Art in Weimar. Richter's first contacts with Modern Art were in 1912 through the Blaue Reiter and in 1913 through the Erster Deutscher Herbstsalon gallery Der Sturm, in Berlin. In 1914 he was influenced by Cubism.

At that time he also befriended Franz Pfemfert, who was the editor of Die Aktion. Richter contributed to the periodical Die Aktion in Berlin. His first exhibition was in Munich in 1916, and Die Aktion published a special edition about him. In the same year he was wounded and discharged from the army and went to Zürich and met Tristan Tzara, Marcel Janco, Jean Arp, and Hugo Ball, who together were forming the Dada movement, which he joined.

Richter believed that the artist's duty was to be politically active by opposing war and supporting revolution. His first abstract art works were made in 1917. In 1918, Tristan Tzara introduced Richter to Viking Eggeling and the two experimented together with film. Richter was co-founder, in 1919, of the Association of Revolutionary Artists (Artistes Radicaux) at Zürich. In the same year he created his first Prélude: an orchestration of a theme developed in eleven drawings. In 1920, he became a member of the November Group in Berlin and contributed to the Dutch periodical De Stijl.

Rhythmus 21 (1921)

Throughout his career, Richter claimed that his 1921 film, Rhythmus 21, was the first abstract film ever created, but in fact it was preceded by the Italian Futurist films by Bruno Corra and Arnaldo Ginna (as they report in the Futurist Manifesto of Cinema), as well as by fellow German artist Walter Ruttmann, who produced Lichtspiel Opus 1 in 1920. Nevertheless, Richter's film Rhythmus 21 is considered an important early abstract film.

In 1933, The Nazis ransacked Richter's studio in Berlin, confiscating or destroying his work. He was stripped of his German citizenship and labelled a degenerate artist and "cultural Bolshevik". After attempting, in vain, to make an anti-Nazi film in the Soviet Union in 1931–1932, Richter travelled around Europe. He worked for Philips in Holland and made commissioned films in Switzerland. He also gave numerous lectures about film.

About Richter's woodcuts and drawings Michel Seuphor wrote that Richter's black-and-whites graphic work, together with that of Hans Arp and Marcel Janco, are the most typical works of the Zürich period of Dada. From 1923 to 1926, Richter edited, together with Werner Gräff and Mies van der Rohe, the periodical G. Material zur elementaren Gestaltung. Richter wrote of his own attitude toward film:

I conceive of the film as a modern art form particularly interesting to the sense of sight. Painting has its own peculiar problems and specific sensations, and so has the film. But there are also problems in which the dividing line is obliterated, or where the two infringe upon each other. More especially, the cinema can fulfill certain promises made by the ancient arts, in the realization of which painting and film become close neighbors and work together.

== United States ==
Richter moved from Switzerland to the United States in 1940 and became an American citizen. Beginning in 1941 he taught at the Institute of Film Techniques at the City College of New York before taking over as director. While living in New York City, Richter directed two feature films, Dreams That Money Can Buy (1947) and 8×8: A Chess Sonata in 8 Movements (1957) in collaboration with Max Ernst, Jean Cocteau, Paul Bowles, Fernand Léger, Alexander Calder, Marcel Duchamp, and others, which was partially filmed on the lawn of his summer house in Southbury, Connecticut. In 1957, he finished a film entitled Dadascope with original poems and prose spoken by their creators: Hans Arp, Marcel Duchamp, Raoul Hausmann, Richard Huelsenbeck, and Kurt Schwitters. After 1958, Richter spent parts of the year in Ascona and Connecticut and returned to painting. Peggy Guggenheim organized his first solo show in the United States in which his large painted scrolls, inspired by the Second World War, featured prominently. In 1963, he directed the short film From the Circus to the Moon about the American artist Alexander Calder. In 1965, Richter was also the author of a first-hand account of the Dada movement titled Dada: Art and Anti-Art which also included his reflections on the emerging Neo-Dada artworks.

== Personal life ==
Hans Richter was married four times: in 1916 to Elisabeth (Lisa, Lies, Lieska) Steinert († 1923), in 1921 to Maria von Vanselow (divorced 1922), in 1927 to Erna Niemeyer (pseudonyms: Renate Green, Ré Soupault, René Mensch), in 1951 to Frida Ruppel (1910–78), whose two children Hans Ruppel and Ursula Lawder administered the estate.

== Filmography ==
- Rhythmus 21 (1921)
- Rhythmus 23 (1923)
- Rhythmus 25 (1925)
- Filmstudie (1926) with music by Hans Heinz Stuckenschmidt
- Inflation (1928)
- Vormittagsspuk ("Ghosts Before Breakfast", with music by Hindemith) (1928)
- Zweigroschenzauber (1929)
- The Storming of La Sarraz (written only, directed by Sergei Eisenstein, lost) (1929)
- Rennsymphonie (1929)
- Alles dreht sich, alles bewegt sich (1929)
- Everyday (1929)
- Neues Leben (1930)
- Europa Radio (1931)
- Hallo Everybody (1933)
- Keine Zeit für Tränen (1934)
- Vom Blitz zum Fernsenhbild (1936)
- Dreams That Money Can Buy (1947)
- 8×8: A Chess Sonata in 8 Movements (1957)
- Dadascope (1961)
- From the Circus to the Moon (1963)

== See also ==
- Anti-art
- Experimental film
- Animation
- Dada
- Art intervention
- List of Dadaists
- Épater la bourgeoisie
