= Viking Eggeling =

Swedish artist (1880–1925)

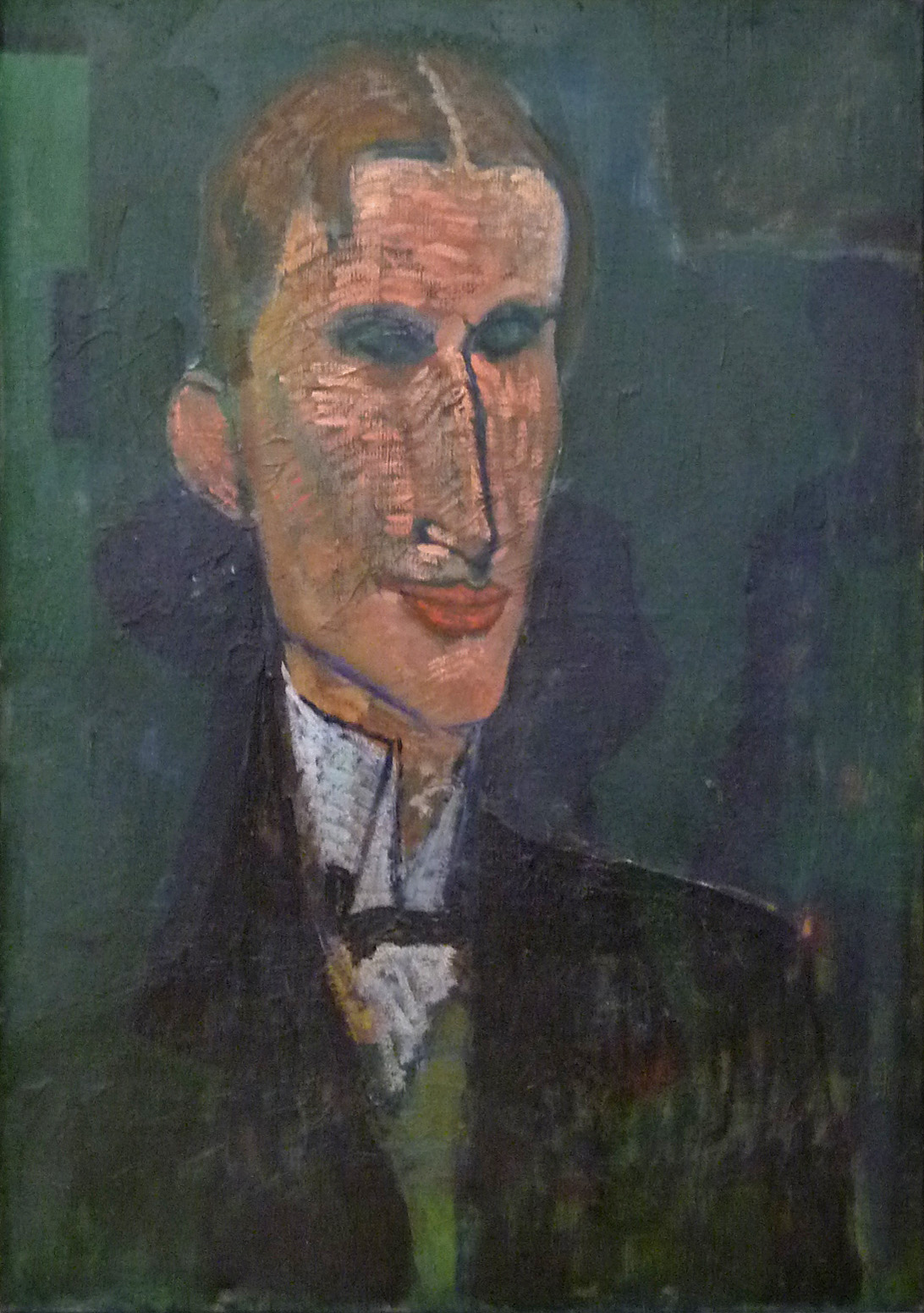
- Viking Eggeling by Amedeo Modigliani, 1918
- Born: 21 October 1880; Lund, Sweden
- Died: 19 May 1925 (aged 44); Berlin, Germany
- Occupations: Artist, filmmaker
- Notable work: Diagonal-Symphonie

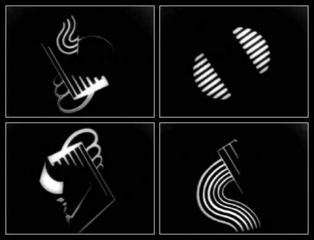
Four frames from "Diagonal-Symphonie"

Viking Eggeling (21 October 1880 – 19 May 1925) was a Swedish avant-garde artist and filmmaker connected to dadaism, Constructivism, and abstract art and was one of the pioneers in absolute film and visual music. His 1924 film Diagonal-Symphonie is one of the seminal abstract films in the history of experimental cinema.

== Biography ==
Eggeling was born on 21 October 1880 in Lund.

=== Early career ===
At the age of sixteen, the orphaned Eggeling moved to Germany to pursue an artistic career. He studied art history in Milan from 1901 to 1907, supporting himself with work as a bookkeeper. From 1907 to 1911, he taught Art at the Hochalpines Lyceum in Zuoz/Institut Engiadina (today Lyceum Alpinum Zuoz) in Switzerland. He lived in Paris from 1911 to 1915, where he was acquainted with Amedeo Modigliani, Hans Arp, Léopold Survage and other artists of the time. At this point his art was influenced by Cubism, but soon grew more abstract, and in the years 1915–1917, influenced more specifically by the Rythmes colorés of Survage, he started making sketches on scrolls, or "picture rolls" as he would call them, that he later made into his abstract films Horizontal-Vertikal Messe (now lost) and Diagonal-Symphonie.

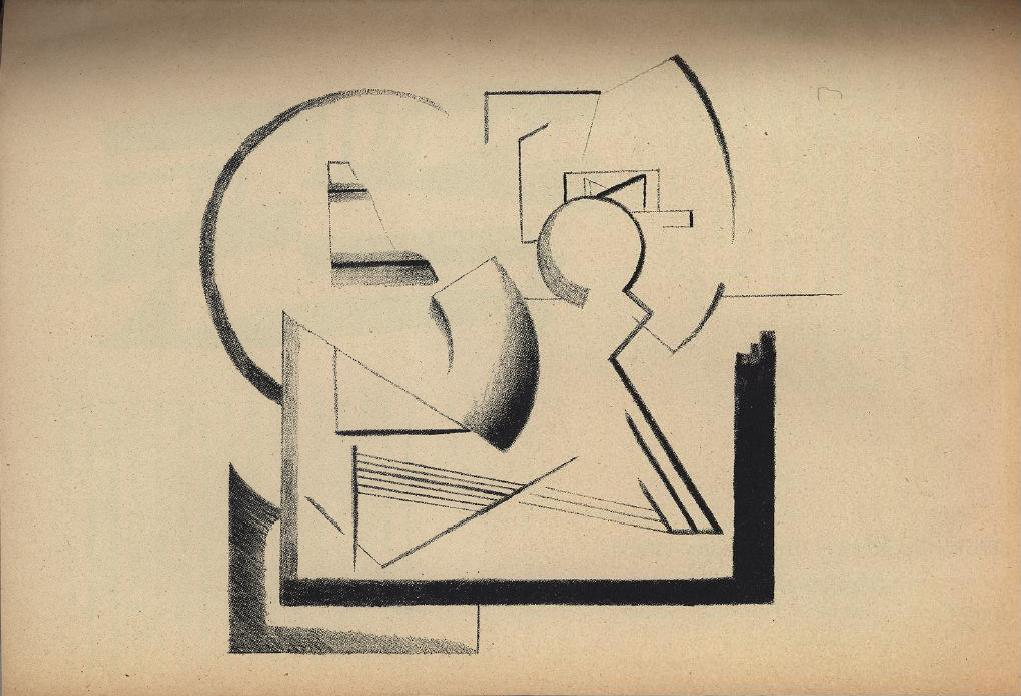
"Basse générale de la peinture. Extension" Lithography (1919)

=== Zürich and Dada ===
In Zürich in 1918, he re-connected with Hans Arp and took part in several Dada activities, befriending Marcel Janco, Richard Huelsenbeck, Sophie Taeuber, and the other dadaists connected to the Cabaret Voltaire. In 1919 he also joined the group Das Neue Leben ("New Life"), that was based in Basel and featured Marcel Janco, Hans Arp, Sophie Taeuber, Augusto Giacometti, and others. The group supported an educational approach to modern art, coupled with socialist ideals and Constructivist aesthetics. In its art manifesto, the group declared its ideal of "rebuild[ing] the human community" in preparation for the end of capitalism. In the same year Eggeling was co-founder of the similar group Artistes Radicaux ("Radical Artists"), a more political section of the Neue Leben group. During this time, in 1918, Tristan Tzara introduced him to Hans Richter, with whom he would work intimately for a couple of years, and in 1919 the two of them left Switzerland for Germany. Richter later wrote that "The contrast between us, which was that between method and spontaneity, only served to strengthen our mutual attraction...for three years we marched side by side, although we fought on separate fronts."

=== Berlin ===
In Germany his first stop was Berlin, where he met with Raoul Hausmann, Hannah Höch and other radical artists. He here also joined the Novembergruppe ("November Group"), a radical political group that featured many artists connected to Dada, Bauhaus and Constructivism. After moving to Klein-Kölzig with Richter, he continued his experiments with "picture rolls". These scrolls were sequences of painted images on long rolls of paper that investigate the transformation of geometrical forms and could be up to 15 meters in length. As they were to be "read" from left to right, this soon evolved into cinematographic experimentation on film stock. In 1920, Eggeling began producing his first film, Horizontal-Vertikal-Messe, based on a "picture roll" containing approximately 5000 images. In 1921, he ends his collaboration with Richter and postpones his work on Horizontal-Vertikal-Messe. In 1923 he instead collaborates with Erna Niemeyer and works on Diagonal-Symphonie, a synthesis of image, rhythm, movement and music, created from series of black sheets of paper with cut-out geometrical shapes. This film was completed in 1924 and shown for the first time in November the same year. Its first public screening was in Berlin in May 1925, at the film program "Der absolute Film", arranged by the Novembergruppe. 16 days later, Eggeling died of blood poisoning.

== Gallery ==
Diagonal-Symphonie (1924)

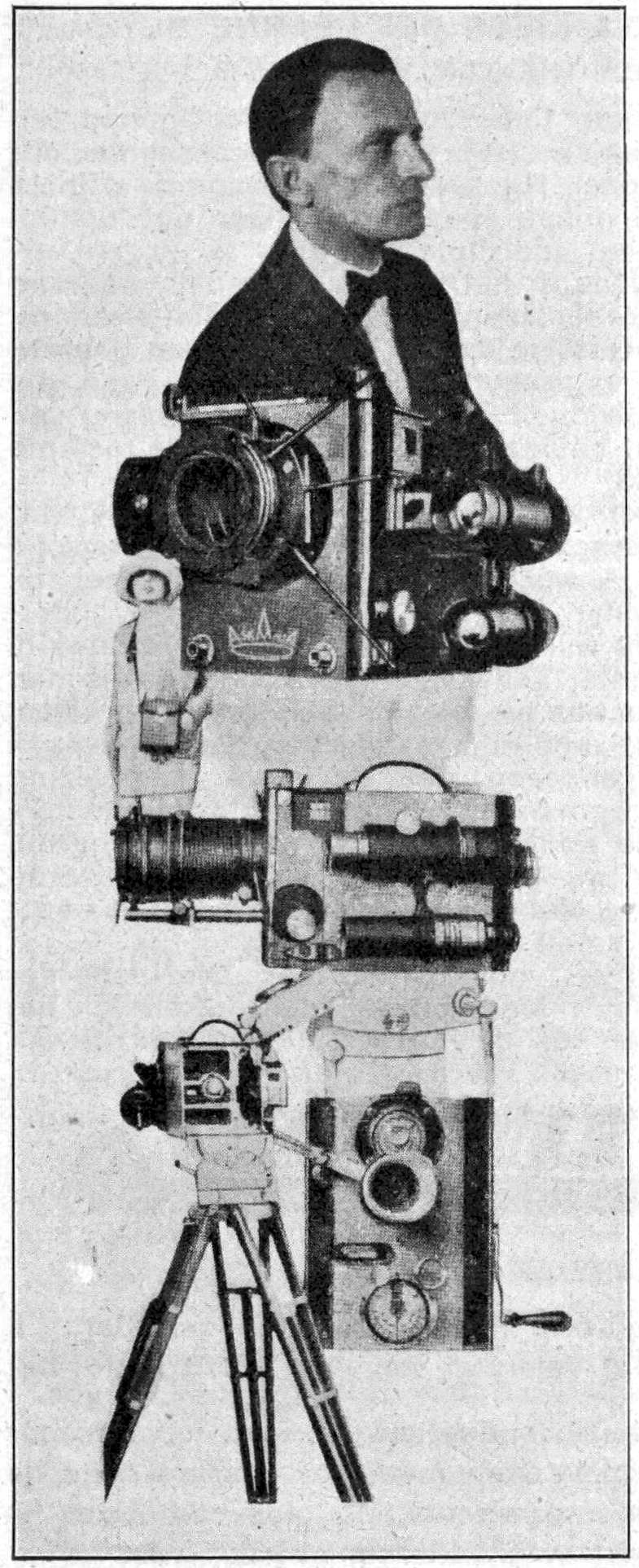
Viking Eggeling, 1924.

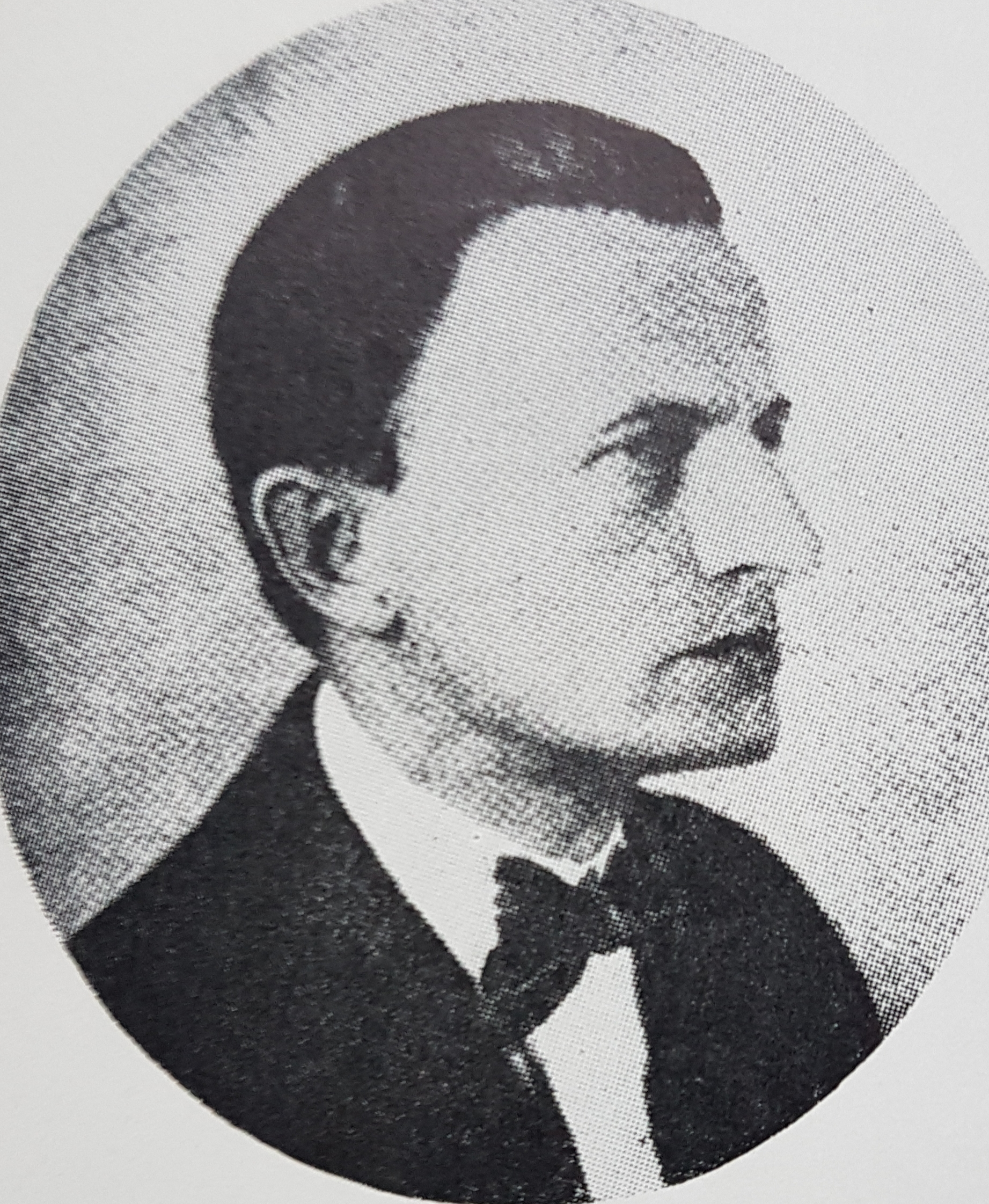
Viking Eggeling ca 1925.

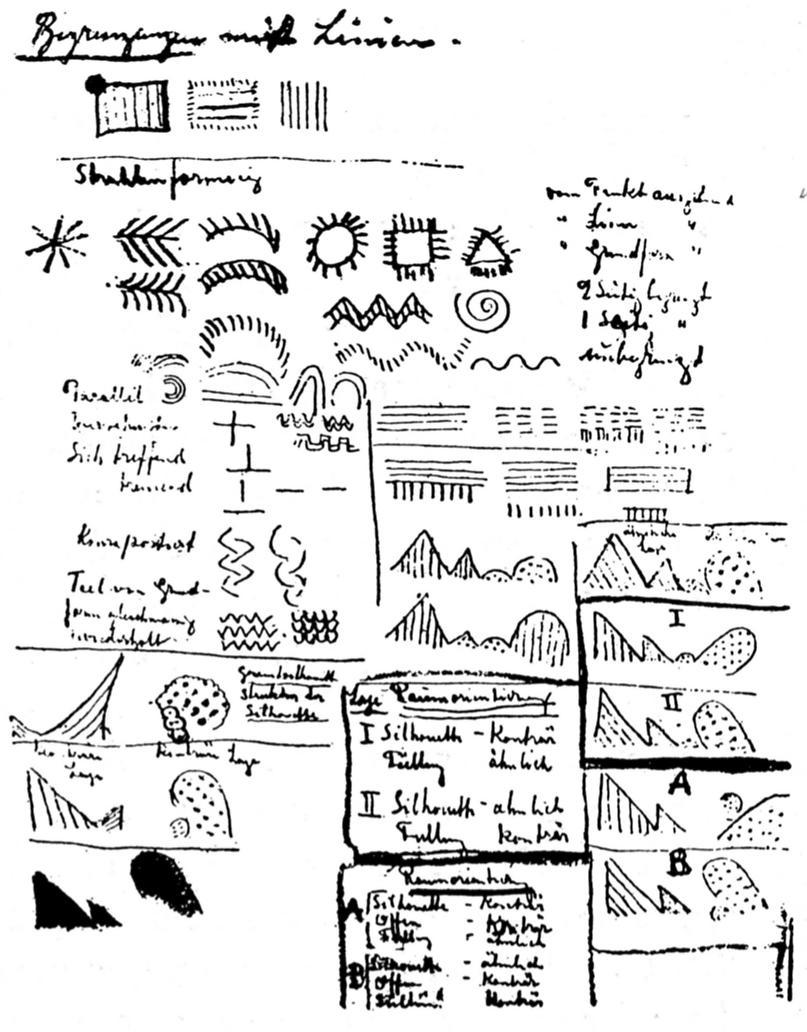
1918.

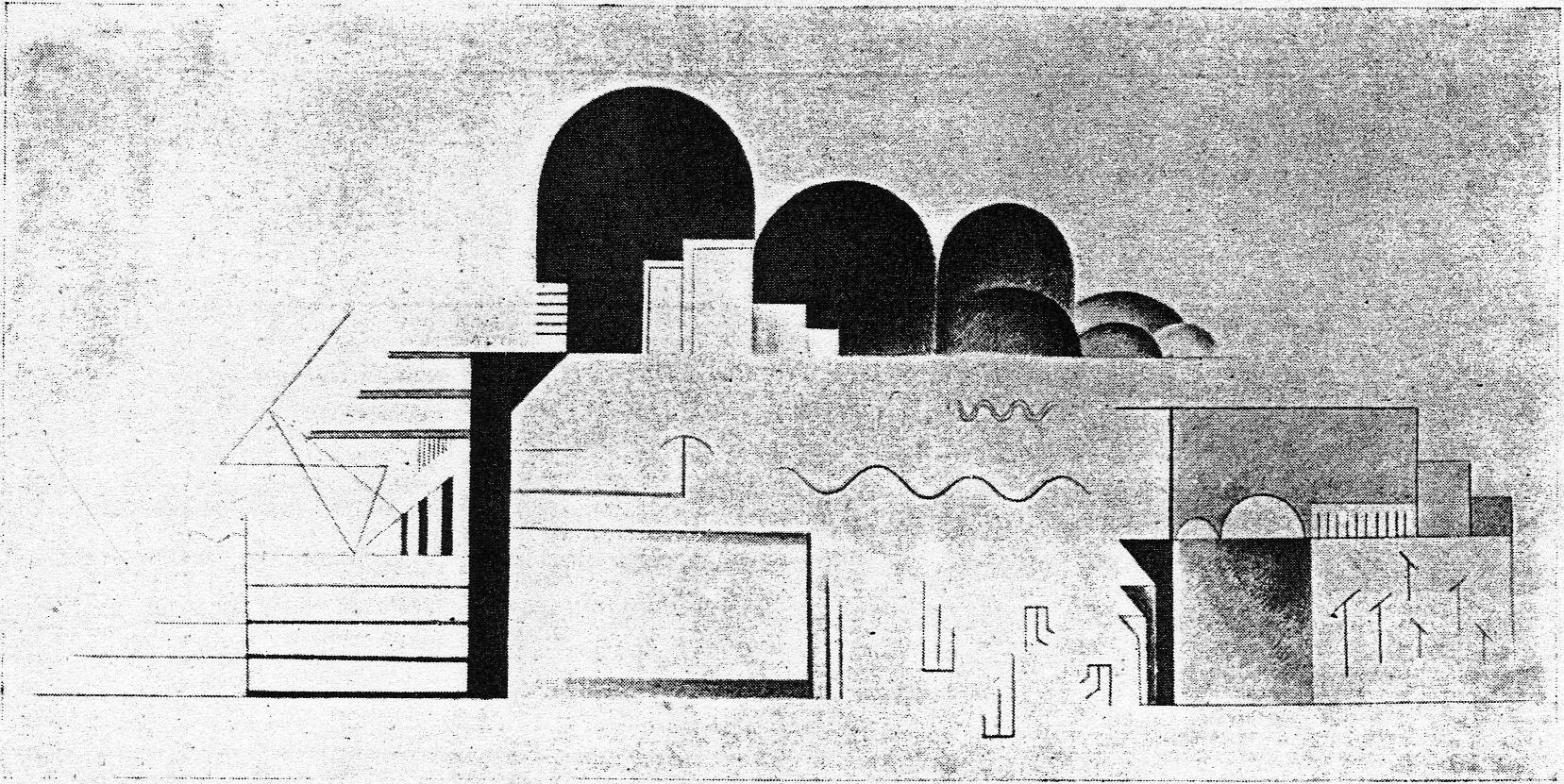
1921.

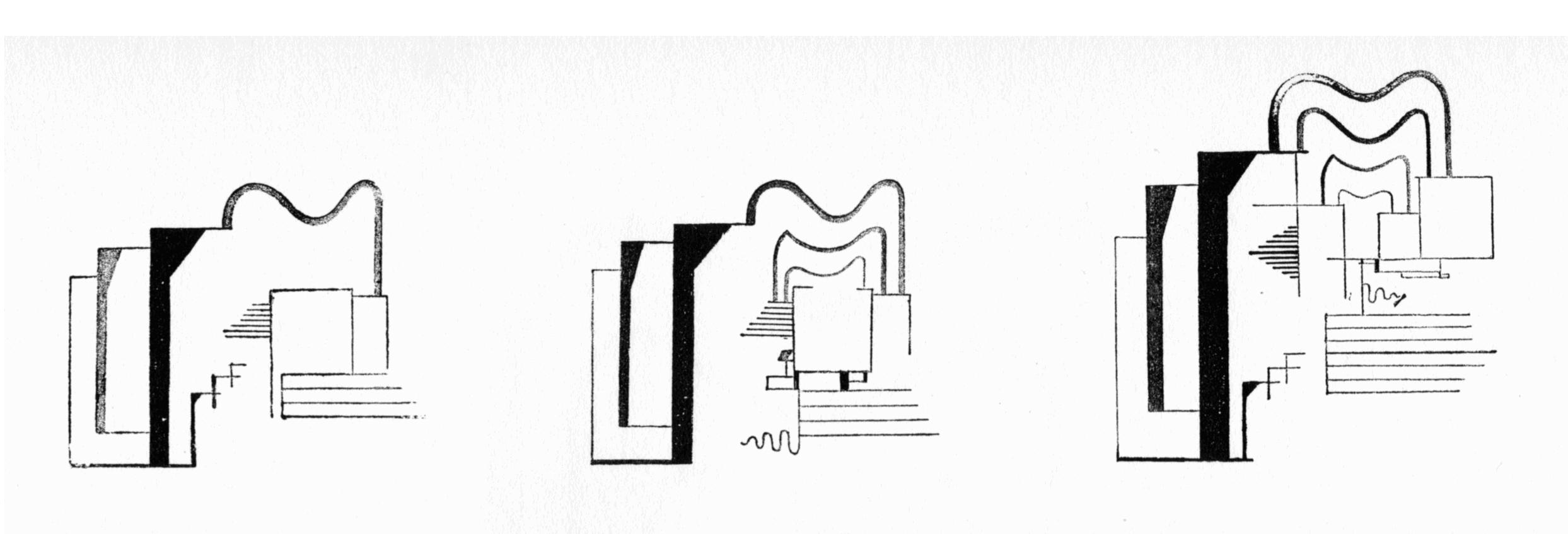
1921.

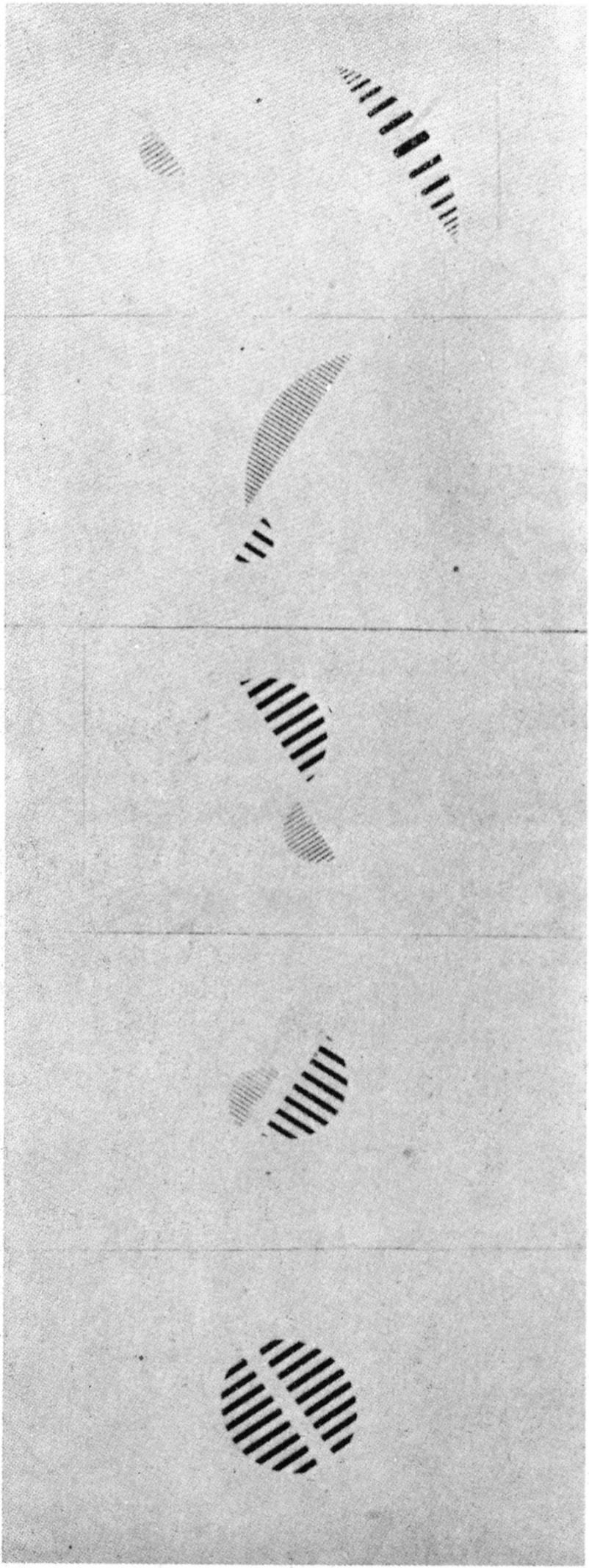
1923.

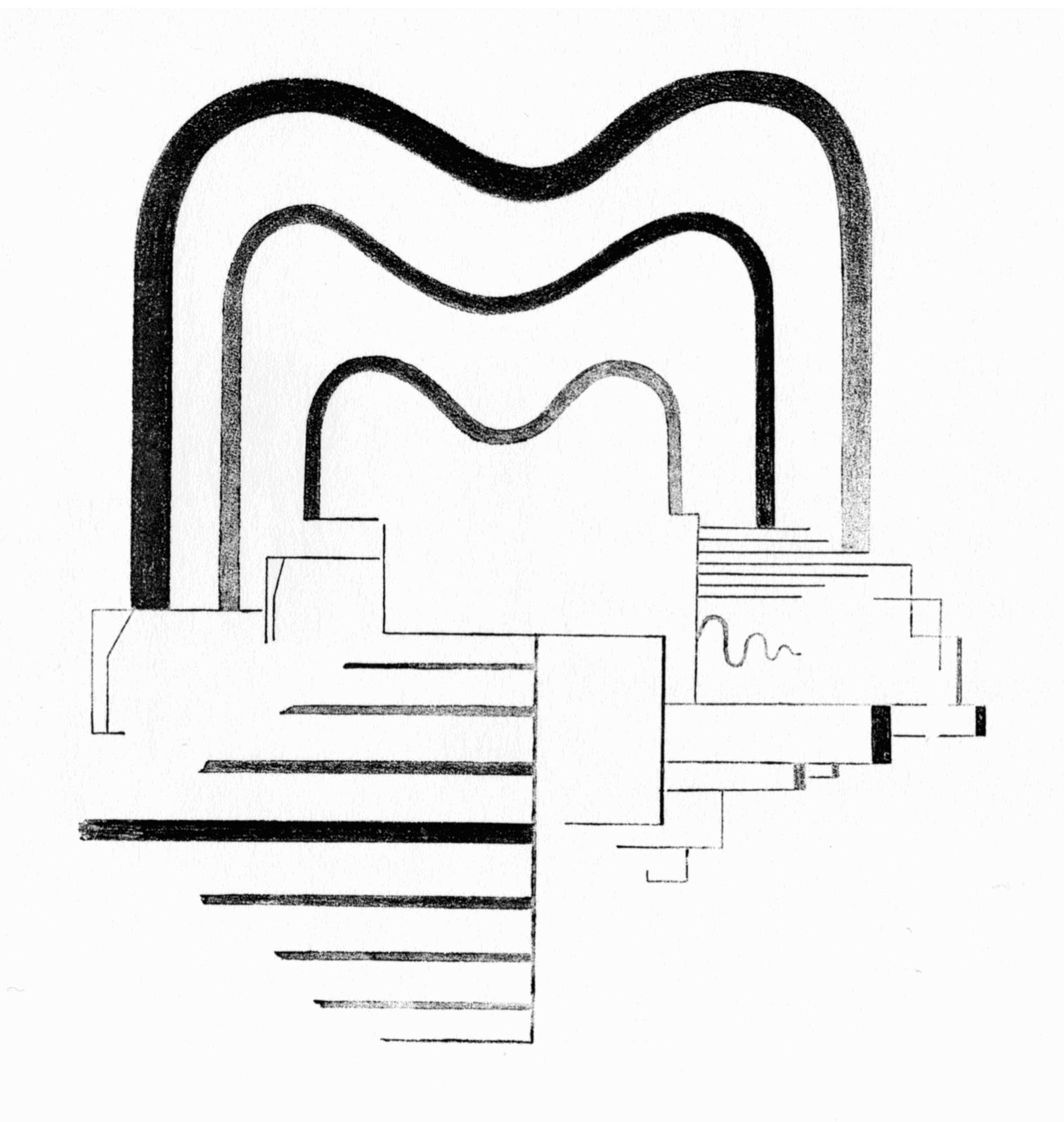
"Basse générale de la peinture. Extension" Lithography (1919)
