= List of French films of 1933 =

French films released in 1933

A list of films produced in France in 1933:

== A-L ==
Title	Director	Cast	Genre	Notes
600,000 Francs a Month	Léo Joannon	Georges Biscot, Germaine Michel, Jean Aymé	Comedy	
The Abbot Constantine	Jean-Paul Paulin	Françoise Rosay, Claude Dauphin, Betty Stockfeld	Comedy	
The Agony of the Eagles	Roger Richebé	Annie Ducaux, Pierre Renoir, Constant Rémy	Historical	
Bach the Millionaire	Henry Wulschleger	Bach, Georges Tréville, Germaine Charley	Comedy	
The Barber of Seville	Jean Kemm	André Baugé, Fernand Charpin, Hélène Robert	Musical	
Bastille Day	René Clair	Annabella, George Rigaud, Raymond Cordy	Comedy	
The Battle	Nicolas Farkas, Victor Tourjansky	Charles Boyer, Annabella, Betty Stockfeld	War drama	Co-production with the United Kingdom
Broken Wings	André Berthomieu	Victor Francen, Alice Field, Abel Tarride	Drama	
The Case of Doctor Brenner	Jean Daumery	Jean Marchat, Simone Genevois, Maurice Rémy	Drama	
Charlemagne	Pierre Colombier	Raimu, Marie Glory, Jean Dax	Comedy	
Chotard and Company	Jean Renoir	Jeanne Boitel, Fernand Charpin, Jeanne Loury	Comedy	
Ciboulette	Claude Autant-Lara	Simone Berriau, Robert Burnier, Armand Dranem	Musical	
Colomba	Jacques Séverac	Genica Athanasiou, Jean Angelo, Josette Day	Drama	
The Crime of Bouif	André Berthomieu	Félicien Tramel, Jeanne Helbling, Mady Berry	Comedy	
Criminal	Jack Forrester	Harry Baur, Pierre Alcover, Jean Servais	Drama	
Don Quixote	G. W. Pabst	Feodor Chaliapin, Oscar Asche, George Robey	Adventure	Co-production with the United Kingdom
L'Épervier	Marcel L'Herbier	Charles Boyer, Natalie Paley, Pierre Richard-Willm	Drama	
Étienne	Jean Tarride	Junie Astor, Jacques Baumer	Comedy drama	
Goodbye, Beautiful Days	André Beucler, Johannes Meyer	Brigitte Helm, Jean Gabin, Ginette Leclerc	Comedy	Co-production with Germany
The Heir of the Bal Tabarin	Jean Kemm	Frédéric Duvallès, Charlotte Lysès, Germaine Michel	Comedy	
High and Low	Georg Wilhelm Pabst	Jean Gabin, Janine Crispin, Michel Simon	Comedy	
Honeymoon Trip	Germain Fried	Brigitte Helm, Albert Préjean, Pierre Brasseur	Comedy	Co-production with Austria
The House of Mystery	Gaston Roudès	Jacques Varennes, Blanche Montel, Rolla Norman	Crime	
Idylle au Caire	Reinhold Schünzel, Claude Heymann	Renate Müller, George Rigaud, Henry Roussel	Comedy	Co-production with Germany
The Illustrious Maurin	André Hugon	Antonin Berval, Nicole Vattier, Jean Aquistapace	Drama	
In Old Alsace	Jacques de Baroncelli	Lucien Duboscq, Simone Bourday, Madeleine Guitty	Drama	
The Invisible Woman	Georges Lacombe	Jean Weber, Suzanne Christy, Mady Berry	Comedy	
The Ironmaster	Fernand Rivers	Gaby Morlay, Henri Rollan, Léon Belières	Drama	
Jocelyn	Pierre Guerlais	Samson Fainsilber, Marguerite Weintenberger	Drama	
Knock	Roger Goupillières	Louis Jouvet, Robert Le Vigan, Madeleine Ozeray	Comedy	
Let's Touch Wood	Maurice Champreux	Jeanne Cheirel, Armand Bernard	Comedy	
The Little King	Julien Duvivier	Robert Lynen, Arlette Marchal, Jean Toulout	Drama	
A Love Story	Max Ophüls	Abel Tarride, Magda Schneider, Simone Héliard	Drama	

== M-Z ==
Title	Director	Cast	Genre	Notes
The Man with the Hispano	Jean Epstein	Jean Murat, Marie Bell, Gaston Mauger	Drama	
A Man's Neck	Julien Duvivier	Harry Baur, Valéry Inkijinoff, Alexandre Rignault	Crime thriller	
Mannequins	René Hervil	Noël-Noël, Gaby Basset, Paul Amiot	Comedy	
La Maternelle	Jean Benoît-Lévy, Marie Epstein	Madeleine Renaud, Mady Berry, Alice Tissot	Drama	
Miss Helyett	Jean Kemm	Josette Day, Jim Gérald, Roger Bourdin	Musical	
My Hat	Lucien Jaquelux	Noël-Noël, Jackie Monnier, Marcel Dalio	Comedy	
Nothing But Lies	Karl Anton	Robert Burnier, Marguerite Moreno, Jackie Monnier	Comedy	
Number 33	Karl Anton	André Luguet, Edwige Feuillère, Abel Tarride	Spy drama	
The Old Devil	Anatole Litvak	Harry Baur, Pierre Blanchar, Alice Field	Drama	
On the Streets	Victor Trivas	Jean-Pierre Aumont, Madeleine Ozeray, Paulette Dubost	Crime	
One Night's Song	Pierre Colombier, Anatole Litvak	Jan Kiepura, Magda Schneider, Pierre Brasseur	Musical	Co-production with Germany
Once Upon a Time	Léonce Perret	Gaby Morlay, André Luguet, André Dubosc	Drama	
Paprika	Jean de Limur	Irène Zilahy, René Lefèvre, Christiane Delyne	Comedy	
Paris-Soleil	Jean Hémard	Alfred Pizella, Claude Dauphin, Janine Guise	Comedy	
Le Petit Roi	Julien Duvivier	Robert Lynen, Arlette Marchal	Comedy drama	
The Porter from Maxim's	Karl Anton	Tramel, Suzy Vernon, Mireille Perrey	Comedy	
Pour etre aime	Jacques Tourneur	Suzy Vernon, Pierre Richard-Willm		
The Premature Father	René Guissart	Fernand Gravey, Edith Méra, Saturnin Fabre	Comedy	
The Red Robe	Jean de Marguenat	Constant Rémy, Marcelle Praince	Drama	
Roger la Honte	Gaston Roudès	Constant Rémy, Germaine Rouer	Historical	
Simone Is Like That	Karl Anton	Meg Lemonnier, Henri Garat, Pierre Etchepare	Comedy	
The Star of Valencia	Serge de Poligny	Brigitte Helm, Jean Gabin, Simone Simon	Drama	Made in Germany by UFA
The Surprises of Divorce	Jean Kemm	Léon Belières, Nadine Picard, Charles Lamy	Comedy	
Theodore and Company	Pierre Colombier	Raimu, Albert Préjean, Alice Field	Comedy	
Three Lucky Fools	Mario Bonnard	Tito Schipa, Simone Vaudry	Comedy	Co-production with Italy
To Be Loved	Jacques Tourneur	Pierre Richard-Willm, Suzy Vernon, Colette Darfeuil	Comedy	
Topaze	Louis J. Gasnier	Louis Jouvet, Simone Héliard	Comedy	
Toto	Jacques Tourneur	Albert Préjean, Renée Saint-Cyr, Félix Oudart	Comedy	
The Tunnel	Curtis Bernhardt	Jean Gabin, Madeleine Renaud	Science fiction	Co-production with Germany
The Two Orphans	Maurice Tourneur	Rosine Deréan, Renée Saint-Cyr, Gabriel Gabrio	Historical	
A Weak Woman	Max de Vaucorbeil	Meg Lemonnier, André Luguet, Pierre de Guingand	Comedy	
The Weaker Sex	Robert Siodmak	Mireille Balin, Victor Boucher	Comedy	
Zéro de conduite	Jean Vigo	Jean Dasté, Delphin, Robert Le Flon	Drama	

== See also ==
- 1933 in France
