= Moses and Solomon, Perfumers =

1935 film

- Directed by: André Hugon
- Written by: Georges Fagot; Paul Fékété
- Produced by: André Hugon
- Starring: Léon Belières; Charles Lamy; Meg Lemonnier
- Cinematography: Marc Bujard; Georges Kostal
- Music by: Jacques Janin
- Production company: Productions André Hugon
- Release date: 13 December 1935
- Running time: 97 minutes
- Country: France
- Language: French

Moses and Solomon, Perfumers (French: Moïse et Salomon parfumeurs) is a 1935 French comedy film directed by André Hugon and starring Léon Belières, Charles Lamy and Meg Lemonnier. The film's sets were designed by the art director Robert-Jules Garnier. It is the third in a series of films begun by Levy and Company (1930) about two Jewish businessmen.

== Synopsis ==
Moses and Solomon run a small bazaar in Paris, where they are they are assisted by their attractive niece Lia who has a degree in chemistry. Lia has developed a new perfume and hopes it will be stocked at a fancy store run by a Catholic family. She finds herself becoming attracted by André, the son of the owners. Moses and Solomon themselves decide to become perfumers.

== Cast ==
- Léon Belières as Moïse
- Charles Lamy as Salomon
- Meg Lemonnier as Lia
- Albert Préjean as André
- Alexandre Mihalesco as Le rabbin
- Huguette Grégory as La marquise
- Yvonne Yma as La domestique
- Armand Lurville as Samuel d'Avray
- Jean Kolb as Lecoin
- Louis Scott as Le marquis
- André Dubosc as Auguste
- Paul Amiot as Supervielle
- Emile Seylis as Le turfiste

== See also ==
- The Levy Department Stores (1932)
- The Marriages of Mademoiselle Levy (1936)

== Bibliography ==
- Bessy, Maurice & Chirat, Raymond. Histoire du cinéma français: 1935-1939. Pygmalion, 1986.
- Bowles, Brett. Marcel Pagnol. Manchester University Press, 2021.
- Crisp, Colin. Genre, Myth and Convention in the French Cinema, 1929-1939. Indiana University Press, 2002.
- Rège, Philippe. Encyclopedia of French Film Directors, Volume 1. Scarecrow Press, 2009.
