= The Abbot Constantine =

The Abbot Constantine (French:L'abbé Constantin) may refer to:

- The Abbot Constantine (novel), an 1882 novel by Ludovic Halevy
- The Abbot Constantine (1925 film), a silent film adaptation directed by Julien Duvivier
- The Abbot Constantine (1933 film), a sound film adaptation directed by Jean-Paul Paulin
