= Three Telegrams =

1950 film

- Directed by: Henri Decoin
- Written by: Alex Joffé; Henri Decoin
- Produced by: Émile Natan
- Starring: Gérard Gervais; Pierrette Simonet; Olivier Hussenot
- Cinematography: Nicolas Hayer
- Edited by: Annick Millet
- Music by: Joseph Kosma
- Production companies: Union Générale Cinématographique (UGC); Les Films Modernes
- Distributed by: Alliance Générale de Distribution Cinématographique (AGDC)
- Release date: 3 November 1950
- Running time: 97 minutes
- Country: France
- Language: French

Three Telegrams (French: Trois télégrammes) is a 1950 French drama film directed by Henri Decoin and starring Gérard Gervais, Pierrette Simonet and Olivier Hussenot. The film's art direction was by Auguste Capelier. It was made at the Billancourt Studios in Paris.

== Cast ==
- Gérard Gervais as Antoine Letourneur, le petit télégraphiste.
- Pierrette Simonet as Amélie
- Olivier Hussenot as Le commissaire de police
- Christian Fourcade as Un petit garçon
- Henri Crémieux as Le directeur de l'école
- Jacques Tarride as M. Grandjean
- Germaine Michel as La bouquetière
- Henri Marchand as Joseph, le concierge de l'école
- Flore Falvey as Harmonica Player, Theme Music
- Lucien Arnaud
- Léon Bary
- Denise Berley
- Jean Berton as Edouard
- Léon Berton as Le curé
- Paul Bisciglia
- Jacqueline Carlier as La mère d'Arthur
- Claudy Chapeland as Arthur
- René-Jean Chauffard
- Jean Clarieux as Le capitaine des pompiers
- André Darnay as Le receveur de la poste
- Gérard Darrieu
- Guy Derlan
- Pierre Ferval
- Émile Genevois as Le concierge
- Madeleine Gérôme as Mme Grandjean
- René Hell as Le facteur
- Jaspar
- Nina Lazareff
- Marcel Loche as Le boucher
- Yette Lucas as Une passante
- Mag-Avril
- Franck Maurice
- Henri Maïk
- Marthe Mercadier as Une passante
- Albert Michel as Le cafetier
- Frédérique Nadar
- Bernard Plumet as Un petit garçon
- Jacques Provins as Un agent de police
- Yves Robert as Sergent Chauvin
- Raymond Soukoff as Le camionneur

== Bibliography ==
- Rège, Philippe. Encyclopedia of French Film Directors, Volume 1. Scarecrow Press, 2009.
