= Leyat =

French automobile manufacturer

Leyat, Automobiles Leyat
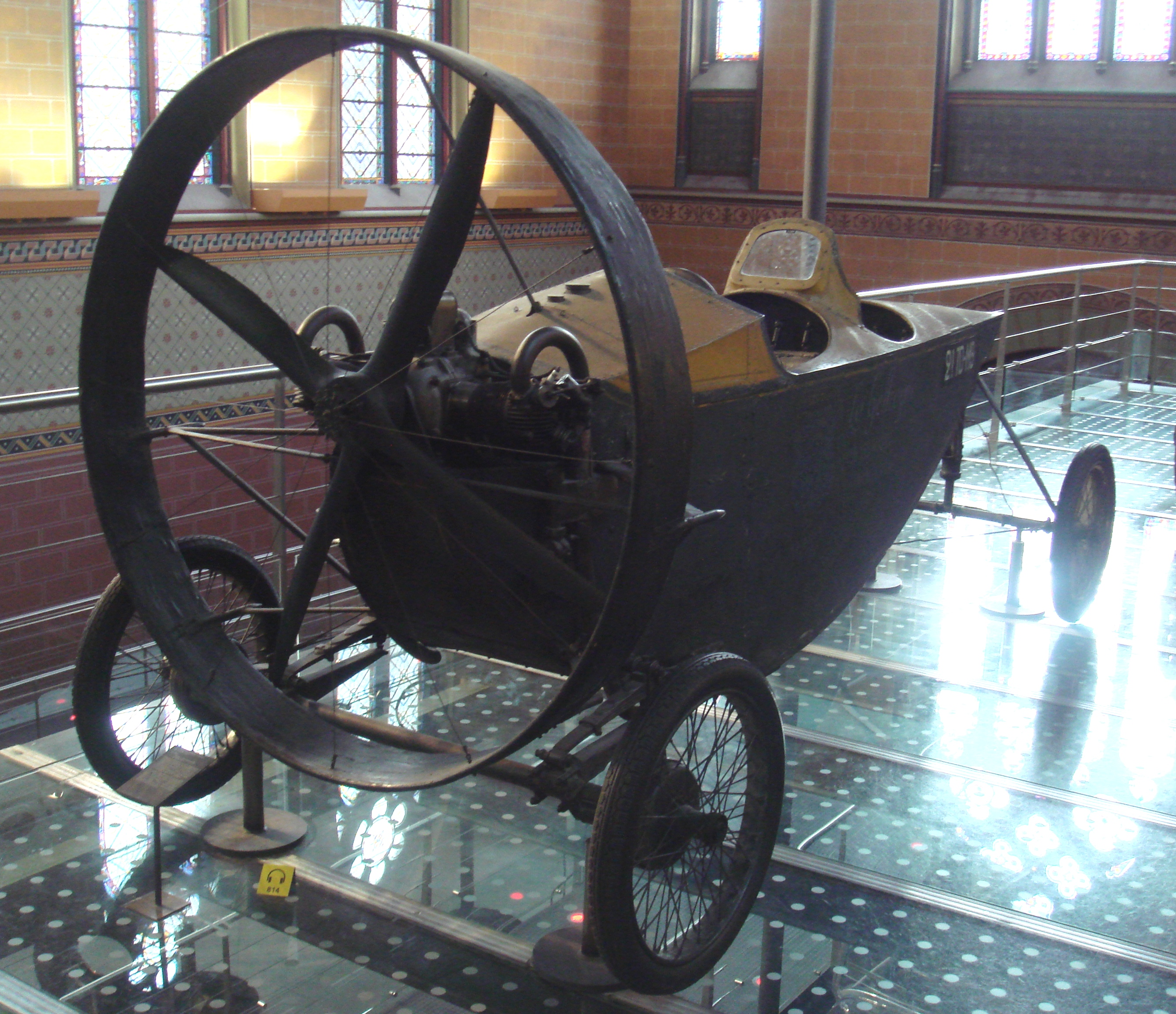
- The Hélica (1921), at the Musée des Arts et Métiers, Paris.
- Founded: 1913
- Defunct: 1927
- Headquarters: Paris, France
- Number of locations: Quai de Grenelle in the 15th arrondissement, Paris.
- Key people: Marcel Leyat (born in Die).
- Products: Automobiles

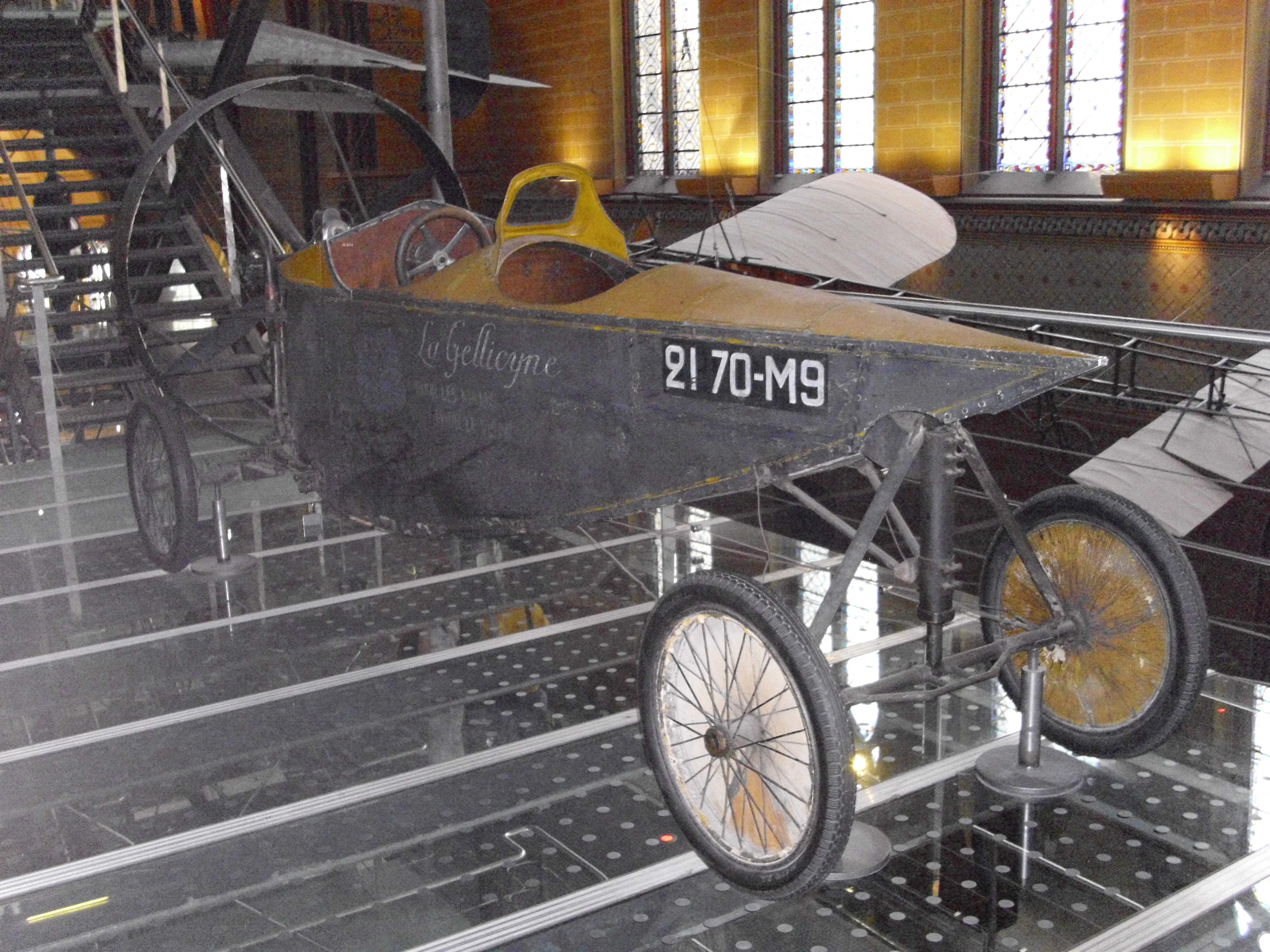
The Leyat, 1921

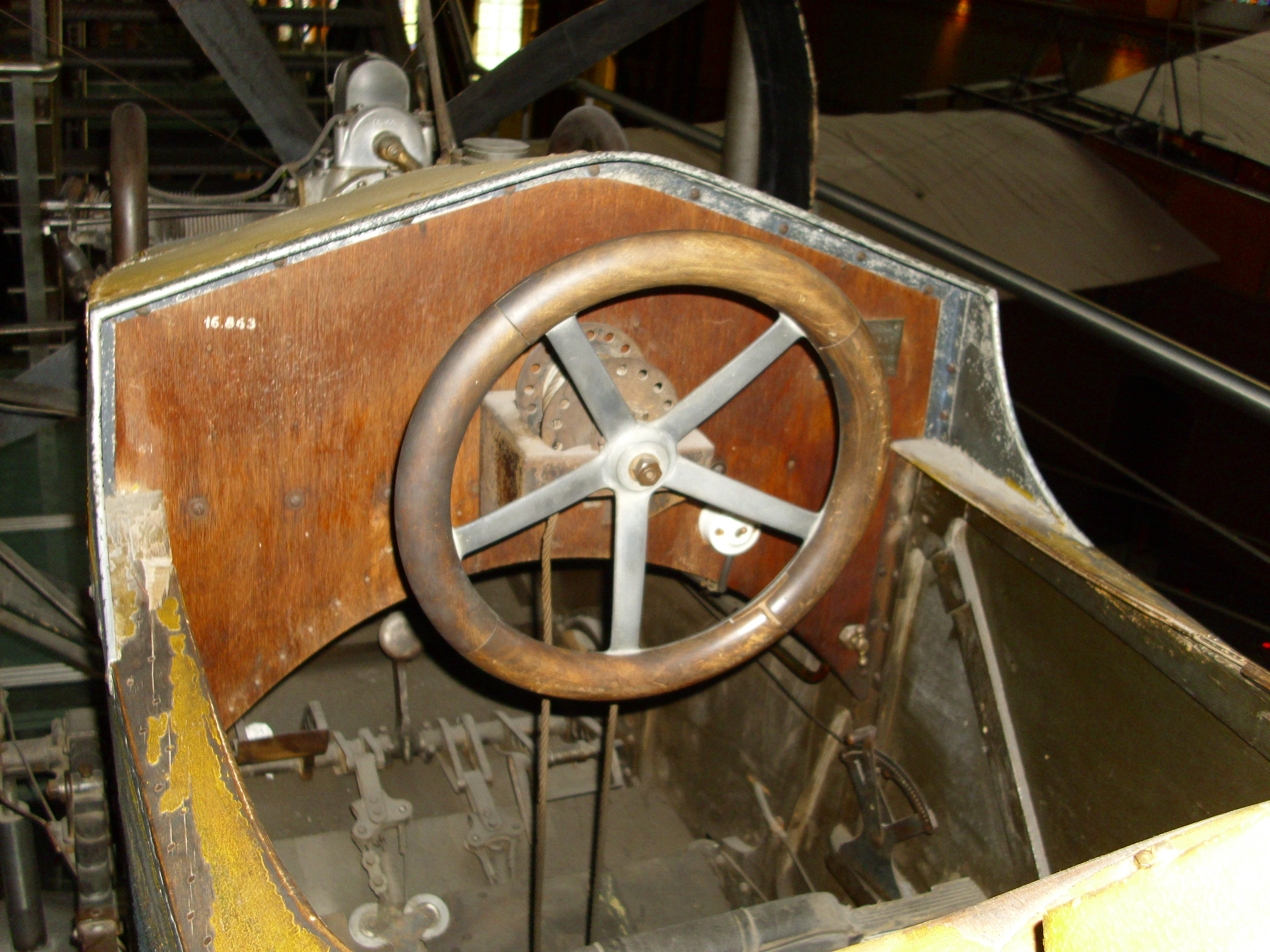
Leyat interior

Leyat, Automobiles Leyat was a French automobile manufacturer, established in 1919 in Paris by Marcel Leyat.

The Hélica was known as 'The plane without wings'. The passengers sat behind each other like in an aircraft, which was driven by a giant propeller powered by an 8 bhp (6.0 kW) Scorpion engine. The body of the vehicle was made of plywood.

The factory was on the Quai de Grenelle in the 15th arrondissement.

== Marcel Leyat ==
Marcel Leyat (March 26, 1885 (Die, Drôme) - December 3, 1986) was an engineer, inventor, aviation pioneer, and aeronautical and automobile manufacturer. He graduated from the École Centrale Paris in 1907. From 1908, he worked for the Société Astra and built a biplane glider called the Quand Quelle (When, which). In 1909 he targeted "the first powered crossing of the English Channel", but Louis Blériot succeeded on July 21, three weeks before his De Dion-Bouton 5 hp powered plane completed a flight of 200 metres (220 yd) at 10 metres (33 ft) elevation on August 15. In 1910, he built a propeller-driven biplane 11 metres (36 ft) long and 16 metres (52 ft) wide. He obtained the FAI pilot's license in 1911. During the First World War, he built several aircraft, including a "living wing" bomber. In all, he designed and built around thirty different aircraft up to World War II.

== Description ==
The first model was called Hélica, also known as 'The plane without wings'. The passengers sat behind each other as if they were in an aircraft. The vehicle was steered using the rear wheels and the car was not powered by an engine turning the wheels, but by a giant propeller powered by an 8 bhp (6.0 kW) Scorpion engine. The entire body of the vehicle was made of plywood, and weighed just 250 kg (550 lb), which made it dangerously fast.

=== Performance ===
In 1927, a Hélica reached the speed of 106 mph (171 km/h) at the Autodrome de Linas-Montlhéry circuit. Leyat continued to experiment with his Helica. He tried using propellers with two and four blades.

=== Production ===
Between 1919 and 1925, Leyat sold 30 vehicles.

== Vehicle models ==
- 1913: Helicocycle, 3 wheels, JAP engine, only one example
- 1915: Hélicocycle, 3 wheels, version 2, only one copy
- 1919: Hélica, 4 wheels, MAG engine, 6 examples
- 1921: Leyat propeller car, 4 wheels, ABC engine, 10 sedan cars, 3 sport cabriolet cars
- 1925: Rail/road draisine, intended for the director of mines in the Congo, 1 copy
- 1927: Record model, 3 wheels, ABC engine, 1 copy. On September 7, 1927, it reached a speed of 170 km/h on the Montlhéry race track.

=== Gallery ===
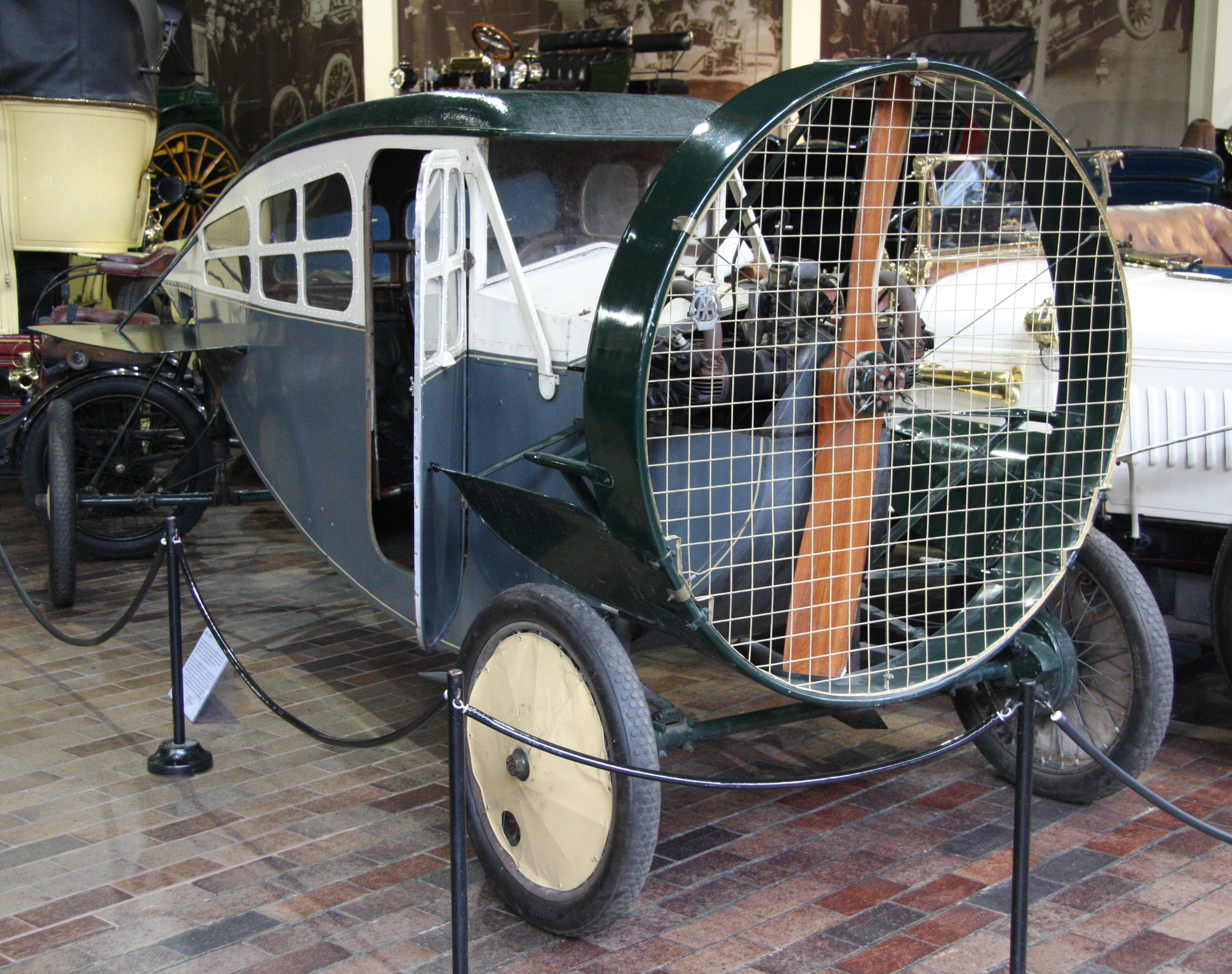
1922 Leyat at National Motor Museum, Beaulieu

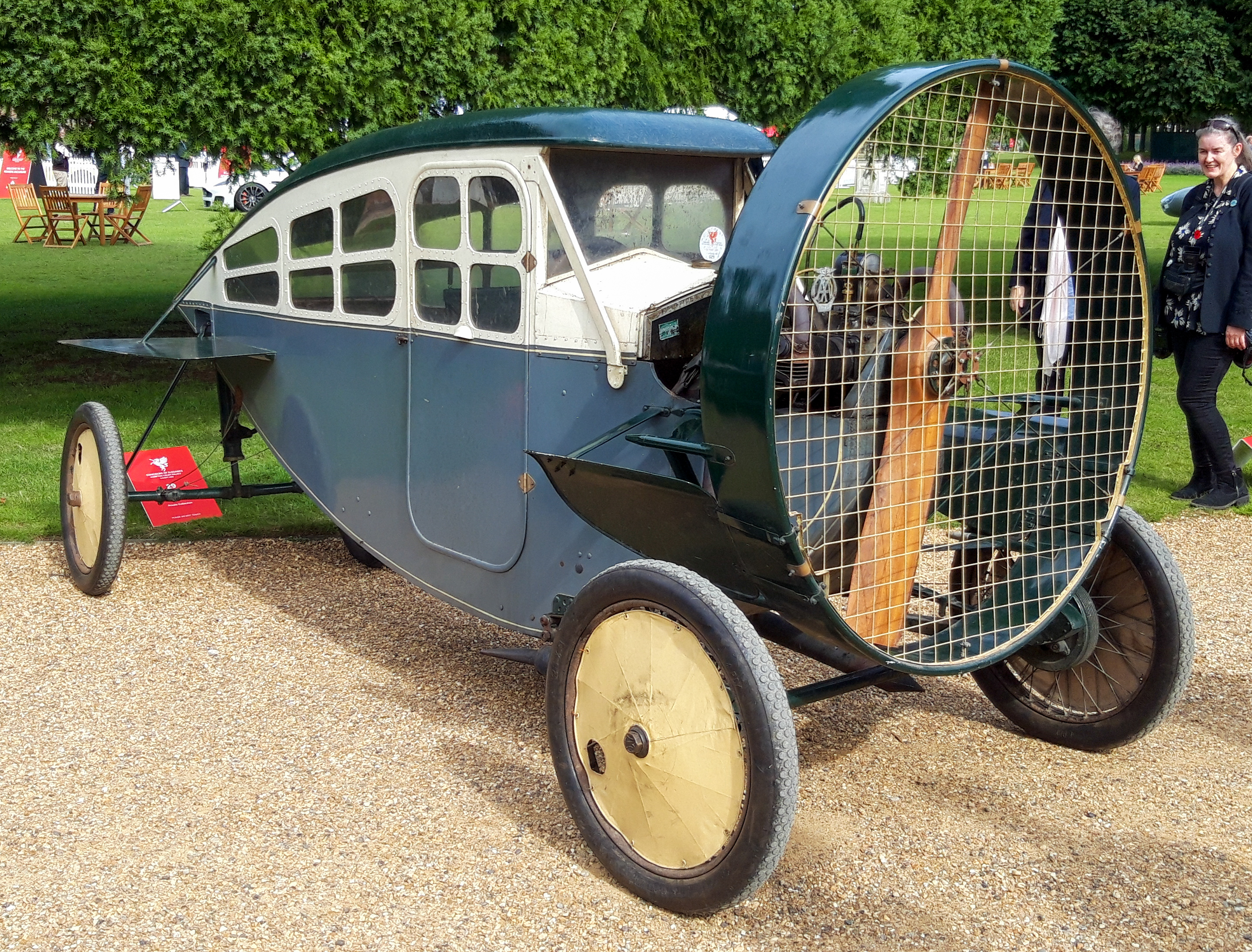
. 1922 Leyat Hélica (Hampton Court Concours d'Elegance 2020)

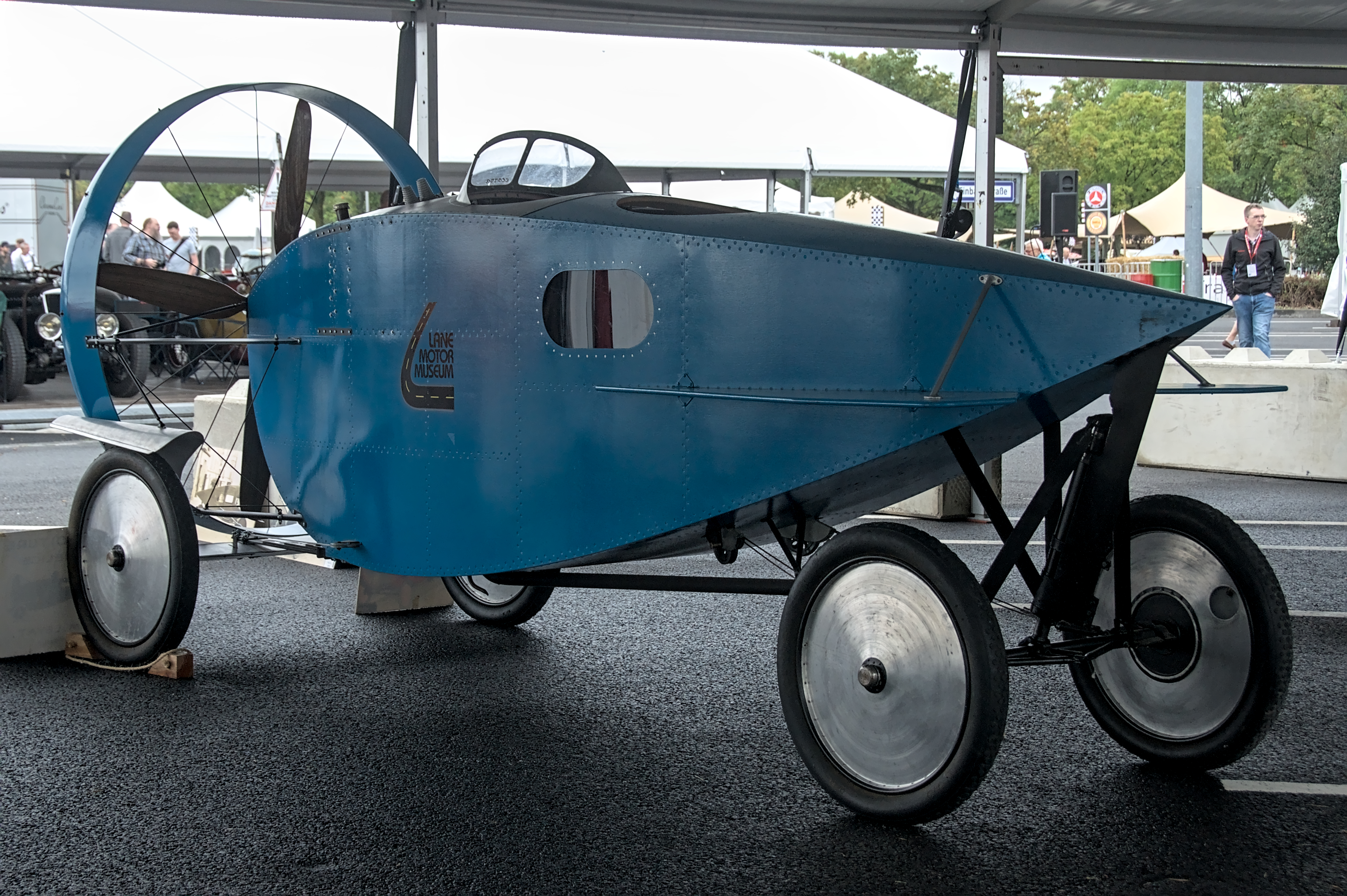
Helice Leyat (Classic-Days 2022)

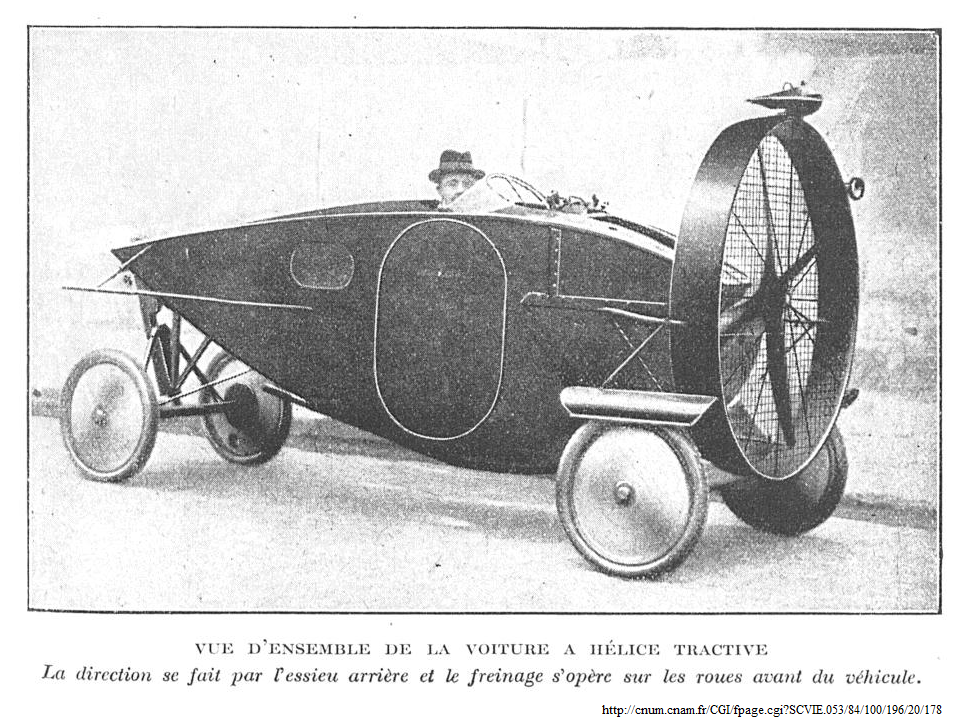
(Vue d'ensemble de la voiture a Hélice Tractive. La direction se fait par l'essieu arriere, et le frienage s'opere sur les roues avant du vehicule.)
General view of the car with Tractive Propeller. The steering is by the rear axle, and the breaking operates on the front wheels of the vehicle.
(La science et la vie, Tome 18. n. 53. Octobre-Novembre 1920 - Article d'Édouard Beaugrand.)

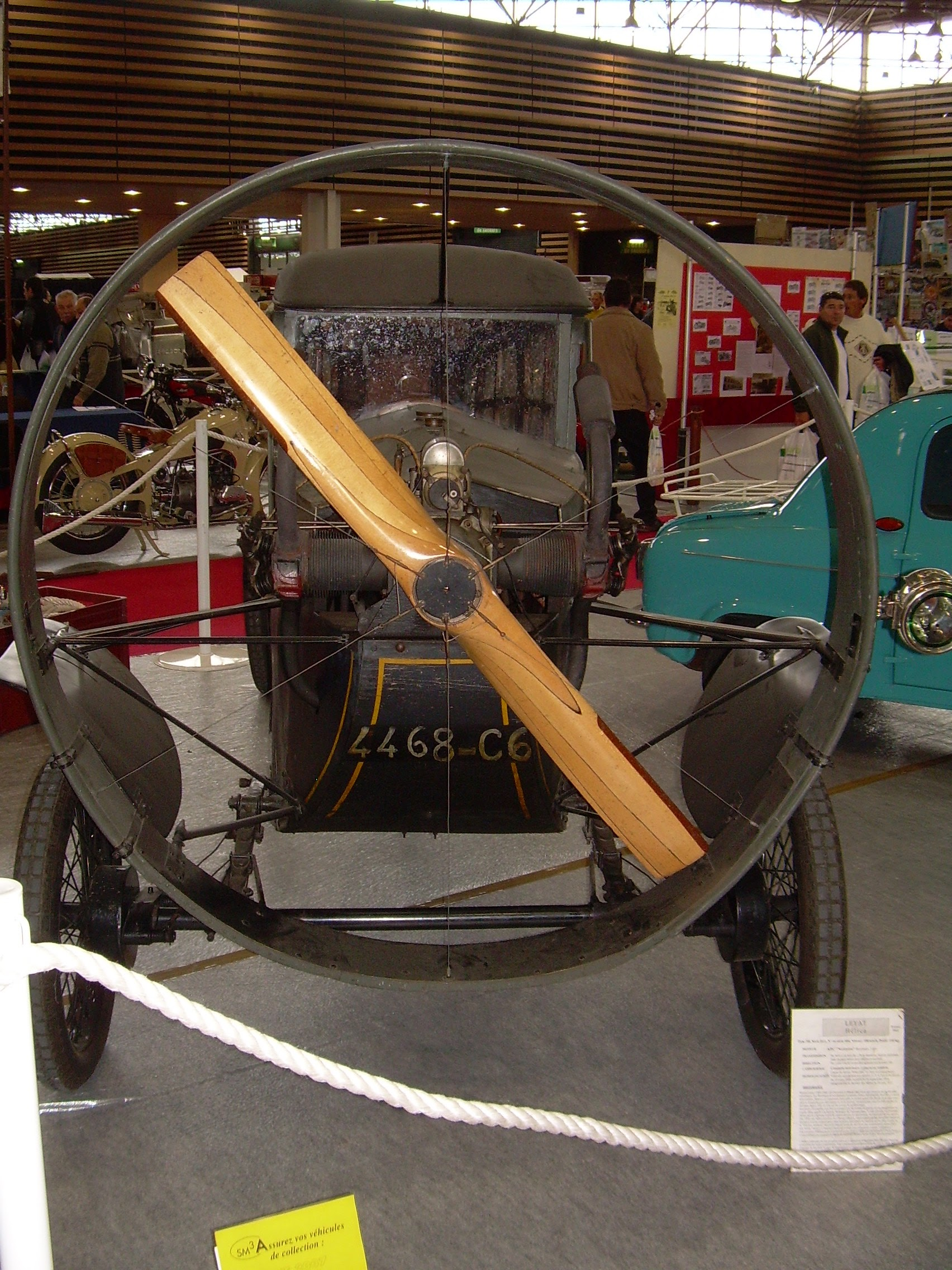
Helice Leyat (Epoqu'auto 2007)

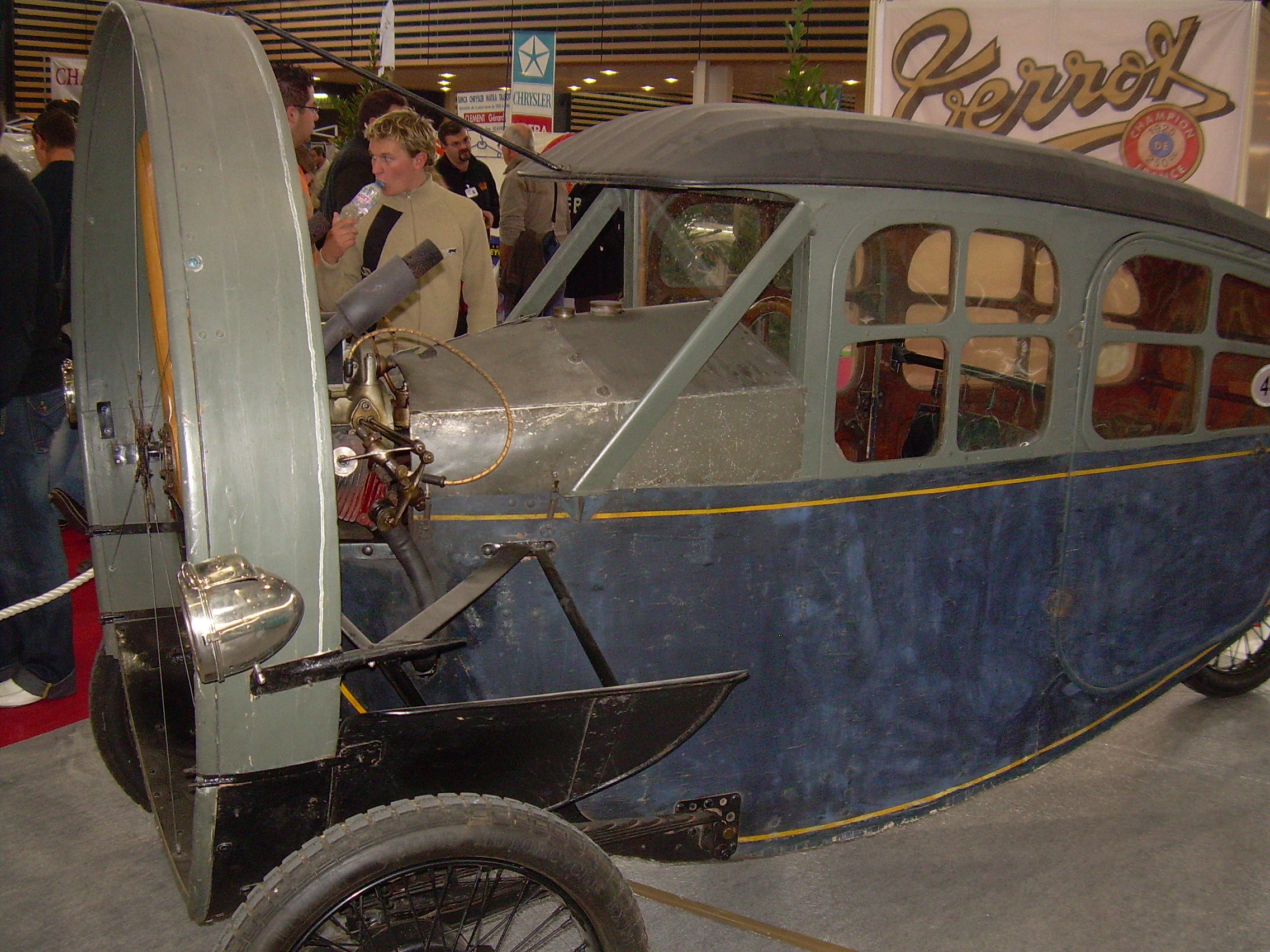
Helice Leyat (Epoqu'auto 2007)

== Literature ==
- G. N. Georgano: The Beaulieu Encyclopedia of the Automobile. Volume 2: G–O. Fitzroy Dearborn Publishers, Chicago 2001, ISBN 1-57958-293-1.
- G. N. Georgano: Complete Automobile Encyclopedia. 1885 to Our Times. Courtille, Paris 1975.
