= Charlemagne (film) =

1933 film directed by Pierre Colombier

- Spanish poster
- Directed by: Pierre Colombier
- Written by: Yves Mirande
- Based on: The Admirable Crichton by J.M. Barrie
- Starring: Raimu; Léon Belières; Marie Glory
- Cinematography: Raymond Agnel; René Colas
- Edited by: Léonide Moguy
- Music by: Jacques Dallin
- Production company: Pathé-Natan
- Distributed by: Pathé-Natan
- Release date: 22 December 1933
- Running time: 90 minutes
- Country: France
- Language: French

Charlemagne is a 1933 French comedy drama film directed by Pierre Colombier and starring Raimu, Léon Belières and Marie Glory. A group of upper-class passengers on a ship are saved by a stoker who takes them to an island, where he soon rises to be their monarch. The film is based on the 1902 play The Admirable Crichton by J. M. Barrie.

== Synopsis ==
An arrogant baron, his mistress and several others are stranded on a desert island during a shipwreck. The crew member Charlemagne grows tired of the aristocrat's behaviour and, being by far the most capable, declares himself ruler of the island. This situation lasts until the castaways are at last rescued by another vessel.

== Cast ==
- Raimu as le matelot Charlemagne
- Marie Glory as Rose Val
- Léon Bélières as le docteur
- Jean Dax as le baron
- Gaston Jacquet as le directeur
- Lucien Baroux as l'auteur
- Christian-Gérard as Bardac
- Auguste Mouriès as le capitaine
- Pierre Piérade as Malet

== Bibliography ==
- Oscherwitz, Dayna & Higgins, MaryEllen. The A to Z of French Cinema. Scarecrow Press, 2009.
