= Topaze (1936 film) =

1936 film

- Directed by: Marcel Pagnol
- Written by: Marcel Pagnol (play)
- Produced by: Marcel Pagnol
- Starring: Alexandre Arnaudy; Sylvia Bataille; Pierre Asso
- Cinematography: Albert Assouad
- Music by: Vincent Scotto
- Production company: Les Films Marcel Pagnol
- Release date: 1936
- Country: France
- Language: French

Topaze is a 1936 French comedy film directed by Marcel Pagnol and starring Alexandre Arnaudy, Sylvia Bataille and Pierre Asso. It is based on the Pagnol's own 1928 play Topaze. A separate adaptation Topaze had been directed by Louis J. Gasnier three years earlier.

== Cast ==
- Arnaudy as Topaze
- Sylvia Bataille as Ernestine Muche
- Pierre Asso as Tamise
- Jean Arbuleau as Roger de Berville
- Léon Belières as Régis de Castel-Bénac
- Henri Poupon as le vieillard
- Alida Rouffe as la baronne de Pitart-Vergnolles
- Délia Col as Suzy Courtois
- Jean Castan as un élève
- Paul Demange
- Léon Brouzet as M. Muche
- André Pollack

== Bibliography ==
- Goble, Alan. The Complete Index to Literary Sources in Film. Walter de Gruyter, 1999.
