= The Eaglet (1931 film) =

1931 film directed by Viktor Tourjansky

- Directed by: Viktor Tourjansky
- Written by: Edmond Rostand (play); Wolfgang Goetz; Adolf E. Licho; Pierre-Gilles Veber
- Produced by: Adolphe Osso
- Starring: Jean Weber; Victor Francen; Henri Desfontaines
- Cinematography: Nikolai Toporkoff
- Edited by: Andrée Danis; Tonka Taldy
- Music by: Edouard Flament
- Production company: Les Films Osso
- Distributed by: Les Films Osso
- Release date: 28 August 1931
- Running time: 109 minutes
- Country: France
- Language: French

The Eaglet (French: L'aiglon) is a 1931 French historical drama film directed by Viktor Tourjansky and starring Jean Weber, Victor Francen, and Henri Desfontaines. It is an adaptation of the play L'Aiglon by Edmond Rostand, which portrays the life of Napoleon II. It was shot at the Joinville Studios in Paris. The film's sets were designed by the art director Serge Piménoff.

A separate German-language version The Duke of Reichstadt was also made. It was directed by Tourjansky but featuring a different cast.

== Cast ==
- Jean Weber as L'aiglon (Napoleon II)
- Victor Francen as Flambeau
- Henri Desfontaines as Metternich
- Simone Vaudry as Thérèse de Lorget
- Georges Colin as Le maréchal Marmont
- Jeanne Boitel as La comtesse Camerata
- Gustave Berthier as Gentz
- Henri Kerny as Sedlinsky
- Jenny Hélia as L'impératrice Marie-Louise
- Roger Blum as Prokesch
- Fordyce as Fanny Elssler
- de Kerdec as Tiburce
- Henri Debain as Le sergent
- Camille Beuve as Le général Hartmann
- Raymond de Boncour as Le tailleur
- Nilda Duclos as L'archiduchesse
- Jean Diéner as Le docteur
- Émile Drain as Napoléon
- Georges Deneubourg
- Alexandre Mathillon

== Bibliography ==
- Goble, Alan. The Complete Index to Literary Sources in Film. Walter de Gruyter, 1999.
