= Madeleine Lambert =

French actress

- Born: 7 May 1892; Saint-Pierre-Bénouville, Seine-Maritime, France
- Died: 24 July 1977 (aged 85); Peymeinade, Alpes-Maritimes, France
- Occupation: Actress
- Years active: 1921-1968 (film )

Madeleine Lambert (1892–1977) was a French stage, television and film actress.

== Filmography ==
Year	Title	Role	Notes
1931	My Cousin from Warsaw	Lucienne	
1937	L'amour veille	Sophie	
1938	The Curtain Rises	Élisabeth	
1940	Threats	La patronne de l'hôtel	
1945	Father Serge	La comtesse Varvara Alexandrovna Kedrov	
1948	Emile the African	Madame Cormier	
1949	Branquignol	La marquise de Pressailles	
1951	Two Pennies Worth of Violets	Une amie	
1951	Une histoire d'amour	Une invitée	Uncredited
1952	La Vérité sur Bébé Donge	Madame d'Onneville	
1952	Leathernose	Une invitée	
1954	Les révoltés de Lomanach	La comtesse	Uncredited
1955	Marguerite de la nuit	L'admiratrice de l'Opéra	Uncredited
1956	Mademoiselle Pigalle	Headmistress	
1956	The Bride Is Much Too Beautiful	Aunt Agnes	
1957	Charming Boys	Madame Micoulin	
1959	Les Liaisons dangereuses	Mme Rosemonde	
1965	Passeport diplomatique agent K 8	La tante	
1966	A nous deux, Paris!	Mme Hagueauner mère	
1968	You Only Love Once		(final film role)

== Bibliography ==
- Goble, Alan. The Complete Index to Literary Sources in Film. Walter de Gruyter, 1999.
