= Côte d'Azur (1932 film) =

1932 film

- Directed by: Roger Capellani
- Written by: André Birabeau (play); Georges Dolley (play) Benno Vigny
- Starring: Simone Héliard; Robert Burnier; Robert Arnoux
- Cinematography: Fred Langenfeld
- Production company: Les Studios Paramount
- Distributed by: Les Films Paramount
- Release date: 8 July 1932
- Running time: 103 minutes
- Country: France
- Language: French

Côte d'Azur is a 1932 French comedy film directed by Roger Capellani and starring Simone Héliard, Robert Burnier and Robert Arnoux. It was produced by the French subsidiary of Paramount Pictures at the company's Joinville Studios in Paris.

== Synopsis ==
Hélène is a telephone operator who is in love with her boss, who unfortunately never looks at her. During a trip to the Côte d'Azur however, she makes her fall in love with him.

== Cast ==
- Simone Héliard as Hélène
- Robert Burnier as Léon Brodier
- Yvonne Hébert as Suzanne
- Robert Arnoux as Anselme Duval
- Marcel Vallée as Albert Renoux
- Pierre Palau as Fondoy
- Paul Clerget as Cazin
- Ketti Gallian as Yvonne Casin
- Sam Pierce as Barman
- Pierre Sergeol as Antonio

== Bibliography ==
- Bessy, Maurice & Chirat, Raymond. Histoire du cinéma français: 1929-1934. Pygmalion, 1988.
- Crisp, Colin. Genre, Myth and Convention in the French Cinema, 1929-1939. Indiana University Press, 2002.
- Rège, Philippe. Encyclopedia of French Film Directors, Volume 1. Scarecrow Press, 2009.
