= Maldone =

1928 film

Misdeal
- French language poster
- Directed by: Jean Grémillon
- Written by: Alexandre Arnoux
- Produced by: Charles Dullin
- Starring: Charles Dullin; Marcelle Dullin; Geymond Vital
- Cinematography: Christian Matras; Georges Périnal
- Edited by: Emmanuel Nicolas; Henriette Pinson
- Music by: Jacques Brilloin; Marcel Delannoy; Jean Grémillon
- Production company: La Société des Films Charles Dullin
- Release date: 14 September 1928
- Country: France
- Languages: Silent; French intertitles

Misdeal (French: Maldone) is a 1928 French silent drama film directed by Jean Grémillon and starring Charles Dullin, Marcelle Dullin and Geymond Vital. The film's sets were designed by art director André Barsacq.

== Synopsis ==
The film tells the story of a wealthy young man flees from his family's estate, and finds employment as a canal worker. He falls in love with a gypsy girl, but when a death in the family requires him to return home and run his estate, he marries a neighbor's daughter. Years later, he becomes obsessed with his old lover after a chance meeting.

== Cast ==
- Charles Dullin as Olivier Maldone
- Marcelle Dullin as Missia, la voyante
- Geymond Vital as Marcellin Maldone
- André Bacqué as Juste Maldone, l'oncle
- George Seroff as Léonard, le serviteur
- Annabella as Flora Lévigné
- Roger Karl as Lévigné père
- Mathilde Alberti as L'épicière
- Lucien Arnaud as Le voyageur
- Genica Athanasiou as Zita
- Edmond Beauchamp as Le gitan
- Alexej Bondireff as Le patron de la péniche
- Gabrielle Fontan
- Isabelle Kloucowski as La gitane
- Charles Lavialle as Le facteur
- Daniel Lecourtois as Un danseur
- Jean Mamy as Un marinier

== Bibliography ==
- Levine, Alison. Framing the Nation: Documentary Film in Interwar France. A&C Black, 2011.
