= Jean Coquelin =

French actor (1865–1944)

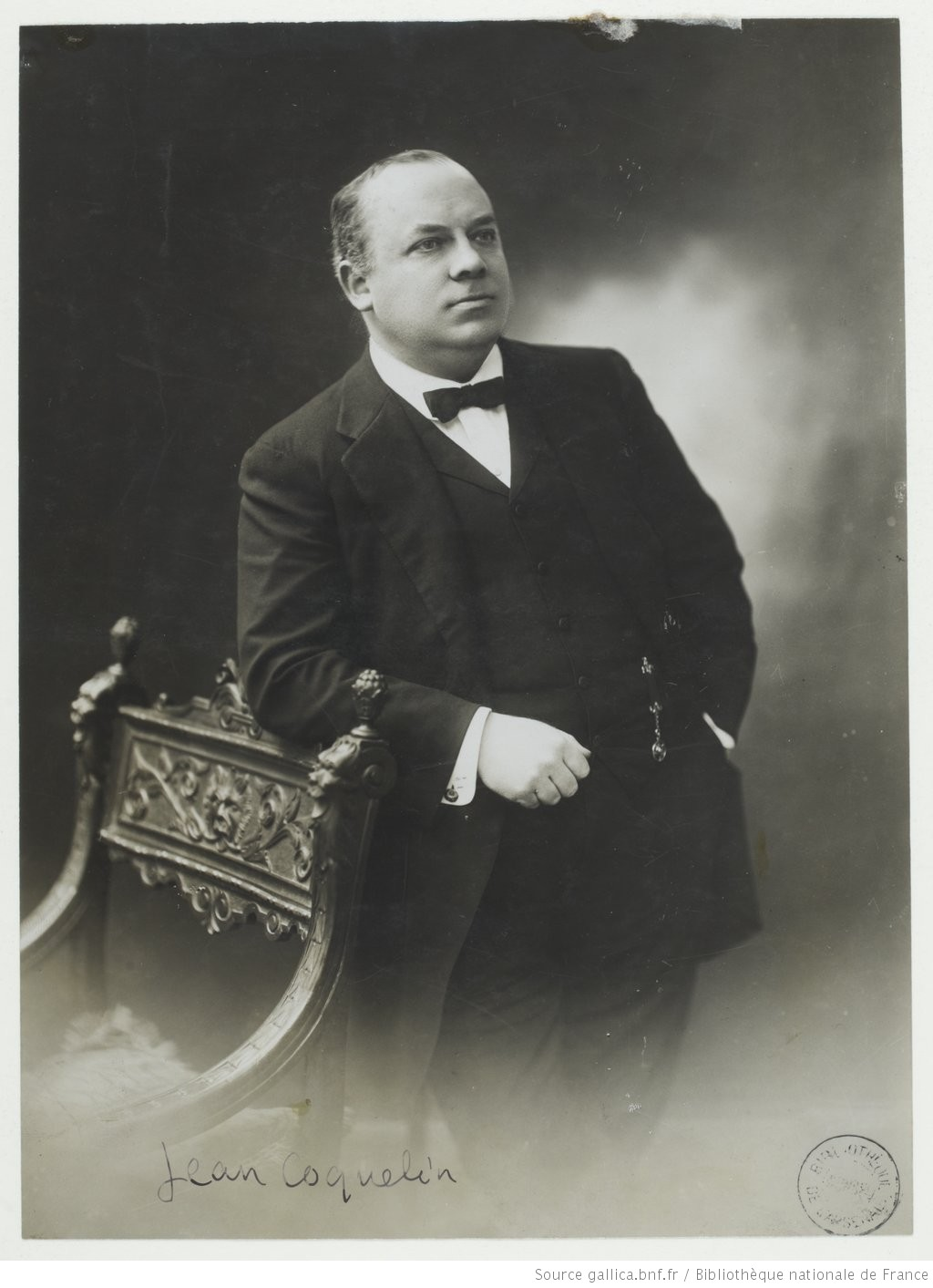
Jean Coquelin

Jean Coquelin (1865–1944) was a French film and stage actor and the son of Benoît-Constant Coquelin.

== Filmography ==
Year	Title	Role	Notes
1925	The Abbot Constantine	L'abbé Constantin	
1927	La maison sans amour		
1931	David Golder	Fischel	
1932	A Dog That Pays Off		
1932	Monsieur de Pourceaugnac	Oronte	
1933	La Roche aux mouettes	Le curé	
1933	In Old Alsace	Christel	
1936	Let's Make a Dream	Un invité	(prologue)
1937	Les Perles de la couronne	Le vieux bourgeois	
1937	La Chanson du souvenir	Bibliotécaire	
1938	Café de Paris	Le second traficant d'armes	
1938	Remontons les Champs-Élysées	L'apothicaire	
1939	The End of the Day	Delormel	
1942	Caprices	Le vieux monsieur	
1942	Last Adventure		
1942	Le Destin fabuleux de Désirée Clary	Le greffier	
1943	The Count of Monte Cristo	Le médecin	Uncredited
1943	La Main du diable	Le notaire	Uncredited, (final film role)

== Bibliography ==
- Finkielman, Jorge. The Film Industry in Argentina: an Illustrated Cultural History. McFarland & Co, 2004.
- Hartnoll, Phyllis, editor (1983). The Oxford Companion to the Theatre (fourth edition). Oxford: Oxford University Press. ISBN 9780192115461.
