= Henriette Pinson =

French film editor

- Occupation: Film editor
- Years active: 1927–1943

Henriette Pinson was a French film editor active from the 1920s through the 1940s.

== Selected filmography ==
- Le brigand gentilhomme (1943)
- Last Adventure (1942)
- The Fraudster (1937)
- Misdeal (1928)
- Napoleon (1927) (associate editor)
