= Southern Cross (1932 film) =

1932 film

- Directed by: André Hugon
- Written by: Paul Achard; André Hugon
- Starring: Charles de Rochefort; Suzanne Christy; Alexandre Mihalesco
- Cinematography: Raymond Agnel; Charles de Rochefort
- Production company: Films André Hugon
- Distributed by: Pathé-Natan
- Release date: 13 May 1932
- Running time: 92 minutes
- Country: France
- Language: French

Southern Cross (French: La croix du sud) is a 1932 French drama film directed by André Hugon and starring Charles de Rochefort, Suzanne Christy and Alexandre Mihalesco. It was filmed at the Joinville Studios and on location in Africa. The film's sets were designed by the art director Christian-Jaque. The storyline includes "miscegnation" and an African chief who chooses an African woman over a white woman.

== Synopsis ==
Aftan, a Berber leader, rescues a young Frenchwoman Madeleine Ménard from an attack by bandits. She falls in love with him and a marriage is arranged, but he concludes that the cultural barrier is too great and returns to the beautiful native woman who he had loved before.

== Cast ==
- Charles de Rochefort as Aftan
- Kaissa Robba as Dassine
- Alexandre Mihalesco as Arbi
- Suzanne Christy as Madeleine Ménard
- Jean Toulout as Le professeur Ménard
- Jean Heuzé as Lieutenant Darsène
- Tahar Hanache as Le chef nomade
- Christian-Jaque as Un lieutenant

== Bibliography ==
- Rège, Philippe. Encyclopedia of French Film Directors, Volume 1. Scarecrow Press, 2009.
