= The Marriages of Mademoiselle Levy =

1936 film

- Directed by: André Hugon
- Written by: Georges Fagot; André Falco; Harry Harment
- Produced by: André Hugon
- Starring: Yvette Lebon; Charles Lamy; Pierre Mingand
- Cinematography: Marc Bujard; Tahar Hanache
- Music by: Jacques Janin
- Production company: Films André Hugon
- Distributed by: Cinéma de France
- Release date: 16 October 1936
- Running time: 93 minutes
- Country: France
- Language: French

The Marriages of Mademoiselle Levy (French: Les mariages de Mademoiselle Lévy) is a 1936 French comedy film directed by André Hugon and starring Yvette Lebon, Charles Lamy and Pierre Mingand. It is the fourth and final entry in a series of films beginning with Levy and Company in 1930. The film's sets were designed by the art director Robert-Jules Garnier.

== Synopsis ==
In a small town in Alsace the Levy brothers have a tailoring business which is in trouble due to the competition of a rival Cohen. Matters are further complicated by Minna, the daughter of Solomon Levy, who refuses to make a wealthy marriage match.

== Cast ==
- Yvette Lebon as Minna Lévy
- Charles Lamy as Salomon
- Pierre Mingand as Pierre
- André Burgère as Gaston Berheim
- Délia Col as Françoise
- Jean Wall as Serge Wolff
- Armand Lurville as Jacob
- Jules Moy as Isaac Cohen
- Léon Belières as Moïse
- Gaston Séverin as Le comte de Rochemaille

== Bibliography ==
- Philippe Rège. Encyclopedia of French Film Directors, Volume 1. Scarecrow Press, 2009.
