= Bettina Loved a Soldier =

1916 film by Rupert Julian

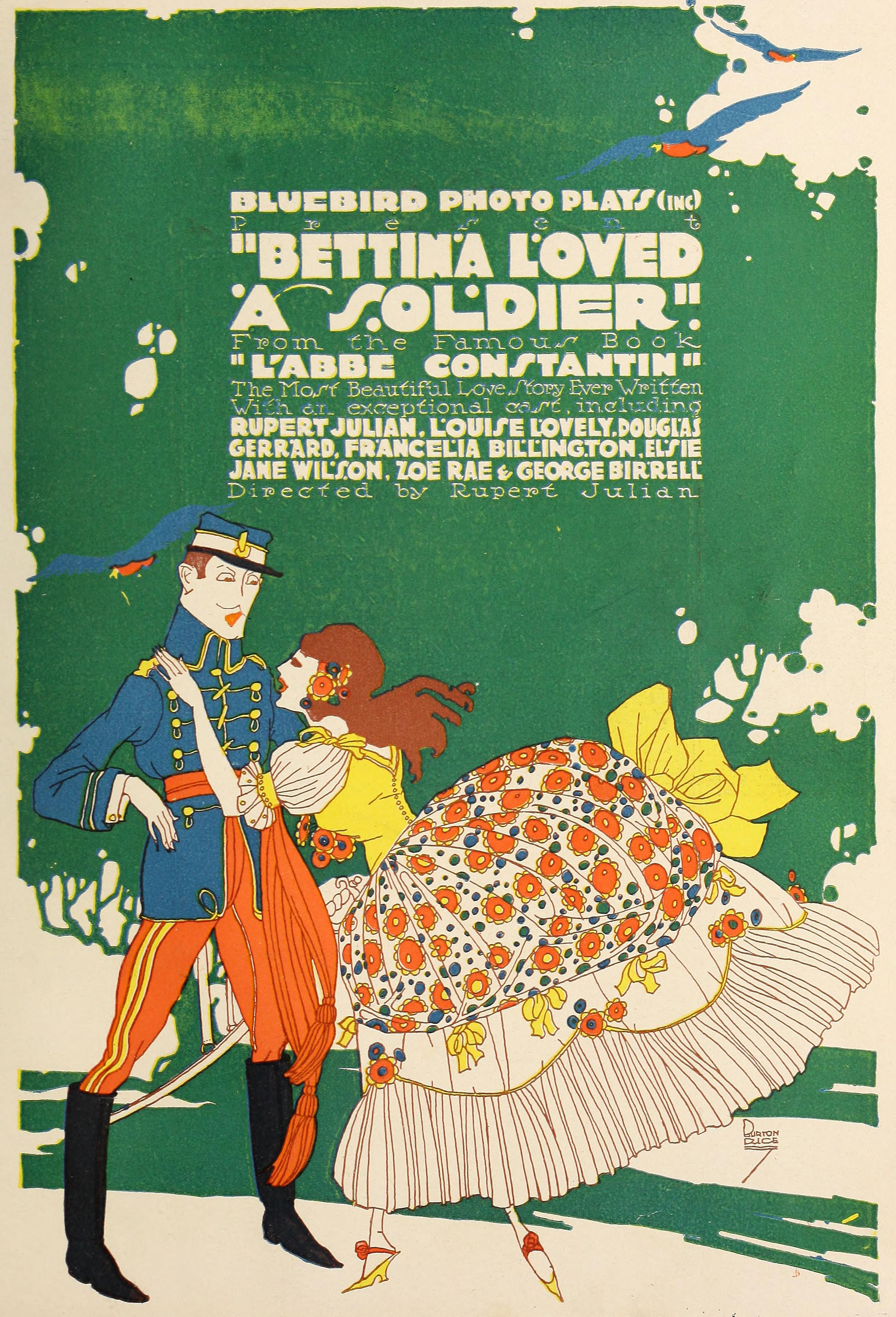
- Directed by: Rupert Julian
- Written by: Elliott J. Clawson
- Based on: The Abbot Constantine by Ludovic Halévy
- Cinematography: Stephen Rounds
- Production company: Universal Film Manufacturing Company
- Distributed by: Universal Film Manufacturing Company
- Release date: August 14, 1916
- Running time: 50 minutes
- Country: United States
- Language: Silent (English intertitles)

Bettina Loved a Soldier is a 1916 American silent comedy film directed by Rupert Julian and starring Louise Lovely, George Berrell, and Francelia Billington. Made by Universal Pictures, it is based on the 1882 French novel The Abbot Constantine by Ludovic Halévy.

== Cast ==
- Louise Lovely as Bettina Scott
- George Berrell as Abbé Constantin
- Rupert Julian as Jean Reynaud
- Francelia Billington as Suzie Scott
- Zoe Rae as Bella
- Douglas Gerrard as Paul de Lacardens
- Elsie Jane Wilson as Pauline

== Preservation ==
- It is now a lost film.

== Bibliography ==
- Goble, Alan. The Complete Index to Literary Sources in Film. Walter de Gruyter, 1999.
