= The Exile's Song =

1943 film

- Directed by: André Hugon
- Written by: Yves Mirande; André Hugon
- Produced by: Pierre Collard; André Hugon
- Starring: Tino Rossi; Ginette Leclerc; Aimé Clariond
- Cinematography: Raymond Agnel
- Edited by: Jean Sacha
- Music by: Henri Bourtayre
- Production companies: Les Films Collard; Les Productions André Hugon
- Distributed by: Cinéma de France
- Release date: 21 April 1943
- Running time: 90 minutes
- Country: France
- Language: French

The Exile's Song (French: Le chant de l'exilé) is a 1943 French musical drama film directed by André Hugon and starring Tino Rossi, Ginette Leclerc and Aimé Clariond. It was shot at the Cité Elgé Studios in Paris. The film's sets were designed by the art director Maurice Bernard. It was produced during the German Occupation of France.

== Synopsis ==
In the French Basque Country a young man works for his father a fruit and vegetable merchant. He enjoys life and is happily engaged but when he believes he has killed a man, even in self-defence, he flees to French Algeria. There are some struggle to gain work he enlists in the Sahara Pioneers.

== Cast ==
- Tino Rossi as Ramon Etcheverry
- Ginette Leclerc as Dolorès
- Aimé Clariond as Riedgo
- Gaby André as Maria
- Lucien Gallas as Jean
- Maurice Baquet as Gaspard 'Pas-Béni'
- Georges Colin as Carlos Carmossa
- Romuald Joubé as Pedro Etcheverry
- Jean Toulout as Le commandant Renard
- Lilia Vetti as Paquita
- Alexandre Mihalesco as Ali
- René Blancard as Itchoua
- Jean-Jacques Delbo as Le complice de Riedgo
- Georges Paulais as Le docteur
- Albert Gercourt as Manoel
- Alexandre Fabry as Le curé
- Luis Mariano as Un jeune basque

== Bibliography ==
- Powrie, Phil & Cadalanu, Marie. The French Film Musical. Bloomsbury Publishing, 2020.
- Rège, Philippe. Encyclopedia of French Film Directors, Volume 1. Scarecrow Press, 2009.
