= A Telephone Call =

1932 film

- Directed by: Georges Lacombe
- Written by: Charles Spaak
- Based on: A Telephone Call by Paul Gavault and Georges Berr
- Produced by: Manuel Chavez
- Starring: Jean Weber; Colette Darfeuil; Jeanne Boitel
- Cinematography: Nicolas Farkas
- Edited by: Jacques Desagneaux
- Music by: Adolphe Borchard
- Production company: Films Albatros
- Distributed by: Les Films Armor
- Release date: 25 March 1932
- Running time: 88 minutes
- Country: France
- Language: French

A Telephone Call (French: Un coup de téléphone) is a 1932 French comedy film directed by Georges Lacombe and starring Jean Weber, Colette Darfeuil and Jeanne Boitel. It is based on a play of the same title by Paul Gavault and Georges Berr. The film's sets were designed by the art directors Eugène Lourié, Lazare Meerson and Pierre Schild.

== Cast ==
- Jean Weber as Serpolet
- Colette Darfeuil as Evelyne
- Jeanne Boitel as Germaine
- Mauricet as Le docteur Lejonquois
- Alexandre Arnaudy as Cormainville
- Germaine Sablon as Mamette
- Léon Courtois a sM. Molleton
- Henri Vilbert as Cargouille
- Paulette Dubost as Clara
- Paul Velsa as Ferdinand
- Odette Talazac as Mme Molleton
- Suzanne Christy as Simone
- Max Lerel as Le fiancé
- Henri Étiévant as Octave
- Nita Malbert as Eugénie
- Jane Pierson as Rosine
- Émile Saint-Ober as Le notaire

== Bibliography ==
- Goble, Alan. The Complete Index to Literary Sources in Film. Walter de Gruyter, 1999.
- Rège, Philippe. Encyclopedia of French Film Directors, Volume 1. Scarecrow Press, 2009.
