= Colette Audry =

French novelist, screenwriter, and critic (1906–1990)

Colette Audry (6 July 1906 – 20 October 1990) was a French novelist, screenwriter, and critic.

Audry was born in Orange, Vaucluse. She won the Prix Médicis for the autobiographical novel Derrière la baignoire (Behind the Bathtub). As a screenwriter she first gained acclaim for The Battle for the Railway and also wrote for her sister Jacqueline. In politics she was a member of the Anti-Stalinist left (she was a member of the Workers and Peasants' Socialist Party) and an associate to Simone de Beauvoir. She died at Issy-les-Moulineaux, aged 84.

== Biography ==
Born into a Protestant family that had distanced itself from religion, Colette Audry's mother was Inès Combes, grand-niece of Gaston Doumergue. After her father, Charles Audry, who was close to socialist circles, joined the prefectural administration, she and her younger sister Jacqueline Audry spent part of their childhood in various postings: first in Nice, then in Ardèche in 1914, and finally in Côtes-du-Nord in 1918. It was only after her father was granted a leave of absence for health reasons, in 1920, that the family settled in Paris.

After a brilliant secondary education, she entered the École normale supérieure de jeunes filles, and obtained the agrégation de lettres for women in 1928. She began her teaching career at the Lycée Pasteur in Caen (1928-1930), then at the Lycée Jeanne-d'Arc in Rouen (1930-1936), where she met Paul Nizan, who introduced her to Simone de Beauvoir, with whom she remained friends until her death.

It was during this period that she became involved in militancy, through her school's amicale, where debates were essentially political. Under the influence of Communist teachers who were members of the amicale, she considered joining the French Communist Party, but instead became involved in trade unionism, joining the very minority federation of teachers, a member of the Confédération générale du travail unitaire, in 1932. She took part in all the federation's congresses, and contributed to its magazine, l'École émancipée[1]. At the time, she was close to the “federal majority”, opposed to the Communists, and in 1934 took over the direction of the magazine L'Avant garde syndicale, founded from the FUE leadership by CGTU minorities.

A member of the national bureau of the Comité de vigilance des intellectuels antifascistes, in 1935 she helped Marceau Pivert found the Gauche révolutionnaire, a “left-wing” current within the French Section of the Workers' International.

The year 1936 marked a turning point in her life and commitment. She was appointed to the Lycée Molière in Paris (her sister Jacqueline Audry, a future film director, had studied there), while the FUE disappeared as part of the union reunification between the General Confederation of Labour (France) and CGTU.

During the World War II, she was close to Resistance circles, and in particular, after her transfer to Grenoble in 1941, where she joined Minder with their son Jean-François, to the communists of the Front National through Sofia Jancu, Gabriel Péri's companion. Colette Audry joined the French Resistance in 1942.

Having returned to Paris in 1944, from 1945 to 1946 she was a chargé de mission at the Ministry of Information. She then returned to teaching, except from 1952 to 1957, when she was seconded to the CNRS to write a thesis on the double in literature, under the direction of Gaston Bachelard.

However, she turned away from militant action to devote herself to artistic and literary activities. She helped write René Clément's La Bataille du rail, contributed to Sartre's Les Temps modernes until 1955, wrote the screenplays for some of her sister Jacqueline's films (The Misfortunes of Sophie (1946) and Fruits amers (1967)) and published literary works.

The first, a collection of short stories, On joue perdant, was published in 1946 by Gallimard. She wrote a play, Soledad, which was one of the successes of the 1956 theatre year, and won the Prix Médicis in 1962 for her novel Derrière la baignoire.

In the meantime, she suggested to the young Françoise Sagan, who submitted her manuscript of Bonjour Tristesse in 1953, that she revise the ending, and recommended three publishers to her.

From 1964, she directed the “Femme” collection at Editions Denoël, the first in France to offer French and foreign works, all written by women, at the rate of one title per month. She published La femme mystifiée by Betty Friedan, Aucun de nous ne reviendra by Charlotte Delbo, La Vie des femmes by Évelyne Sullerot, Ma vie by Eleanor Roosevelt and Les Femmes japonaises by Élisabeth Dufourcq.

But in the mid-1950s, she returned to activism, joining the “New Left”, led by Gilles Martinet, Claude Bourdet and Louis Vallon, which later dissolved into the Union of the Socialist Left, before taking part in the creation of the Unified Socialist Party (France) in 1960.

After the creation of the new Socialist Party (France), she became editor-in-chief of Synthèse Flash, the newsletter of the Poperenist current. She represented this current on the PS steering committee from the Épinay congress until 1983.

In the 1970s, she devoted herself to training militants, writing several brochures for the Socialist Party, and to the Institut socialiste d'études et de recherches (ISER) founded in 1974, of which she was director and then, after 1986, president. She influenced Jean-Luc Mélenchon on feminist issues during this period. Colette Audry's position within the institute was such that ISER was dissolved in 1990, shortly after her death.

During the last two years of her life, she corresponded with a Benedictine monk. Among other things, they exchanged ideas on literature. These letters from Colette Audry were published three years after her death under the title Rien au-delà, which are the last words of the last letter she wrote to her correspondent before being hospitalized.

In 2013, her name was given to the main courtyard of the Parti Socialiste headquarters on Rue de Solférino in Paris.

== Selected filmography ==
- The Misfortunes of Sophie (1946)
