= In Old Alsace (1933 film) =

1933 film

- Directed by: Jacques de Baroncelli
- Written by: Alexandre Chatrian (novel); Emile Erckmann (novel)
- Starring: Lucien Duboscq; Simone Bourday; Madeleine Guitty
- Cinematography: Louis Chaix; Marius Roger
- Music by: Roland Manuel
- Production company: Les Films Artistiques Français
- Distributed by: Les Films Minerva
- Release date: 10 November 1933
- Running time: 90 minutes
- Country: France
- Language: French

In Old Alsace (French title:L'ami Fritz) is a 1933 French drama film directed by Jacques de Baroncelli and starring Lucien Duboscq, Simone Bourday and Madeleine Guitty. The film's sets were designed by the art director Jean d'Eaubonne. It is based on an 1864 novel by Alexandre Chatrian and Emile Erckmann.

== Synopsis ==
In a small Alsace town Fritz Kobus is a bachelor who refuses to contemplate marriage and makes a bet that he won't. However he falls in love with Suzel, daughter of a local farmer.

== Cast ==
- Lucien Duboscq as Fritz Kobus
- Simone Bourday as Suzel
- Madeleine Guitty as Catherine
- Jacques de Féraudy as Frédéric
- Charles Lamy as David Sichel, le rabbin
- Jean Coquelin as Un célibataire
- Carjol as Le percepteur
- Lisa Aubertin

== Bibliography ==
- Goble, Alan. The Complete Index to Literary Sources in Film. Walter de Gruyter, 1999.
