= Last Adventure (film) =

1942 film

- Directed by: Robert Péguy
- Written by: Léopold Marchand
- Based on: Papa by Gaston Arman de Caillavet and Robert de Flers
- Produced by: Fernand Rivers
- Starring: Annie Ducaux; Jean-Max; André Alerme
- Cinematography: Fédote Bourgasoff
- Edited by: Henriette Pinson
- Music by: Henri Verdun
- Production company: Les Films Fernand Rivers
- Distributed by: Éclair-Journal
- Release date: 26 March 1942
- Running time: 104 minutes
- Country: France
- Language: French

Last Adventure (French: Dernière aventure) is a 1942 French comedy film directed by Robert Péguy and starring Annie Ducaux, Jean-Max and André Alerme. The film's sets were designed by the art director René Renoux.

== Cast ==
- Annie Ducaux as Georgina Courzan
- Jean-Max as Le comte de Larzac
- André Alerme as Charmeuil
- Léon Belières as L'abbé Jocasse
- Blanchette Brunoy as Jeanne Aubrin
- Pierre Dux as Jean Bernard
- Germaine Laugier as Colette
- Louis Blanche
- Madeleine Brosy
- Aline Carola
- Jean Coquelin
- Henri de Livry
- Paul Entéric
- Gustave Gallet
- Paul Lluís
- Dorothée Luss
- Yvonne Scheffer
- Robert Servais

== Bibliography ==
- Bessy, Maurice & Chirat, Raymond. Histoire du cinéma français: encyclopédie des films, 1940–1950. Pygmalion, 1986
- Goble, Alan. The Complete Index to Literary Sources in Film. Walter de Gruyter, 1999.
- Rège, Philippe. Encyclopedia of French Film Directors, Volume 1. Scarecrow Press, 2009.
