= The Battle of the Rails =

1946 film directed by René Clément

- French: La Bataille du rail
- Directed by: René Clément
- Written by: René Clément; Colette Audry
- Produced by: Pierre Lévy-Corti
- Narrated by: Charles Boyer
- Cinematography: Henri Alekan
- Edited by: Jacques Desagneaux
- Music by: Yves Baudrier
- Production company: Coopérative Générale du Cinéma Français
- Distributed by: Union Française de Production Cinématographique
- Release date: 27 February 1946
- Running time: 85 minutes
- Country: France
- Language: French

The Battle of the Rails (French: La Bataille du rail (Note: The film's opening titles read "Bataille du rail", without the definite article.)) is a 1946 French docudrama war film co-written directed by René Clément in his feature directorial debut, and narrated by Charles Boyer. It depicts the efforts by railway workers in the French Resistance to sabotage German military transport trains during the Second World War, particularly during the Invasion of Normandy by Allies. Many of the cast were genuine railway workers. While critics have often historically treated it as similar to Italian neorealism, it is closer to the traditional documentaries on which the director had worked.

The film was shown at the inaugural Cannes Film Festival, where it won the Jury Prize and Clément won the Best Director Award. The film also won the inaugural Prix Méliès.

== Synopsis ==
This film chronicles the resistance of French railway workers during World War II and their efforts—such as sabotaging trains and tracks—to disrupt rail traffic during the Nazi occupation. It glorifies the heroic image of the railway worker-turned-resistance fighter and recounts the acts of sabotage and other clandestine operations carried out by employees of the newly formed SNCF during the German occupation.

During the German occupation, in the provinces, a stationmaster nicknamed "Camargue" and his deputy, Athos, lead the resistance in their sector. They organise crossings of the demarcation line between Occupied France and Vichy France and carry out numerous acts of sabotage. To counter the resistance, the Nazis execute hostages.

== Cast ==
- Charles Boyer as the voice of the narrator
- Jean Clarieux as Lampin
- Jean Daurand as Jean, railway worker
- Howard Vernon as German supervisor
- Lucien Desagneaux as Roussel/"Athos"
- François Joux as François, resistance member
- Pierre Latour as German officer
- Tony Laurent as Tony/"Carmargue"
- Robert Leray as Robert, resistance member
- André Miller as Deutsche Reichsbahn official
- Léon Pauléon as Saint-André stationmaster
- Marcel Barnault as Marcel, resistance member
- Pierre Lozach as Louis, railway worker
- Pierre Mindaist as Pierre, railway worker
- Fernand Rauzena, chief engineer
- Michel Salina as Michel, director
- Frédéric Mariotti as Jules, mechanic

== Production ==
René Clément had directed the short film Ceux du Rail (Railway Workers) in 1943.

As early as late 1944, he began scouting locations along the Guingamp-Lannion railway line. Filming took place between early April and September 1945 in the communes of Plouaret, Trégrom, Lannion, and Guingamp, as well as at the Saint-Brieuc railway station. Many scenes were also shot in Château-du-Loir (Sarthe) and Dissay-sous-Courcillon (Saint-André station).

In the film's opening scene, a voice on the platform announces Chalon-sur-Saône station; in fact, the scene was filmed at Saint-Brieuc station.

The scene depicting the derailment of a German military train, travelling at close range ("tight on the signals") behind the Apfelkern armoured train, was filmed just outside Trégrom station in the Côtes-du-Nord department, heading toward Rennes, on an embankment spanning the Léguer River (48°36'18N - 3°24'56W). For this sequence, the train was run against the normal flow of traffic. The scene was filmed without special effects; a real train was sent plunging into the valley.

The ammunition used for the battle scenes consisted of live rounds, as real ammunition was easier to source than blanks. During filming, the wagon carrying the truck used as the film's sound studio broke away from the production convoy and drifted down a sloping track; it passed through seven unguarded level crossings towards Lannion and, despite unsuccessful attempts by railway workers to slow it down on sidings at Lannion station, ended its run by smashing through a buffer stop and the station wall, crashing into Lannion's market square at nearly 70 km/h, miraculously without causing any injuries.

The locomotives visible in the film include, among others, the steam locomotives 5-140 G 436, 231 H 566, 140 D 234, 030 A 629, 030 A 755, and 141 C 133, as well as the electric locomotive 4-BB 173. Rail-mounted steam cranes with maximum lifting capacities of 32 and 50 tonnes can also be seen.

== Release ==
In 1949, the film was distributed in America by Arthur Mayer and Joseph Burstyn.

The film was withdrawn from circulation in French Indochina, when it became known that Viet Minh members were using the film as training material for sabotaging railways.

=== Home media ===
The film was released on Blu-ray in France on 1 June 2010.

== Adaptation ==
Three years after the film's release, its two co-screenwriters, René Clément and Colette Audry, published a novelisation of their screenplay, published by Comptoir français de diffusion in 1949, J'ai lu in 1967, and Éditions de Crémille in 1972.

== Reception ==
=== Critical response ===
Reviewing the film on its 1949 US release, Bosley Crowther of The New York Times wrote "For here, in this ninety-minute picture, is a sizzling dramatic account of realistic action and adventure in the fascinating realm of railway trains—of smuggling, spying, train-wrecking and correlated fighting by the bold Maquis."

André Bazin spoke positively of the film, in contrast to his Cahiers du Cinéma colleagues' more critical read of René Clément. He wrote writing "The morality of art fuses here with the morality of history. The greatness of this film and its spiritual bond with the cause of the Resistance are not unrelated to the purity of intention revealed by its means and its men."

=== Awards and nominations ===
Institution	Year	Category	Nominee	Result	Ref.
Cannes Film Festival	1946	Palme d'Or	René Clément	Nominated	
Cannes Film Festival	1946	Jury Prize	René Clément	Won	
Cannes Film Festival	1946	Best Director	René Clément	Won	
French Syndicate of Cinema Critics	1947	Prix Méliès	René Clément	Won	

== See also ==
- Battle for the railways

== Bibliography ==
- Williams, Alan. Republic of Images: A History of French Filmmaking. Harvard University Press, 1992.
