= Pierre Asso =

French actor (1904–1974)

- Born: 4 March 1904; Nice, Alpes-Maritimes, France
- Died: 10 December 1974 (aged 70); Paris, France
- Occupation: Actor
- Years active: 1936-1975 (film)

Pierre Asso (1904–1974) was a French stage, film and television actor.

== Selected filmography ==
- Topaze (1936) - Tamise
- La neige sur les pas (1942)
- Les petits riens (1942)
- Box of Dreams (1945) - Le fou (uncredited)
- Patrie (1946) - Pablo
- The Big Meeting (1950) - Père Saint-Michel
- Thirst of Men (1950) - Le Toulonnais
- Quay of Grenelle (1950)- Le vieux du village
- On Trial (1954) - Le maître-chanteur
- Le Combat dans l'île (1962) - Serge
- Lucky Jo (1964)
- Cannabis (1970)
- The Boat on the Grass (1971) - Alexis
- Two Men in Town (1973) - Le directeur de la prison #2 (uncredited)
- Creezy (1974)
- The Flesh of the Orchid (1975) - Le docteur (final film role)

== Bibliography ==
- Ann C. Paietta. Teachers in the Movies: A Filmography of Depictions of Grade School, Preschool and Day Care Educators, 1890s to the Present. McFarland, 2007.
