= Jules Moy =

French stage and film actor (1862-1938)

- Born: 14 September 1862; Paris, France
- Died: 25 April 1938 (aged 75); Clichy-la-Garenne, Hauts-de-Seine, France
- Other name: Jules Moys
- Occupation: Actor
- Years active: 1900-1936 (film )

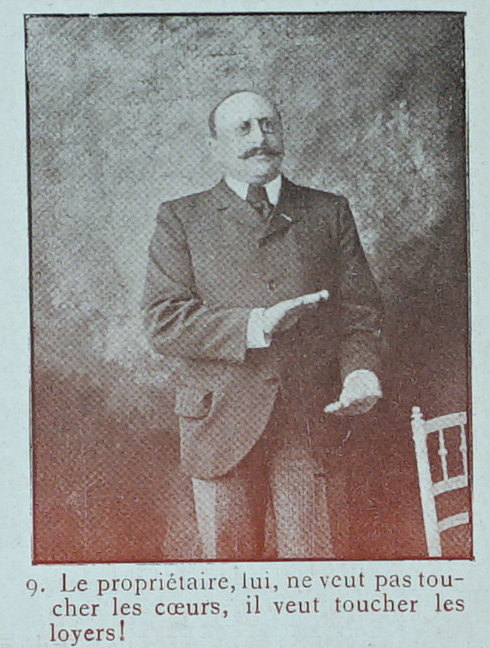
Jules Moy

Jules Moy (1862–1938) was a French stage and film actor.

== Selected filmography ==
- The Vein (1928)
- Cagliostro (1929)
- Mistigri (1931)
- The Man at Midnight (1931)
- Let's Touch Wood (1933)
- Bach the Detective (1936)
- The Marriages of Mademoiselle Levy (1936)

== Bibliography ==
- Robert Tanitch. Oscar Wilde on Stage and Screen. Methuen, 1999.
