= The Forsaken (1937 film) =

1937 film

- Directed by: Jacques Séverac
- Written by: Jacques Séverac
- Based on: Les réprouvés by André Armandy
- Produced by: Adolphe Osso
- Starring: Jean Servais; Janine Crispin; Pierre Mingand
- Cinematography: André Bac; Ernest Bourreaud; Christian Matras; Amédée Morrin
- Music by: Maurice Naggiar
- Production company: Hades Films
- Distributed by: Union Française de Production Cinématographique
- Release date: 19 February 1937
- Running time: 90 minutes
- Country: France
- Language: French

The Forsaken (French: Les réprouvés) is a 1937 French war drama film directed by Jacques Séverac and starring Jean Servais, Janine Crispin and Pierre Mingand. It was based on a novel of the same title by André Armandy. It was shot at the Victorine Studios in Nice. The film's sets were designed by the art director Jean Lafitte.

== Synopsis ==
A group of Foreign Legion soldiers serving in French North Africa on the edge of the Sahara Desert are attacked by an overwhelming enemy force.

== Cast ==
- Jean Servais as Prieur
- Janine Crispin as Gloriette
- Pierre Mingand as Le lieutenant d'Armançon
- Alexandre Rignault as Faggianelli
- Princesse Kandou as La princesse Fatima el Tlemci
- Yvonne Claudie as La girl
- Raymond Cordy as Badar
- Cosaert as Morin
- Pierre Magnier as Le commandant
- Gina Manès as La chanteuse réaliste
- Gaston Modot as Le patron
- Nino Pavese as Le sergent
- Poussard as Girval
- Georges Térof as Un colon
- François Viguier as Le Syrien

== Bibliography ==
- Bessy, Maurice & Chirat, Raymond. Histoire du cinéma français: 1935-1939. Pygmalion, 1986.
- Crisp, Colin. Genre, Myth and Convention in the French Cinema, 1929-1939. Indiana University Press, 2002.
- Goble, Alan. The Complete Index to Literary Sources in Film. Walter de Gruyter, 1999.
- Rège, Philippe. Encyclopedia of French Film Directors, Volume 1. Scarecrow Press, 2009.
