= Lucien Arnaud =

French actor and coach (1897–1975)

- Born: 26 August 1897; Toulon, France
- Died: 11 December 1975 (aged 78); Créteil, France
- Occupations: actor, acting coach

Lucien Arnaud (26 August 1897 - 11 December 1975) was a French stage and film actor and acting coach.

== Career ==
During the 1920s, Arnaud was part of the troupe de l'Atelier at the Théâtre-Montmartre in Paris (now Théâtre de l'Atelier), where he worked with Charles Dullin. Besides his work as a performer, Arnaud had a long career as an acting coach. Numerous French performers attended his classes, including Jean-Louis Barrault, Jean Vilar, Alain Cuny and Jean Marais. Arnaud later worked with Vilar at the Théâtre National Populaire where he also kept teaching acting. He played a role in starting Gérard Depardieu's career: Depardieu, who had accompanied a friend to Arnaud's class, was noticed by Arnaud who invited him to perform on stage.

== Filmography ==
=== Film ===
- 1921 : La Vivante épingle by Jacques Robert
- 1922 : Le Fils du flibustier by Louis Feuillade : Corentin
- 1928 : Misdeal by Jean Grémillon : the traveler
- 1932 : The Chocolate Girl by Marc Allégret : Pinglet
- 1935 : Paris, mes amours by Alphonse-Lucien Blondeau
- 1946 : Antoine et Antoinette by Jacques Becker
- 1948 : Le cavalier de Croix-Mort by Lucien Ganier-Raymond
- 1950 : Three Telegrams by Henri Decoin
- 1952 : Monsieur Taxi by André Hunebelle
- 1952 : Le Dialogue des carmélites by Raymond-Léopold Bruckberger and Philippe Agostini

=== Television ===
- 1961 : Loin de Rueil by Claude Barma : Théodore L'Aumône
- 1962 : L'Avare by Robert Valey : Théodore L'Aumône

== Theatre ==
- 1922 : The Pleasure of Honesty by Luigi Pirandello, mise en scène Charles Dullin, Théâtre Montmartre
- 1923 : Celui qui vivait sa mort by Marcel Achard, mise en scène Charles Dullin, Théâtre de l'Atelier
- 1923 : Voulez-vous jouer avec moâ ? by Marcel Achard, mise en scène Charles Dullin, Théâtre de l'Atelier
- 1924 : The Imbecile by Luigi Pirandello, adaptation Benjamin Crémieux, mise en scène Charles Dullin, Théâtre de l'Atelier
- 1924 : Each In His Own Way by Luigi Pirandello, adaptation Benjamin Crémieux, mise en scène Charles Dullin, Théâtre de l'Atelier
- 1925] : Epicœne, or The silent woman by Ben Jonson, adaptation Marcel Achard, mise en scène Charles Dullin, Théâtre de l'Atelier
- 1926 : Je ne vous aime pas by Marcel Achard, mise en scène Charles Dullin, Théâtre de l'Atelier
- 1926 : La Comédie du bonheur by Nikolai Evreinov, mise en scène Charles Dullin, Théâtre de l'Atelier
- 1927 : Le Joueur d'échecs by Henry Dupuy-Mazuel, adaptation Marcel Achard, mise en scène Charles Dullin, Théâtre de l'Atelier
- 1930 : Musse ou l'École de l'hypocrisie by Jules Romains, mise en scène Charles Dullin, Théâtre de l'Atelier
- 1931 : La Quadrature du cercle by Valentin Petrovitch Kataev, adaptation Edmond Huntzbüchler, mise en scène François Vibert, Théâtre de l'Atelier
- 1937 : Atlas Hôtel by Armand Salacrou, mise en scène Charles Dullin, Théâtre de l'Atelier
- 1937 : Julius Caesar by William Shakespeare, adaptation Simone Jollivet, mise en scène Charles Dullin, Théâtre de l'Atelier
- 1943 : The Flies by Jean-Paul Sartre, mise en scène Charles Dullin, Théâtre de la Cité
- 1945 : Le Soldat et la Sorcière by Armand Salacrou, mise en scène Charles Dullin, Théâtre de la Cité
- 1947 : La terre est ronde by Armand Salacrou, mise en scène Charles Dullin, Théâtre de l'Atelier
- 1947 : L'An mil by Jules Romains, mise en scène Charles Dullin, Théâtre de la Cité
- 1951 : The Prince of Homburg by Heinrich von Kleist, mise en scène Jean Vilar, Cour d'Honneur du Palais des Papes d'Avignon
- 1951 : La Calandria by Bernardo Dovizi da Bibbiena, mise en scène René Dupuy, Cour d'Honneur du Palais des Papes d'Avignon
- 1951 : Mothe Courage by Bertolt Brecht, mise en scène Jean Vilar, Théâtre de la Cité Jardins de Suresnes
- 1952 : Waltz of the Toreadors by Jean Anouilh, mise en scène by the author and Roland Piétri, Comédie des Champs-Élysées
- 1952 : Nucléa by Henri Pichette, mise en scène Gérard Philipe and Jean Vilar, Théâtre national populaire
- 1952 : Lorenzaccio by Alfred de Musset, mise en scène Gérard Philipe, Cour d'Honneur du Palais des Papes d'Avignon
- 1953 : Danton's Death by Georg Büchner, mise en scène Jean Vilar, Cour d'Honneur du Palais des Papes d'Avignon
- 1954 : Ruy Blas by Victor Hugo, mise en scène Jean Vilar, Théâtre national populaire
- 1954 : Macbeth by William Shakespeare, mise en scène Jean Vilar, Cour d'Honneur du Palais des Papes d'Avignon
- 1955 : La Ville by Paul Claudel, mise en scène Jean Vilar, Théâtre national populaire
- 1955 : Marie Tudor by Victor Hugo, mise en scène Jean Vilar, Cour d'Honneur du Palais des Papes d'Avignon
- 1956 : Macbeth by William Shakespeare, mise en scène Jean Vilar, Cour d'Honneur du Palais des Papes d'Avignon
- 1956 : The Miser by Molière, mise en scène Jean Vilar, Théâtre national populaire
- 1956 : Platonov by Anton Chekov, mise en scène Jean Vilar, Théâtre national populaire
- 1956 : The Marriage of Figaro by Beaumarchais, mise en scène Jean Vilar, Cour d'Honneur du Palais des Papes d'Avignon
- 1957 : Le Faiseur by Honoré de Balzac, mise en scène Jean Vilar, Palais de Chaillot
- 1957 : Henri IV by Luigi Pirandello, mise en scène Jean Vilar, Cour d'Honneur du Palais des Papes d'Avignon
- 1958 : Ubu Roi by Alfred Jarry, mise en scène Jean Vilar, Palais de Chaillot
- 1958 : The School for Wives by Molière, mise en scène Georges Wilson, Théâtre Montansier
- 1958 : Le Carrosse du Saint-Sacrement by Prosper Mérimée, mise en scène Jean Vilar, Grand Théâtre de Bordeaux
- 1958 : The Moods of Marianne by Alfred de Musset, mise en scène Gérard Philipe, Cour d'Honneur du Palais des Papes d'Avignon
- 1959 : The Shoemaker's Holiday by Thomas Dekker, adaptation Michel Vinaver, mise en scène Georges Wilson, Palais de Chaillot
- 1959 : A Midsummer Night's Dream by William Shakespeare, mise en scène Jean Vilar, Cour d'Honneur du Palais des Papes d'Avignon
- 1959 : Les Précieuses ridicules by Molière, adaptation Michel Vinaver, mise en scène Yves Gasc, Palais de Chaillot
- 1960 : Erik XIV by August Strindberg, mise en scène Jean Vilar, Palais de Chaillot
- 1960 : Turcaret by Alain-René Lesage, mise en scène Jean Vilar, Grand Théâtre de Bordeaux
- 1960 : The Resistible Rise of Arturo Ui by Bertolt Brecht, mise en scène Jean Vilar, Théâtre national populaire
- 1961 : Loin de Rueil by Raymond Queneau, adaptation Maurice Jarre and Roger Pillaudin, mise en scène Maurice Jarre and Jean Vilar, Palais de Chaillot
- 1961 : The Mayor of Zalamea by Pedro Calderón de la Barca, mise en scène Georges Riquier and Jean Vilar, Cour d'Honneur du Palais des Papes d'Avignon
- 1961 : The Boors by Carlo Goldoni, mise en scène Roger Mollien and Jean Vilar, Cour d'Honneur du Palais des Papes d'Avignon
- 1961 : Peace by Aristophanes, adaptation and mise en scène Jean Vilar, Palais de Chaillot
- 1962 : The Trojan War Will Not Take Place by Jean Giraudoux, mise en scène Jean Vilar, Cour d'Honneur du Palais des Papes d'Avignon
- 1963 : Life of Galileo by Bertolt Brecht, mise en scène Jean Vilar, Théâtre national populaire
- 1963 : Bohemian Lights by Ramón María del Valle-Inclán, mise en scène Georges Wilson, Palais de Chaillot
- 1963 : Children of the Sun by Maxim Gorky, mise en scène Georges Wilson, Palais de Chaillot
- 1964 : Zoo ou l'Assassin philanthrope by Vercors, mise en scène Jean Deschamps, Théâtre national populaire
- 1964 : Romulus the Great by Friedrich Dürrenmatt, mise en scène Georges Wilson, Palais de Chaillot
- 1964 : Luther by John Osborne, mise en scène Georges Wilson, Cour d'Honneur du Palais des Papes d'Avignon
- 1964 : Mr Puntila and his Man Matti by Bertolt Brecht, mise en scène Georges Wilson, Palais de Chaillot
- 1965 : Hamlet by William Shakespeare, mise en scène Georges Wilson, Palais de Chaillot
- 1966 : Dieu, empereur et paysan by Gyula Háy, mise en scène Georges Wilson, Cour d'Honneur du Palais des Papes d'Avignon
