= Mistigri (film) =

1931 film

- Directed by: Harry Lachman
- Written by: Marcel Achard
- Produced by: Robert Kane
- Starring: Madeleine Renaud; Noël-Noël; Jean Debucourt
- Cinematography: Harry Stradling Sr.
- Music by: Francis Gromon
- Production company: Les Studios Paramount
- Distributed by: Les Films Paramount
- Release date: 1 December 1931
- Running time: 80 minutes
- Country: France
- Language: French

Mistigri is a 1931 French drama film adapted by Marcel Achard from his play of the same name. It was directed by Harry Lachman and stars Madeleine Renaud, Noël-Noël and Jean Debucourt. It was made at the Joinville Studios by the French subsidiary of Paramount Pictures.

== Cast ==
- Madeleine Renaud as Nell 'Mistigri' Marignan
- Noël-Noël as Zamore
- Jean Debucourt as Dr. Chalabre
- André Dubosc as Marignan
- Jules Moy as Cormeau
- Simone Héliard as Fanny
- Magdeleine Bérubet as Madame Perache
- Ritou Lancyle
- Monique Rolland
- Janine Borelli
- Marie-Jacqueline Chantal
- André Randall
- André Simon
- Pedro Elviro
- Raymond Aimos
- Gustave Huberdeau

== Bibliography ==
- Dayna Oscherwitz & MaryEllen Higgins. The A to Z of French Cinema. Scarecrow Press, 2009.
