= Marcel Barnault =

French actor (1901–1981)

- Born: 10 January 1901; Paris, France
- Died: 6 August 1981 (aged 80); Antibes, Alpes-Maritimes, France
- Occupation: Actor

Marcel Barnault (10 January 1901 – 6 August 1981) was a French actor, chiefly known for his starring role in The Battle of the Rails (1946).

== Filmography ==
- 1932: F.P.1
- 1933: The abbot Constantine
- 1946: The Battle of the Rails
- 1947: Rouletabille joue et gagne
- 1948: Rouletabille contre la dame de pique
