= The Man at Midnight =

1931 film

- Directed by: Harry Lachman
- Written by: Walter Ellis (play)); Jean Guitton
- Produced by: Manuel Chavez
- Starring: Jean Weber; Josseline Gaël; Marcel Simon
- Cinematography: Rudolph Maté; Jacques Montéran; Gérard Perrin
- Music by: René Mercier
- Production company: Films Albatros
- Distributed by: Les Films Armor
- Release date: 17 August 1931
- Running time: 95 minutes
- Country: France
- Language: French

The Man at Midnight (French: Le Monsieur de minuit) is a 1931 French comedy film directed by Harry Lachman and starring Jean Weber, Josseline Gaël and Marcel Simon. It was the French-language version of the British film Almost a Honeymoon.

The film "testifies to the growing role of actors in talking cinema" according to Jacques Choukroun.

== Cast ==
- Jean Weber as Raoul de Saint-Auban
- Josseline Gaël as Arlette
- Marcel Simon as Jean
- Jules Moy as Isaac Dupont
- Odette Talazac as Poupette
- Jean Gobet as Durand-Toucourt
- Jean Guilton as the driver
- Louis Vonelly as the man
- Manzoni as the singer
- Stephen Weber as the café-concert singer
- Léon Courtois as the usher

== Reception ==
Cinémagazine found it was "a charming comedy."

== Bibliography ==
- Cook, Samantha. Writers and production artists. St James Press, 1993.
