= Pierre Mingand =

- Born: 2 June 1900; Besançon, France
- Died: 19 August 1982 (aged 82); Agen, France
- Occupations: Actor, singer
- Years active: 1933–1953 (film)

Pierre Mingand (2 June 1900 – 19 August 1982) was a French singer and film actor. He was known for his impersonations of Maurice Chevalier at the Folies Bergère, something he reprised in Billy Wilder's 1934 film Mauvaise Graine.

== Selected filmography ==
- Court Waltzes (1933)
- Mauvaise Graine (1934)
- Mademoiselle Mozart (1935)
- The Secret of Woronzeff (1935)
- The Marriages of Mademoiselle Levy (1936)
- The Forsaken (1937)
- Return at Dawn (1938)
- Abused Confidence (1938)
- Mademoiselle Swing (1942)

== Bibliography ==
- Phillips, Alastair. City of Darkness, City of Light: Émigré Filmmakers in Paris, 1929–1939. Amsterdam University Press, 2004.
