= Alexandre Mihalesco =

Romanian actor (1883–1974)

- Born: Alexandru Mihăilescu; 19 October 1883; Bucharest, Romania
- Died: 28 December 1974 (aged 91); Paris, France
- Occupation: Actor
- Years active: 1912–1957 (film)

Alexandre Mihalesco (French: [alɛksɑ̃dʁ mi.alɛsko]; born Alexandru Mihăilescu, Romanian: [alekˈsandru mihə.iˈlesku]; 19 October 1883 – 28 December 1974) was a Romanian film actor who largely appeared in French productions.

== Selected filmography ==
- The Independence of Romania (1912)
- On the Waves of Happiness (1920)
- The Crystal Submarine (1927)
- The Passion of Joan of Arc (1928)
- Accused, Stand Up! (1930)
- Levy and Company (1930)
- Nights of Princes (1930)
- Little Lise (1930)
- The Sweetness of Loving (1930)
- Southern Cross (1932)
- The Levy Department Stores (1932)
- Buridan's Donkey (1932)
- Night of Temptation (1932)
- The Sandman (1932)
- The Missing Treaty (1933)
- Judex (1934)
- Sidonie Panache (1934)
- The Uncle from Peking (1934)
- Honeymoon (1935)
- Moses and Solomon, Perfumers (1935)
- The Call of Silence (1936)
- Bach the Detective (1936)
- Inspector Grey (1936)
- Mercadet (1936)
- The Phantom Gondola (1936)
- Woman of Malacca (1937)
- Francis the First (1937)
- The Secrets of the Red Sea (1937)
- Education of a Prince (1938)
- Tricoche and Cacolet (1938)
- That's Sport (1938)
- Clodoche (1938)
- Rasputin (1938)
- Storm Over Asia (1938)
- Golden Venus (1938)
- Captain Benoit (1938)
- My Aunt the Dictator (1939)
- Le Duel (1939)
- His Uncle from Normandy (1939)
- Vidocq (1939)
- The Five Cents of Lavarede (1939)
- Facing Destiny (1940)
- The Master Valet (1941)
- Macao (1942)
- Colonel Pontcarral (1942)
- The Exile's Song (1943)
- Night Warning (1946)
- Barry (1949)
- Farewell Mister Grock (1950)
- Just Me (1950)
- Shot at Dawn (1950)
- Darling Caroline (1951)
- The Road to Damascus (1952)
- Piédalu Works Miracles (1952)
- Rasputin (1954)

== Bibliography ==
- Goble, Alan. The Complete Index to Literary Sources in Film. Walter de Gruyter, 1999.
