= Father Serge =

1945 film

- Directed by: Lucien Ganier-Raymond
- Written by: Pierre Laroche
- Based on: Father Sergius by Leo Tolstoy
- Produced by: André Hugon
- Starring: Jacques Dumesnil; Mila Parély; Marcel Herrand
- Cinematography: Raymond Agnel
- Edited by: Monique Lacombe
- Music by: Jacques Ibert
- Production company: Productions André Hugon
- Distributed by: Cinéma de France
- Release date: 4 September 1945
- Running time: 105 minutes
- Country: France
- Language: French

Father Serge (French: Le père Serge) is a 1945 French historical drama film directed by Lucien Ganier-Raymond and starring Jacques Dumesnil, Mila Parély and Marcel Herrand. It is based on the short story Father Sergius by Leo Tolstoy. It was shot at the Saint-Maurice Studios and Studio François 1 in Paris. The film's sets were designed by the art director Robert-Jules Garnier.

== Synopsis ==
Prince Stéphane, a rising figure at the court of Nicholas I is shocked when he discovers the Tsar has had an affair with his fiancée. He renounces all world interests and retires to a monastery, become a wondering monk who is valued for his faith and his abilities as a healer. When he discovers that his former love is serious ill in St Petersburg he heads there at once.

== Cast ==
- Jacques Dumesnil as Le prince Stéphane
- Mila Parély as La baronne Vera Kourianev
- Ariane Borg as La comtesse Marie Korotkova
- Marcel Herrand as Le tsar Nicolas Pavlovitch Romanoff I
- Louis Salou as Le comte Fedor Ivanovitch Kedrov
- Arlette Marchal as La tsarine
- Madeleine Lambert as La comtesse Varvara Alexandrovna Kedrov
- Armand Bernard as Aphamazy

== Bibliography ==
- Goble, Alan. The Complete Index to Literary Sources in Film. Walter de Gruyter, 1999.
