= Buridan's Donkey (film) =

1932 film directed by Alexandre Ryder

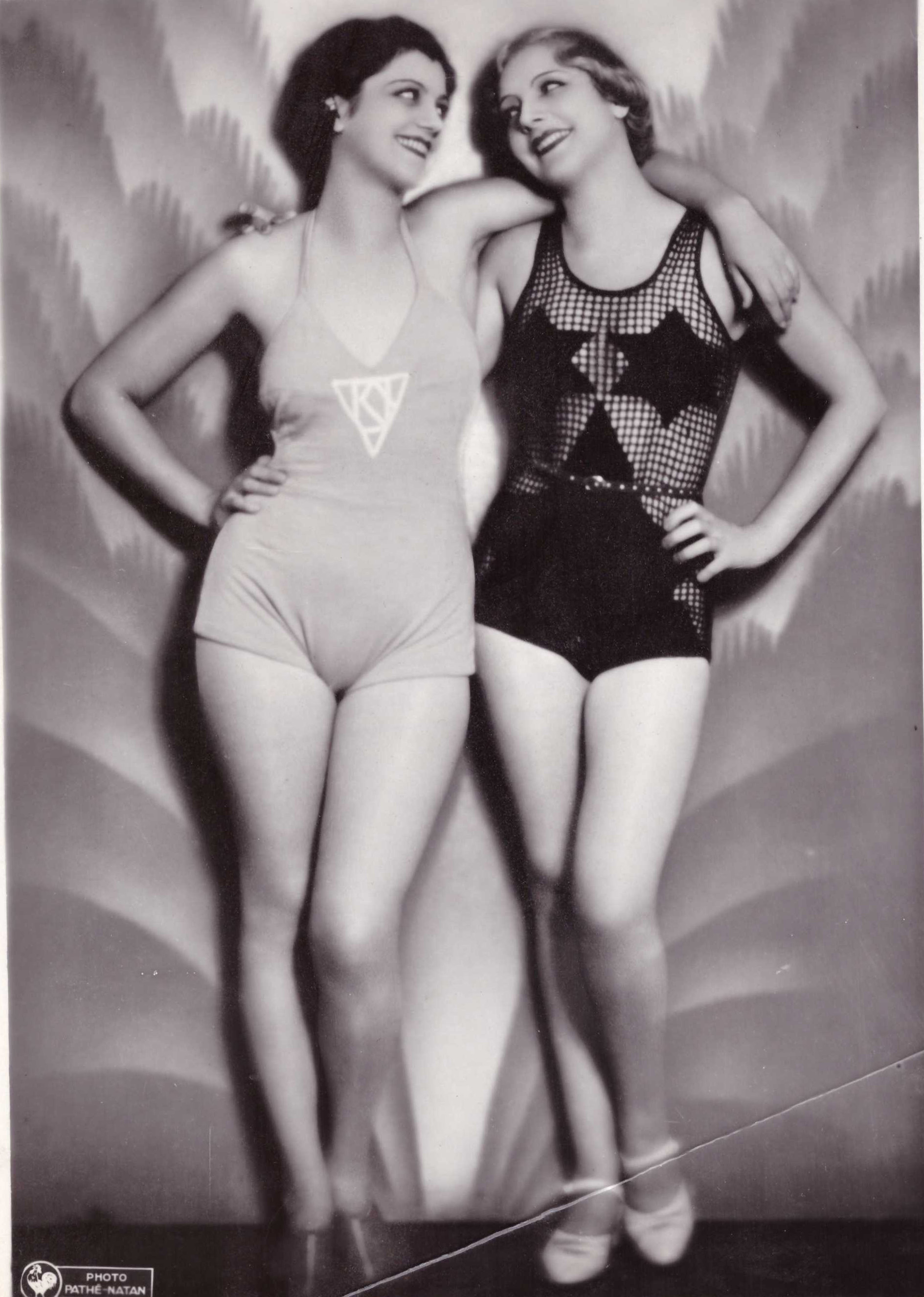
- Directed by: Alexandre Ryder
- Written by: Gaston Arman de Caillavet (play); Robert de Flers (play); André Birabeau; Alexandre Ryder
- Starring: René Lefèvre; Colette Darfeuil; Mona Goya
- Cinematography: Raymond Agnel; Henri Barreyre
- Music by: Jean Wiener
- Production company: Pathé-Natan
- Distributed by: Pathé-Natan
- Release date: 1932
- Running time: 77 minutes
- Country: France
- Language: French

Buridan's Donkey (French: L'âne de Buridan) is a 1932 French comedy film directed by Alexandre Ryder and starring René Lefèvre, Colette Darfeuil and Mona Goya. It takes its title from the fable of Buridan's donkey.

The film's art direction was by Guy de Gastyne.

== Cast ==
- René Lefèvre as Georges
- Colette Darfeuil as Vivette
- Mona Goya as Micheline
- Charles Prince as Adolphe
- Simone Deguyse as Fernande
- Mauricet as Lucien
- Francine Mussey as Odette
- Alexandre Mihalesco as Le photographe
- Jean Bara as Un petit garçon
- Jeanne Bernard
- Olga Lord
- Maximilienne

== Bibliography ==
- Crisp, Colin. Genre, Myth and Convention in the French Cinema, 1929-1939. Indiana University Press, 2002.
