= The Levy Department Stores =

1930 film

- Directed by: André Hugon
- Written by: André Hugon
- Produced by: André Hugon; Bernard Natan; Emile Natan
- Starring: Léon Belières; Charles Lamy; Alexandre Mihalesco
- Cinematography: Raymond Agnel; Henri Barreyre
- Edited by: Marguerite Beaugé
- Music by: Henri Verdun
- Production companies: Hugon-Films; Pathé-Natan
- Distributed by: Pathé Consortium Cinéma
- Release date: 29 January 1932
- Running time: 105 minutes
- Country: France
- Language: French

The Levy Department Stores (French: Les galeries Lévy et Cie) is a 1932 French comedy film directed by André Hugon and starring Léon Belières, Charles Lamy and Alexandre Mihalesco. It was the first of three sequels to the 1930 film Levy and Company.

The film's sets were designed by Christian-Jaque.

== Cast ==
- Léon Belières as Salomon Lévy
- Charles Lamy as Moïse Lévy
- Alexandre Mihalesco as Le vieux Lévy
- Simone Bourday as Rachel Meyer
- Christiane Dor as Paulette
- Doumel as César Patenolle
- Rodolphe Marcilly
- Micheline Masson
- Émile Saint-Ober as Le garçon
- Georges Zwingel

== See also ==
- Moritz Makes His Fortune (German version, 1931)

== Bibliography ==
- Rège, Philippe. Encyclopedia of French Film Directors, Volume 1. Scarecrow Press, 2009.
