= The Case of Doctor Brenner =

1933 film

- Directed by: John Daumery
- Written by: Imre Földes (play); Paul Vialar
- Starring: Jean Marchat; Simone Genevois; Maurice Rémy
- Production company: Warner Bros
- Distributed by: Warner Bros
- Release date: 14 March 1933
- Running time: 75 minutes
- Countries: France; United States
- Language: French

The Case of Doctor Brenner (French: Le cas du docteur Brenner) is a 1933 American-French drama film directed by John Daumery and starring Jean Marchat, Simone Genevois and Maurice Rémy. It is a French-language remake of the 1932 American film Alias the Doctor, itself based on a play by Imre Földes. It was produced by the French subsidiary of Warner Brothers.

== Cast ==
- Jean Marchat as Docteur Carl Brenner
- Simone Genevois as Lottie Brenner
- Maurice Rémy as Stéphane Brenner
- Jeanne Grumbach as Mère Brenner
- Michèle Béryl as Anna
- Héléna Manson as L'infirmière
- Louis Scott as Docteur Niergardt
- Henry Bonvallet
- Alexandre Dréan
- Bernhard Goetzke
- Roger Karl
- René Montis
- André Norevó

== Bibliography ==
- Bessy, Maurice & Chirat, Raymond. Histoire du cinéma français: 1929-1934. Pygmalion, 1988.
- Crisp, Colin. Genre, Myth and Convention in the French Cinema, 1929-1939. Indiana University Press, 2002.
- Goble, Alan. The Complete Index to Literary Sources in Film. Walter de Gruyter, 1999.
- Rège, Philippe. Encyclopedia of French Film Directors, Volume 1. Scarecrow Press, 2009.
