= Simone Héliard =

French actress

- Born: 1910 (age 115–116); France
- Occupation: Actress
- Years active: 1929–1940 (film)

Simone Héliard was a French stage and film actress.

== Selected filmography ==
- Mistigri (1931)
- Côte d'Azur (1932)
- The Champion Cook (1932)
- The Surprises of Divorce (1933)
- Topaze (1933)
- A Love Story (1933)
- Bach the Millionaire (1933)
- A Day Will Come (1934)
- The Blue Danube (1940)

== Bibliography ==
- White, Susan M. The Cinema of Max Ophuls: Magisterial Vision and the Figure of Woman. Columbia University Press, 1995.
