= The Surprises of Divorce =

1933 film

- Directed by: Jean Kemm
- Written by: Jean-Louis Bouquet
- Based on: The Surprises of Divorce by Alexandre Bisson and Antony Mars
- Produced by: Alex Nalpas
- Starring: Léon Belières; Nadine Picard; Charles Lamy
- Music by: Géo Sundy
- Production company: Les Films Alex Nalpas
- Distributed by: Pathé Consortium Cinéma
- Release date: 10 March 1933
- Running time: 87 minutes
- Country: France
- Language: French

The Surprises of Divorce (French: Les Surprises du divorce) is a 1933 French comedy film directed by Jean Kemm and starring Léon Belières, Nadine Picard and Charles Lamy. It was based on the 1888 play of the same title by Alexandre Bisson and Antony Mars, which had previously been adapted into a 1912 silent film. The film's sets were designed by the art director Robert Gys.

== Synopsis ==
A husband, annoyed by his mother-in-law, divorces his first wife. He remarries but on returning from his honeymoon he discovers that his new father-in-law has married his own ex-wife.

== Cast ==
- Léon Belières as Monsuier Bourganeuf
- Mauricet as Henri Duval
- Nadine Picard as Diane
- Charles Lamy as Corbulon
- Maximilienne as Mme. Bonicard
- Louis Blanche as Champeaux
- Simone Héliard as Gabrielle Bourganeuf

== Bibliography ==
- Bessy, Maurice & Chirat, Raymond. Histoire du cinéma français: 1929-1934. Pygmalion, 1988.
- Crisp, Colin. Genre, Myth and Convention in the French Cinema, 1929-1939. Indiana University Press, 2002.
- Rège, Philippe. Encyclopedia of French Film Directors, Volume 1. Scarecrow Press, 2009.
