= Jaspar =

Jaspar is a surname. Notable people with the surname include:

- Bobby Jaspar (1926–1963), cool-jazz and hard-bop saxophonist, flautist and composer born in Liège, Belgium
- Henri Jaspar (1870–1939), Belgian Catholic Party politician and prime-minister
- Jules Jaspar (1878–1963), Belgian Consul
- Marcel-Henri Jaspar (1901–1982), Belgian diplomat
- Jaspar von Oertzen (1912–2008), German stage, film and television actor
- Jaspar Yu Woon Chai (born 1988), Bruneian badminton player

== See also ==
- JASPAR, a database of transcription factor (TF) binding profiles
- Spelling variant of Caspar, one of the Three Biblical Magi
- Jasper
- Jaspur
- Jesper
