= Suzanne Christy =

Belgian actress

- Born: Lucie Hélène Elisabeth De Waersegger; 23 July 1904; Uccle, Belgium
- Died: 24 June 1974 (aged 69); Berchem-Sainte-Agathe, Belgium
- Occupation: Actress
- Years active: 1924-1939 (film )

Suzanne Christy (1904–1974) was a Belgian film actress.

== Selected filmography ==
- Le p'tit Parigot (1926)
- The Marriage of Mademoiselle Beulemans (1927)
- The Divine Voyage (1929)
- The Sandman (1932)
- A Telephone Call (1932)
- Southern Cross (1932)
- A Happy Man (1932)
- The Invisible Woman (1933)

== Bibliography ==
- Goble, Alan. The Complete Index to Literary Sources in Film. Walter de Gruyter, 1999.
