= The Invisible Woman (1933 film) =

1933 film

- Directed by: Georges Lacombe
- Written by: Jean Guitton
- Produced by: Alexandre Kamenka
- Starring: Jean Weber; Suzanne Christy; Mady Berry
- Cinematography: Louis Chaix; Marius Roger
- Edited by: Jacques Desagneaux
- Music by: Adolphe Borchard
- Production company: Films Albatros
- Distributed by: Gaumont-Franco Film-Aubert
- Release date: 2 June 1933
- Running time: 90 minutes
- Country: France
- Language: French

The Invisible Woman (French: La femme invisible) is a 1933 French comedy film directed by Georges Lacombe and starring Jean Weber, Suzanne Christy and Mady Berry. The film's sets were designed by the art director Lazare Meerson.

== Synopsis ==
When her parents attempt to force her to marry somebody other than the man she really loves, a young woman magically vanishes during a conjuring act.

== Cast ==
- Jean Weber
- Suzanne Christy
- Gaston Dupray
- Mady Berry
- Nadine Picard
- Louis Baron fils
- Jean Sinoël
- Georges Bever
- Jean Brochard
- Marcelle Barry
- René Marjolle
- Clary Monthal
- Émile Saint-Ober
- Marcel Simon

== Bibliography ==
- Crisp, Colin. Genre, Myth and Convention in the French Cinema, 1929-1939. Indiana University Press, 2002.
- Rège, Philippe. Encyclopedia of French Film Directors, Volume 1. Scarecrow Press, 2009.
