= Raymond Agnel =

French cinematographer

- Born: 26 July 1893; Marseille, Bouches-du-Rhône, France
- Died: 24 November 1967 (aged 74); Voulx, Seine-et-Marne, France
- Occupation: Cinematographer
- Years active: 1908–1954 (film)

Raymond Agnel (1893–1967) was a French cinematographer. Agnel began working during the silent era and was active until the 1950s, collaborating with directors such as Jean Renoir and Maurice Tourneur.

== Selected filmography ==
- Sarati the Terrible (1923)
- The Gardens of Murcia (1923)
- The Clairvoyant (1924)
- Terror (1924)
- Madame Sans-Gêne (1925)
- The Nude Woman (1926)
- Palaces (1927)
- Marquitta (1927)
- Madonna of the Sleeping Cars (1928)
- The Wedding March (1929)
- The Three Masks (1929)
- Levy and Company (1930)
- Tenderness (1930)
- The Levy Department Stores (1932)
- The Wonderful Day (1932)
- Buridan's Donkey (1932)
- The Sandman (1932)
- Southern Cross (1932)
- Fun in the Barracks (1932)
- Toto (1933)
- Arlette and Her Fathers (1934)
- Ernest the Rebel (1938)
- Four in the Morning (1938)
- The West (1938)
- Troubled Heart (1938)
- The Porter from Maxim's (1939)
- Love Around the Clock (1943)
- The Exile's Song (1943)
- Father Serge (1945)
- The Grand Hotel Affair (1946)
- Solita de Cordoue (1946)
- The Husbands of Leontine (1947)
- Monsieur de Falindor (1947)
- The Village of Wrath (1947)
- Monsieur Chasse (1947)
- Cab Number 13 (1948)
- Good Enough to Eat (1951)
- Darling Anatole (1954)

== Bibliography ==
- Fujiwara, Chris. Jacques Tourneur: The Cinema of Nightfall. McFarland, 1998.
- Taranow, Gerda. Sarah Bernhardt: The Art Within the Legend. Princeton University Press, 2015.
- Waldman, Harry. Maurice Tourneur: The Life and Films. McFarland, 2001.
