= Robert-Jules Garnier =

French art director (1883–1958)

- Born: 23 April 1883; Sèvres, Hauts-de-Seine, France
- Died: 15 April 1958 (aged 74); Condeau, Orne, France
- Occupation: Art director
- Years active: 1910-1950 (film)

Robert-Jules Garnier (1883–1958) was a French art director.

== Selected filmography ==
- Judex (1916)
- Marquitta (1927)
- The Crew (1928)
- Little Devil May Care (1928)
- Billeting Order (1932)
- The Mad Night (1932)
- If You Wish It (1932)
- A Dog That Pays Off (1932)
- Broken Wings (1933)
- The Illustrious Maurin (1933)
- The Fakir of the Grand Hotel (1934)
- Chourinette (1934)
- The Marriages of Mademoiselle Levy (1936)
- Maria of the Night (1936)
- The Two Schemers (1938)
- Fire in the Straw (1939)
- The Emigrant (1940)
- The Man Who Played with Fire (1942)
- Father Serge (1945)
- The Great Pack (1945)
- Impeccable Henri (1948)
- The Idol (1948)
- Doctor Laennec (1949)
- The Widow and the Innocent (1949)

== Bibliography ==
- Bergfelder, Tim & Harris, Sue & Street, Sarah. Film Architecture and the Transnational Imagination: Set Design in 1930s European Cinema. Amsterdam University Press, 2007.
