= The Abbot Constantine (novel) =

1882 novel by Ludovic Halévy

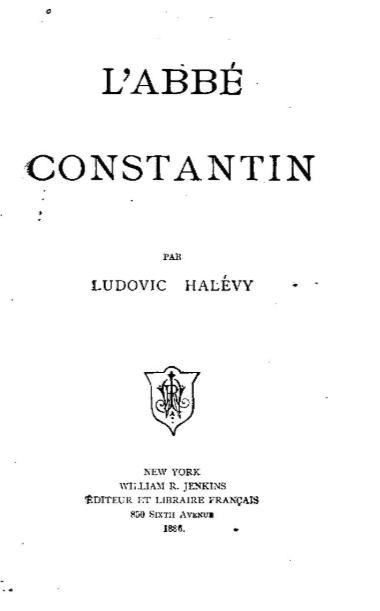
- Title page for L'abbé Constantin (1886)
- Author: Ludovic Halévy
- Language: French
- Publication date: 1882
- Publication place: France
- Media type: Print

The Abbot Constantine (French: L'abbé Constantin) is an 1882 novel by the French writer Ludovic Halévy. In 1887 it was turned into a play by Pierre Decourcelle and Hector Crémieux.

== Plot ==
An old priest, Abbot Constantine, has been serving for 30 years as a spiritual father and protector of the peasants, when he is suddenly informed that the heir of a deceased good friend of his, the Marquise de Longueval, turns out to be Ms. Scott, a former American actress and, of course, a "heretic" (a Protestant), who, by a special whim, bought the Castle of Longueval from the heirs of the marquise and along with it almost the entire village. The worst part was that the heretic actor, who had already received the admiration of a young man, decided to settle in the Longueval Castle and "poison" in the most insidious way, the honest and pure customs of that local community of peasants. Abbot Constantine, quite desperate, expects the fatal catastrophe. But, despite all his fears, fatal Ms. Scott ultimately conquers him, and even more easily, since it is later proven that not only she is graceful, merciful and generous; she is also revealed to be Catholic, originating from Catholic parents of Canada, and not heretical as everyone thought.

== Film adaptations ==
It has been turned into films on three occasions:

- Bettina Loved a Soldier, a 1916 American silent film
- The Abbot Constantine, a 1925 French silent film
- The Abbot Constantine, a 1933 French silent film

== Bibliography ==
- Goble, Alan (1999). The Complete Index to Literary Sources in Film. Walter de Gruyter
