= Maurice Rémy =

French actor (1899–1973)

- Born: 3 December 1899; Paris, France
- Died: April 1973 (aged 73)
- Occupation: Actor
- Years active: 1930-1943 (film)

Maurice Rémy (1899–1973) was a French film and stage actor. He appeared in the 1943 antimasonic propaganda film Forces occultes during the German occupation as well as antisemitic radio programmes. Fearing repercussions after the Liberation he emigrated to Argentina.

== Selected filmography ==
- I'll Be Alone After Midnight (1931)
- The Triangle of Fire (1932)
- Cognasse (1932)
- Le Jugement de minuit (1933)
- Topaze (1933)
- Goodbye, Beautiful Days (1933)
- The Case of Doctor Brenner (1933)
- La dame de chez Maxim's (1933)
- Lake of Ladies (1934)
- Last Hour (1934)
- The Fakir of the Grand Hotel (1934)
- The Men Without Names (1937)
- The Girls of the Rhône (1938)
- Fort Dolorès (1939)
- Le café du port (1940)
- Forces occultes (1943)
- The Heart of a Nation (1943)

== Bibliography ==
- Hayward, Susan. French National Cinema. Routledge, 2006.
- Michalczyk, John J. Filming the End of the Holocaust: Allied Documentaries, Nuremberg and the Liberation of the Concentration Camps. Bloomsbury Publishing, 2014.
