= Topaze (1933 French film) =

1933 film

- Directed by: Louis J. Gasnier
- Written by: Louis J. Gasnier; Léopold Marchand; Marcel Pagnol (play)
- Produced by: Marcel Pagnol
- Starring: Louis Jouvet; Simone Héliard; Marcel Vallée
- Cinematography: Fred Langenfeld
- Production company: Les Films Paramount
- Distributed by: Les Films Paramount
- Release date: 6 January 1933
- Running time: 103 minutes
- Country: France
- Language: French

Topaze is a 1933 French comedy film directed by Louis J. Gasnier and starring Louis Jouvet, Simone Héliard and Marcel Vallée. It is based on the 1928 play Topaze by Marcel Pagnol. The same year, an American version of the play Topaze was released, starring John Barrymore. In 1936, Pagnol himself remade the film in France.

It was made at the Joinville Studios in Paris by the French subsidiary of Paramount Pictures. The film's sets were designed by the art director René Renoux.

== Synopsis ==
An earnest schoolteacher who teaches his pupils that honesty is the best policy eventually changes his mind when confronted with the corruption of the business world.

== Cast ==
- Louis Jouvet as Albert Topaze
- Simone Héliard as Ernestine
- Marcel Vallée as Muche
- Jane Loury as Baronne Pitart Vergolles
- Maurice Rémy as Roger de Tréville
- Pierre Larquey as Tamise
- Edwige Feuillère as Suzy Courtois
- Camille Beuve as Le mâitre-chanteur
- Henri Vilbert as Un agent de police
- Micheline Bernard
- Jacqueline Delubac
- Raymonde Debrennes

== Bibliography ==
- Goble, Alan. The Complete Index to Literary Sources in Film. Walter de Gruyter, 1999.
