= Lucien Duboscq =

French actor

- Born: 1893; France
- Died: 1935 (aged 41–42)
- Occupation: Actor
- Years active: 1921–1933 (film)

Lucien Duboscq (1893-1935) was a French stage actor. He also starred in two films, including the 1933 drama In Old Alsace.

He was a member of the Comédie-Française.

== Bibliography ==
- Crisp, Colin. French Cinema—A Critical Filmography: Volume 1, 1929-1939. Indiana University Press, 2015.
