= The Abbot Constantine (1925 film) =

1925 film

- Directed by: Julien Duvivier
- Written by: Ludovic Halévy (novel); Julien Duvivier
- Starring: Jean Coquelin; Pierre Stéphen; Claude France
- Cinematography: André Dantan; Ganzli Walter
- Production company: Les Films Marcel Vandal et Charles Delac
- Distributed by: Films Petit
- Release date: 9 October 1925
- Running time: 73 minutes
- Country: France
- Languages: Silent; French intertitles

The Abbot Constantine (French: L'abbé Constantin) is a 1925 French silent comedy film directed by Julien Duvivier and starring Jean Coquelin, Pierre Stéphen and Claude France. It is based on the novel The Abbot Constantine by Ludovic Halévy. The novel was remade as a sound film in 1933.

== Synopsis ==
A French Catholic Priest is horrified when he learns that two Protestant American women have moved in nearby. However he is soon on good terms with them, and his nephew eventually falls in love with one of them.

== Cast ==
- Jean Coquelin as L'abbé Constantin
- Pierre Stéphen as Paul de Lavardens
- Claude France as Mrs. Scott
- Georges Lannes as Jean Reynaud
- Geneviève Cargese as Bettina Percival
- Louisa de Mornand as Comtesse de Lavardens
- Georges Deneubourg as Comte de Larnac
- Angèle Decori as Pauline
- Roberto Pla as Bernard, le jardinier
- Robby Guichard
- Lionel Salem

== Bibliography ==
- Goble, Alan. The Complete Index to Literary Sources in Film. Walter de Gruyter, 1999.
