= Jean Weber =

French actor

- Born: 25 January 1906; Paris, France
- Died: 13 October 1995 (aged 89); Neuilly-Sur-Seine, France
- Occupation: Actor
- Years active: 1929–1984

Jean Weber (25 January 1906 – 13 October 1995) was a French film actor.

== Selected filmography ==
- The Queen's Necklace (1929)
- Figaro (1929)
- The Eaglet (1931)
- The Man at Midnight (1931)
- Take Care of Amelie (1932)
- A Telephone Call (1932)
- The Invisible Woman (1933)
- Heartbeat (1938)
- Tricoche and Cacolet (1938)
- If Paris Were Told to Us (1956)

== Bibliography ==
- Goble, Alan. The Complete Index to Literary Sources in Film. Walter de Gruyter, 1999.
