= Quay of Grenelle =

1950 film directed by Emil-Edwin Reinert

- Directed by: Emil-Edwin Reinert
- Written by: Pierre Laroche; Emil-Edwin Reinert
- Based on: La mort à boire by Jacques Laurent
- Produced by: Robert Woog
- Starring: Henri Vidal; Maria Mauban; Françoise Arnoul
- Cinematography: Marcel Grignon
- Edited by: Victoria Mercanton
- Music by: Joe Hajos
- Production companies: Films Metzger et Woog; Filmsonor
- Distributed by: Union Française de Production Cinématographique
- Release date: 26 October 1950
- Running time: 100 minutes
- Country: France
- Language: French

Quay of Grenelle (langx|fr|Quai de Grenelle) is a 1950 French crime drama film directed by Emil-Edwin Reinert and starring Henri Vidal, Maria Mauban and Françoise Arnoul. It was shot at the Billancourt Studios in Paris. The film's sets were designed by the art director Lucien Aguettand. The film takes its title from a Paris street of the same name.

== Synopsis ==
A young man is wrongly accused of taking part in a robbery and is hunted by the police across Paris.

== Cast ==
- Henri Vidal as Jean-Louis Lavalade
- Maria Mauban as Mado
- Françoise Arnoul as Simone Lamy
- Micheline Francey as Janine Crioux
- Margo Lion as Madame Chotard
- Robert Dalban as L'inspecteur Corbès
- Jean Hébey as Monsieur Chotard
- Gabrielle Fontan as La vieille dame
- Eliane Saint-Jean as Gisèle Pourqueux
- Michel Salina as Le commissaire
- Pierre Asso as Le vieux du village
- Hennery as Lorillon - le préposé du commissaire
- Georges Paulais as Le chef de rayon de l'Uniprix
- Émile Genevois as Le vendeur de journaux
- Paul Faivre as Le receveur
- Louis de Funès as Monsieur Vincent - le quincailler
- Gilberte Géniat as La caissière
- René Hell as L'hôtelier
- Liliane Lesaffre as L'habilleuse

== Bibliography ==
- Goble, Alan. The Complete Index to Literary Sources in Film. Walter de Gruyter, 1999.
