= Léon Belières =

French actor (1880–1952)

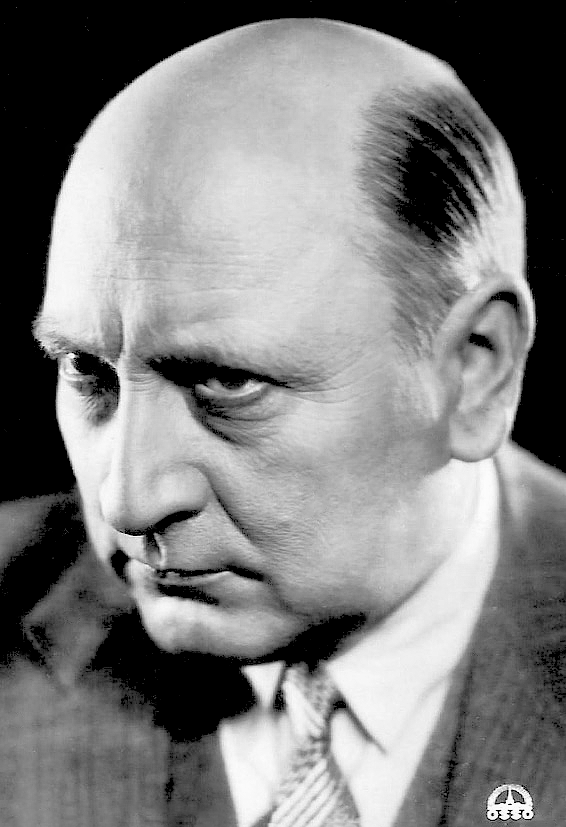
- Born: 14 December 1880; Paris, France
- Died: 10 January 1952 (aged 71); Paris, France
- Occupation: Actor
- Years active: 1911-1952 (film)

Léon Belières (1880–1952) was a French film actor.

== Selected filmography ==
- Figaro (1929)
- Levy and Company (1930)
- A Hole in the Wall (1930)
- The Road Is Fine (1930)
- Atlantis (1930)
- The Mystery of the Yellow Room (1930)
- The Perfume of the Lady in Black (1931)
- Max and His Mother-in-Law (1931)
- The Levy Department Stores (1932)
- Rouletabille the Aviator (1932)
- To the Polls, Citizens (1932)
- The Surprises of Divorce (1933)
- The Ironmaster (1933)
- The Abbot Constantine (1933)
- Charlemagne (1933)
- The Queen of Biarritz (1934)
- Moses and Solomon, Perfumers (1935)
- Topaze (1936)
- The Marriages of Mademoiselle Levy (1936)
- Paid Holidays (1938)
- Heartbeat (1938)
- Monsieur Brotonneau (1939)
- Three from St Cyr (1939)
- Miquette (1940)
- Last Adventure (1942)
- Don't Shout It from the Rooftops (1943)
- The Midnight Sun (1943)
- The Grand Hotel Affair (1946)
- Millionaires for One Day (1949)
- Love in the Vineyard (1952)

== Bibliography ==
- Goble, Alan. The Complete Index to Literary Sources in Film. Walter de Gruyter, 1999.
