= Charles Lamy =

French actor

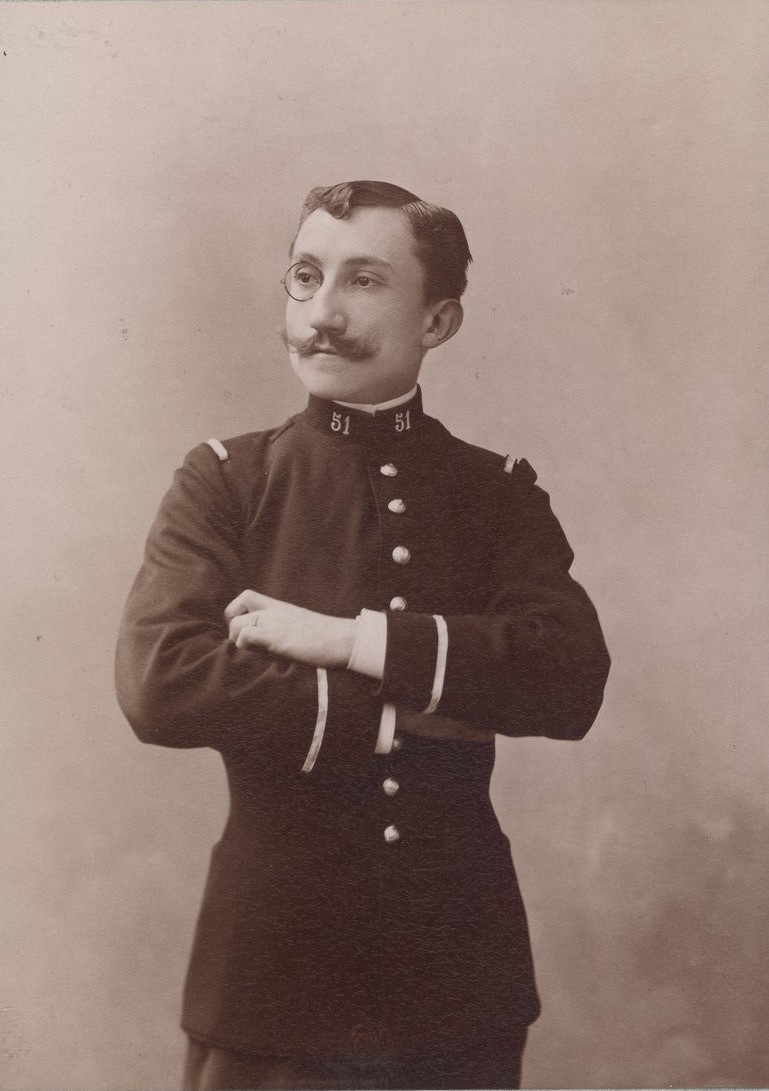
Charles Lamy in 1893

Charles Lamy or M. Lamy (28 August 1857 – 15 June 1940) was the stage name of the French actor Charles Castarède.

== Life and career ==
Lamy was born in Lyon to a theatrical family. His younger brother Maurice became an actor. He began his stage career in 1874 in Saint-Etienne, at the Grand-Théâtre, which was directed by his father. After performing in Lyon (1875) and Marseille (1876–77) he spent two years at the Conservatoire de Lyon, while performing at the Théâtre des Célestins (1876-78). He began a career as a singer in Italy (1878–79), moving to Brussels (1879-80). He made his Paris debut at the Théâtre des Bouffes-Parisiens as Prince Fritellini in La Mascotte (December 1880). At the same theatre he created roles in other comic operas including Gillette de Narbonne, Madame Boniface, Joséphine and Coquelicot. At the Théâtre de la Renaissance he created the role of Biju in Léon Vasseur's La Famille Vénus, and at the Théâtre-Lyrique he created the role of Kangourou in André Messager's Madame Chrysanthème. Returning to the Bouffes he appeared in works including Les Forains, L'Homme de neige, Fleur de vertu, L'enlèvement de la Toledad, La dot de Brigitte and M. Lohengrin.

At the Théâtre du Palais-Royal between 1897 and 1905 Lamy appeared in 22 productions:Les Fêtards (Antony Mars, 1897), La Culotte (Louis Artus, 1898), Le Boulet (Pierre Wolff, 1898), Place aux femmes (Albin Valabrègue, 1898), Chéri! (Paul Gavault, 1898), La Mouche (Mars, 1899), L'Élu des femmes (Victor Cottens, 1899), Coralie et compagnie (Valabrègue, 1899), Moins cinq... (Paul Gavault, 1900), Sacré Léonce (Wolff, 1901), Bichette (Alexandre Fontanes, 1901), L'Affaire Mathieu (Tristan Bernard, 1901), L'Inconnue (Gavault, 1901), Le Sublime Ernest (Valabrègue, 1902), Family-Hôtel (Eugène Héros, 1902), La Carotte (Georges Berr, 1902), Les Apaches (Alexandre Bisson, 1903), Les Dragées d'Hercule (Paul Bilhaud, 1904), L'Escapade (Berr, 1904), Le Maroquin (Julien Berr de Turrique, 1904), Une affaire scandaleuse (Gavault, 1904), and La Marche forcée (Berr, 1905). Between 1906 and 1926 he appeared in a further 13 productions at the Palais-Royal and six other Paris theatres.

Lamy died in Orléans in 1940. He was killed along with his son Adrien in a German bombing raid.

== Films ==
Lamy was often cast to play aristocratic characters. His film appearances include:

- The Mysteries of Paris (1922)
- The Crime of Bouif (1922)
- My Uncle Benjamin (1924)
- Monte Carlo (1925)
- Montmartre (1925)
- Cousin Bette (1928)
- The Fall of the House of Usher (1928)
- The Crime of Sylvestre Bonnard (1929)
- Tarakanova (1930)
- Levy and Company (1930)
- Black and White (1931)
- The Darling of Paris (1931)
- The Levy Department Stores (1932)
- That Scoundrel Morin (1932)
- Honeymoon Trip (1933)
- The Surprises of Divorce (1933)
- One Night's Song (1933)
- Moses and Solomon, Perfumers (1935)
- Bourrasque (1935)
- The Marriages of Mademoiselle Levy (1936)
- The Green Jacket (1937)

== Sources ==
- Martin, Jules (1901). Nos artistes: annuaire des théâtres et concerts, 1901–1902. Paris: Ollendorf.

== Bibliography ==
- Crisp, C.G. Genre, myth, and convention in the French cinema, 1929-1939. Indiana University Press, 2002
