= The Abbot Constantine (1933 film) =

1933 film directed by Jean-Paul Paulin

- Directed by: Jean-Paul Paulin
- Screenplay by: Charles Spaak
- Based on: L'Abbé Constantin by Hector Crémieux and Pierre Decourcelle; The Abbot Constantine by Ludovic Halévy
- Starring: Léon Belières; Françoise Rosay; Claude Dauphin; Betty Stockfeld
- Cinematography: Léonce-Henri Burel
- Edited by: Marguerite Beaugé
- Music by: Michel Michelet
- Production companies: Aster-Film; Films P.A.P.
- Release date: 20 October 1933
- Running time: 90 minutes
- Country: France
- Language: French

The Abbot Constantine (French: L'Abbé Constantin) is a 1933 French comedy film directed by Jean-Paul Paulin and starring Léon Belières, Françoise Rosay and Claude Dauphin. It is based on the play by Hector Crémieux and Pierre Decourcelle, which in turn was based on Ludovic Halévy's novel The Abbot Constantine. The novel had previously been made into a 1925 silent film of the same title.

== Cast ==
- Léon Belières as L'abbé Constantin
- Françoise Rosay as La comtesse de Laverdens
- Claude Dauphin as Paul de Laverdens
- Betty Stockfeld as Mrs. Scott
- Jean Martinelli as Jean Reynaud
- Josseline Gaël as Bettina Perceval
- Pauline Carton as Pauline
- Robert Moor as Comte de Larnac
- Anthony Gildès as Le créancier
- Marcel Barnault
- George André Martin

== Bibliography ==
- Goble, Alan. The Complete Index to Literary Sources in Film. Walter de Gruyter, 1999. ISBN 978-1-85739-229-6.
