= Levy and Company =

1930 film

- Directed by: André Hugon
- Written by: Roger Ferdinand; Docteur Gourevitch; André Hugon; Jean Toulout
- Produced by: André Hugon; Bernard Natan; Emile Natan
- Starring: Léon Belières; Charles Lamy; Alexandre Mihalesco
- Cinematography: Raymond Agnel; Jean Bachelet; Henri Barreyre; René Colas; Maurice Guillemin
- Edited by: Marguerite Beaugé
- Music by: René Sylviano
- Production companies: Hugon-Films; Pathé-Natan
- Distributed by: Pathé Consortium Cinéma
- Release date: 24 October 1930
- Running time: 105 minutes
- Country: France
- Language: French

Levy and Company (French: Lévy et Cie) is a 1930 French comedy film directed by André Hugon starring Léon Belières, Charles Lamy and Alexandre Mihalesco. The film takes place on a liner which is sailing for New York. It was a success and was followed by three sequels including The Levy Department Stores.

The film's art direction was by Christian-Jaque.

== Cast ==
- Henri Bargin
- Lucien Baroux as Louis
- Léon Belières as Salomon Lévy
- Jeanne Bernard
- André Burgère as David Lévy
- Marie Glory as Esther Lévy
- Charles Lamy as Moïse Lévy
- Lugné-Poe as Abraham Lévy
- Rodolphe Marcilly
- Micheline Masson
- Alexandre Mihalesco as Simon Lévy

== Bibliography ==
- Hayward, Susan. French National Cinema. Routledge, 2006.
