= René Colas =

French cinematographer

- Born: 26 July 1901; Paris
- Died: 16 October 1984 (aged 83); Mervent (Vendée)
- Occupation: Cinematographer

René Colas (26 July 1901 – 16 October 1984) was a French cinematographer whose parents collaborated with Georges Méliès at the time of his birth.

== Filmography ==
- 1926 : The Nude Woman by Léonce Perret
- 1928 : The Orchid Dancer by Léonce Perret
- 1928 : Morgane la sirène by Léonce Perret
- 1930 : L'Escale by Jean Gourguet
- 1930 : L'Arlésienne by Jacques de Baroncelli
- 1930 : My Childish Father by Jean de Limur
- 1930 : Levy and Company by André Hugon
- 1930 : La Femme et le Rossignol by André Hugon
- 1932 : Paris-Méditerranée by Joe May
- 1932 : Fun in the Barracks by Maurice Tourneur
- 1933 : Toto de Jacques Tourneur
- 1933 : Charlemagne by Pierre Colombier
- 1933 : Knock by Roger Goupillières and Louis Jouvet
- 1934 : A Man Has Been Stolen by Max Ophüls
- 1934 : Le Centenaire, short film by Pierre-Jean Ducis
- 1934 : The Uncle from Peking by Jacques Darmont
- 1934 : Primerose by René Guissart
- 1935 : Jim la Houlette by André Berthomieu
- 1935 : Justin de Marseille by Maurice Tourneur
- 1935 : Crime and Punishment by Pierre Chenal
- 1936 : Tout va très bien madame la marquise by Henry Wulschleger
- 1936 : Samson by Maurice Tourneur
- 1937 : The Ladies in the Green Hats by Maurice Cloche
- 1937 : À nous deux, madame la vie by René Guissart and Yves Mirande
- 1937 : The Fraudster by Léopold Simons
- 1938 : Le Cantinier de la coloniale by Henry Wulschleger
- 1938 : Sommes-nous défendus ? by Jean Loubignac (in collaboration with Hervé Missir, Charles Barrois, Gaston Chelle)
- 1938 : Gargousse by Henry Wulschleger
- 1941 : Volpone by Maurice Tourneur
- 1942 : Pension Jonas by Pierre Caron
- 1943 : La Chèvre d'or by René Barberis
- 1945 : Blondine by Henri Mahé
- 1946 : Le Gardian by Jean de Marguenat
- 1946 : Madame et son flirt by Jean de Marguenat
- 1948 : The Woman I Murdered, by Jacques Daniel-Norman
- 1949 : My Aunt from Honfleur by René Jayet
- 1949 : Jo la Romance by Gilles Grangier
- 1950 : La Maison du printemps by Jacques Daroy
- 1950 : Le Gang des tractions-arrière by Jean Loubignac
- 1951 : Piédalu in Paris by Jean Loubignac
- 1952 : Piédalu Works Miracles by Jean Loubignac
- 1952 : Foyer perdu by Jean Loubignac
- 1953 : Quintuplets in the Boarding School by René Jayet
- 1954 : Ah! Les belles bacchantes by Jean Loubignac
- 1955 : Arthur Honegger, short film by Georges Rouquier
- 1959 : Marche ou crève by Georges Lautner
