= André Mouëzy-Éon =

French actor (1880–1967)

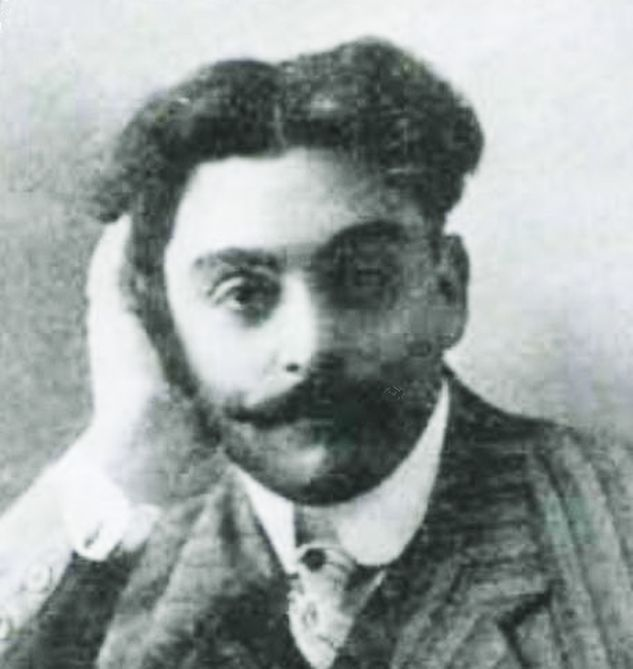
- André Mouëzy-Éon around 1910
- Born: André Marie Joseph Mouëzy-Éon; 9 June 1880; Chantenay-sur-Loire, Loire-Atlantique
- Died: 23 October 1967 (aged 87); 16th arrondissement of Paris
- Occupations: Dramatist, screenwriter, dialoguist

André Mouëzy-Éon (9 June 1880 – 23 October 1967) was a French dramatist, author of comedies, librettist, screenwriter and dialoguist.

== Biography ==
André Mouëzy-Éon begins his career by writing short plays for the Théâtre de Cluny, located in the Latin quarter of Paris. After his conscription and before World War I, he became famous by going into the military vaudeville, a popular genre at the time with plays like Tire au flanc, Le Tampon du capiston, then Les Dégourdis de la 11e.

After the war, he collaborated with Nicolas Nancey on L'Héritier du bal Tabarin in 1919 and Il est cocu, le chef de gare in 1925.

During the 1920s, he gained interest in operetta and created several extravaganza pieces, operettas and sketch comedies with a famous author by the name of Albert Willemetz.

In 1924, the operetta Les Amants de Venise is created at the Opéra-Comique. The piece is performed again in 1928, at the théâtre Marigny under the title Venise.

In 1950 le théâtre du Châtelet sets up Pour Don Carlos, music by Francis Lopez, libretto by André Mouëzy-Éon.

== Plays and operettas ==
- Tire-au-flanc. Vaudeville in three acts (with André Sylvane, 1904)
- L'Enfant de ma sœur. Play in three acts (with Robert Francheville, 12 November 1908)
- Les Dégourdis de la 11e. Vaudeville in three acts (with Charles Daveillans, 20 November 1913)
- La Folle Nuit. Conte galant in three acts (with Félix Gandéra, music by Marcel Pollet, at the théâtre Édouard VII, 5 April 1917)
- La Petite Bonne d'Abraham. Conte biblique in three acts (with Félix Gandéra, music by Marcel Pollet, at the théâtre Édouard VII, 13 December 1917)
- Le Tampon du capiston. Vaudeville in three acts (with Alfred Vercourt and Jean Bever, 1918)
- La Liaison dangereuse (1 January 1919)
- L'Héritier du bal Tabarin. Vaudeville in three acts (with Nicolas Nancey, 1919)
- Le Crime du Bouif. Crime drama in four acts (based on a novel by Georges de La Fouchardière, 4 February 1921)
- Bibi-la-Purée. Play in four acts (with Alexandre Fontanes, 1924)
- Il est cocu, le chef de gare. Vaudeville in three acts (with Nicolas Nancey, 1924)
- Au premier de ces messieurs. Play in three acts (with Yves Mirande, 14 May 1926)
- Plein aux as. Play in four acts (with Alexandre Fontanes, based on the novel Flipotte by Henry Kistemaeckers, at the Théâtre de l'Ambigu-Comique, 1926)
- Venise (25 June 1927)
- Le Renard chez les poules (31 January 1929)
- Olive (2 November 1929)
- L'Amour à l'américaine. Comedy in three acts (with Robert Spitzer, 20 March 1930)
- Sidonie Panache. Operetta in two acts (with Albert Willemetz, music by Josef Szulc, 6 December 1930)
- La Chienne. Play in three acts (based on a novel by Georges de La Fouchardière, 12 December 1930)
- 600 000 francs par mois. Play in three acts (with Albert-Jean, based on a novel by Jean Drault, 9 November 1931)
- Nina-Rosa (22 December 1931)
- La Tulipe noire (18 March 1932)
- La Dubarry (21 October 1933)
- Rose de France (28 October 1933)
- The Great Waltz (21 December 1933)
- Au temps des Merveilleuses (25 December 1934)
- Un coup de veine (11 October 1935)
- Au soleil du Mexique (18 December 1935)
- Yana (24 December 1936)
- Le Chant du tzigane (11 December 1937)
- La Margoton du bataillon (22 December 1937)
- Billie et son équipe by Michel Emer and Jean Sautreuil, libretto by André Mouëzy-Éon and Albert Willemetz, Théâtre Mogador (6 March 1939)
- Théâtre du Grand Guignol
  - 1941 : La Bonne Tempête
  - 1941 : La Sauce archiduc
  - 1942 : Fermeture éclair
  - 1943 : Lune rousse
  - 1944 : Factice
  - 1946 : Monsieur est servi
- Chanson gitane, operetta by A. Mouezy-Eon and Maurice Yvain (December 1946, Gaîté Lyrique)
- Pour Don Carlos, music by Francis Lopez, libretto by André Mouëzy-Éon, songs by Raymond Vincy after Pierre Benoit, mise en scène Maurice Lehmann (1950, Théâtre du Châtelet)

== Filmography ==
=== Films based on plays by André Mouëzy-Éon ===
- Le Crime du Bouif, directed by Henri Pouctal (France, 1922, based on the play Le Crime du Bouif)
- Bibi-la-Purée, directed by Maurice Champreux (France, 1926, based on the play Bibi-la-Purée)
- Tire-au-flanc, directed by Jean Renoir (France, 1928, based on the play Tire-au-flanc)
- Le Tampon du capiston, directed by Jean Toulout and Joé Francis (France, 1930, based on the play Le Tampon du capiston)
- The Matrimonial Bed, directed by Michael Curtiz (1930, based on the play Au premier de ces messieurs)
- La Chienne, directed by Jean Renoir (France, 1931, based on the play La Chienne)
- American Love (film), directed by Claude Heymann and Paul Fejos (France, 1931, based on the play L'Amour à l'américaine)
- The Mad Night, directed by Robert Bibal (France, 1932, based on the play La Folle Nuit)
- L'Enfant de ma sœur, directed by Henry Wulschleger (France, 1933, based on the play L'Enfant de ma sœur)
- Le Crime du Bouif, directed by André Berthomieu (France, 1933, based on the play Le Crime du Bouif)
- Tire-au-flanc, directed by Henry Wulschleger (France, 1933, based on the play Tire-au-flanc)
- Ah! Quelle gare!, directed by René Guissart (France, 1933, based on the play Il est cocu, le chef de gare)
- 600,000 Francs a Month, directed by Léo Joannon (France, 1933, based on the play 600 000 francs par mois)
- L'Héritier du bal Tabarin, directed by Jean Kemm (France, 1933, based on the play L'Héritier du bal Tabarin)
- Plein aux as, directed by Jacques Houssin (France, 1933, based on the play Plein aux as)
- Sidonie Panache, directed by Henry Wulschleger (France, 1934, based on the operetta Sidonie Panache)
- Bibi-la-Purée, directed by Léo Joannon (France, 1935, based on the play Bibi-la-Purée)
- Mr. What's-His-Name?, directed by Ralph Ince (UK, 1935, based on the play Au premier de ces messieurs)
- Les Dégourdis de la 11e, directed by Christian-Jaque (France, 1937, based on the play Les Dégourdis de la 11e)
- Station Master, directed by Jan Sviták (Czechoslovakia, 1941, based on the play Il est cocu, le chef de gare)
- Kisses for Breakfast, directed by Lewis Seiler (English, 1941, based on the play Au premier de ces messieurs)
- Scarlet Street, directed by Fritz Lang (1945, based on the play La Chienne)
- El tercer huésped, directed by Eduardo Boneo (Argentina, 1946, based on the play Il est cocu, le chef de gare)
- Le Tampon du capiston, directed by Maurice Labro (France, 1950, based on the play Le Tampon du capiston)
- Tire-au-flanc, directed by Fernand Rivers (France, 1950, based on the play Tire-au-flanc)
- Le Crime du Bouif, directed by André Cerf (France, 1952, based on the play Le Crime du Bouif)
- The Army Game, directed by Claude de Givray and François Truffaut (France, 1961, based on the play Tire-au-flanc)
- Cristóbal Colón en la Facultad de Medicina, directed by Julio Saraceni (Argentina, 1962, based on the play L'Enfant de ma sœur)
- Canuto Cañete, conscripto del siete, directed by Leo Fleider (Argentina, 1963, based on the play Tire-au-flanc)
- Gran valor en la facultad de medicina, directed by Enrique Cahen Salaberry (Argentina, 1981, based on the play L'Enfant de ma sœur)

=== Screenwriter ===
- 1930 : La Meilleure Bobonne (dir. Marc Allégret) (short film)
- 1932 : The Blaireau Case (dir. Henry Wulschleger)
- 1933 : La Margoton du bataillon (dir. Jacques Darmont)
- 1933 : Les Deux Monsieur de Madame (dir. Abel Jacquin and Georges Pallu)
- 1933 : Tout pour rien (dir. René Pujol)
- 1933 : Faut réparer Sophie (dir. Alexandre Ryder)
- 1934 : Sans famille (dir. Marc Allégret)
- 1936 : Story of a Poor Young Man (dir. Abel Gance)
- 1936 : Bach the Detective (dir. René Pujol)
- 1936 : J'arrose mes galons (dir. René Pujol and Jacques Darmont)
- 1938 : Le Plus Beau Gosse de France (dir. René Pujol)
- 1943 : Feu Nicolas (dir. Jacques Houssin)
- 1958 : Sacrée Jeunesse (dir. André Berthomieu)

=== Actor ===
- 1950 : Tire-au-flanc (dir. Fernand Rivers)
- 1961 : The Army Game (dir. Claude de Givray and François Truffaut)

== Books ==
- André Mouëzy-Éon, Les Adieux de la troupe : souvenirs de théâtre, éditions La Table ronde, 1963 OCLC 21267818
