= Jacques Baumer =

French theatre director and comedian (1885-1951)

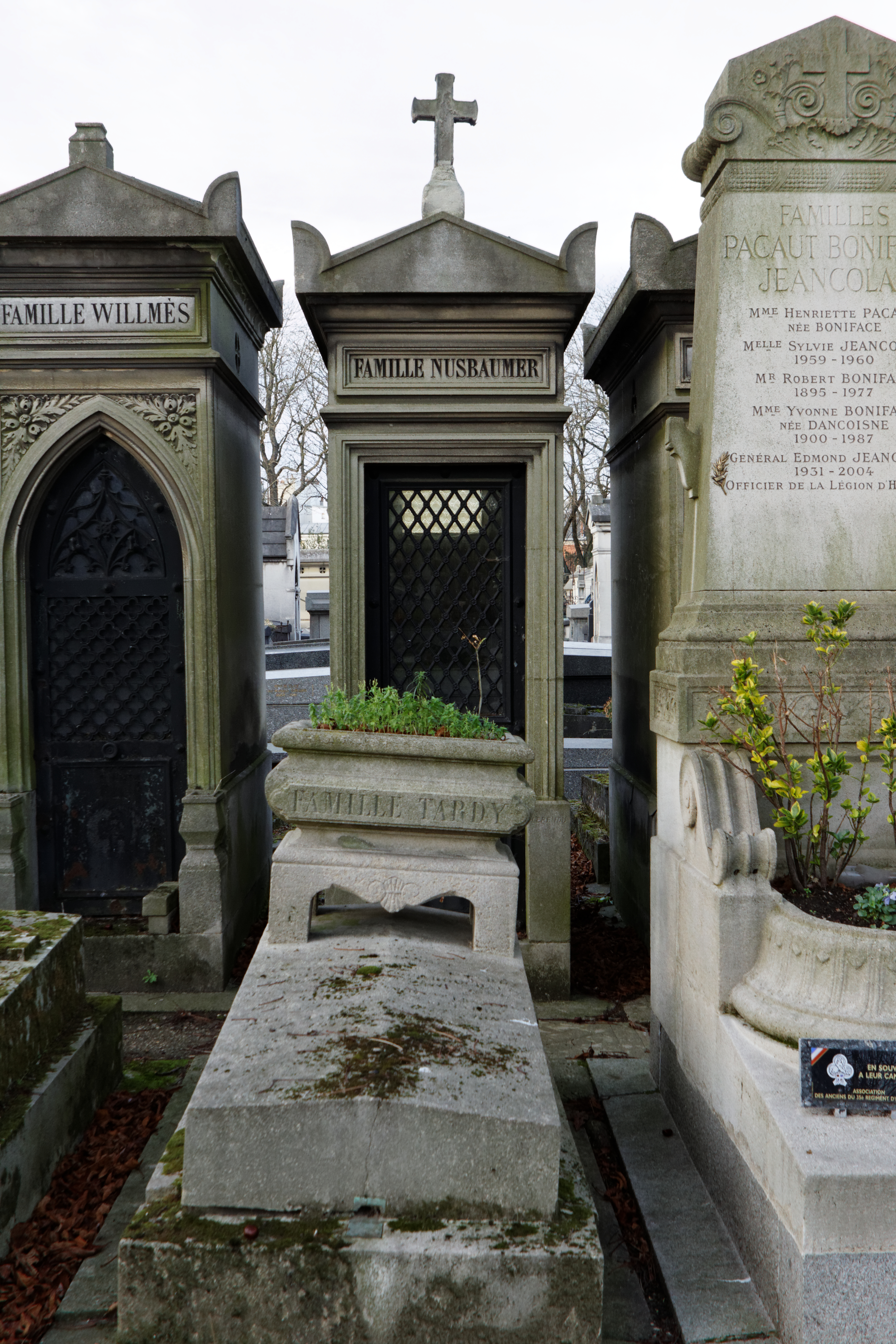
- Grave at the cimetière du Père-Lachaise
- Born: Jacques Henri Nusbaume; 12 April 1885; Paris, France
- Died: 20 June 1951 (aged 66); Montchauvet, Yvelines, France

Jacques Baumer (born Jacques Henri Nusbaumer; 12 April 1885 – 20 June 1951), was a French theatre director and comedian.

== Filmography ==
- 1932: That Scoundrel Morin by Georges Lacombe
- 1933: Étienne by Jean Tarride
- 1936: La Reine des resquilleuses by Max Glass and Marco de Gastyne – (M. Legrand)
- 1936: L'Homme sans cœur by Léo Joannon - (Jeanton)
- 1936: La Belle Équipe by Julien Duvivier - (M. Jubette)
- 1937: Southern Mail by Pierre Billon – (Le procureur)
- 1937: La Porte du large by Marcel L'Herbier - (commandant Bovy)
- 1937: Gribouille by Marc Allégret - (M. Morinier)
- 1937: Mollenard by Robert Siodmak
- 1937: Désiré by Sacha Guitry - (Félix)
- 1937: Feu! by Jacques de Baroncelli - (Di-Larco)
- 1937: A Picnic on the Grass by Marcel Cravenne - (M. Fleury-Vallée)
- 1937: Double Crime in the Maginot Line by Félix Gandera - (inspector Finois)
- 1938: La Glu by Jean Choux - (doctor Cézambre)
- 1938: La Piste du sud by Pierre Billon - (Gomez)
- 1938: Café de Paris by Yves Mirande and Georges Lacombe - (Le commissaire de police)
- 1938: Légions d'honneur by Maurice Gleize -
- 1938: Rasputin by Marcel L'Herbier - (Prokoff)
- 1938: Durand Jewellers by Jean Stelli
- 1938: Final Accord by J. Rosenkranz - (M. Hénard)
- 1939: Le Jour Se Lève by Marcel Carné
- 1939: Entente cordiale by Marcel L'Herbier - (Clemenceau)
- 1939: Behind the Facade by Yves Mirande and Georges Lacombe -
- 1940: Paris-New York by Yves Mirande -
- 1942: The Strangers in the House (film) by Henri Decoin - (Gérard Rogissart)
- 1942: Les Ailes blanches by Robert Péguy - (Henri Lebourg)
- 1942: Business Is Business by Jean Dréville - (Grugh)
- 1942: L'Appel du bled by Maurice Gleize - (the doctor)
- 1942: The Benefactor by Henri Decoin - (director of P.J)
- 1942: Mahlia la métisse by Walter Kapps
- 1942: Mademoiselle Béatrice by Max de Vaucorbeil - (Maître Bergas)
- 1943: The Count of Monte Cristo (1943 film) by Robert Vernay - (Noirtier), Edmond Dantès during the first period
- 1943: Le Colonel Chabert by René Le Hénaff - (M. Delbecq)
- 1943: L'Éternel Retour by Jean Delannoy
- 1943: Coup de tête by René Le Hénaff - (M. Vorage)
- 1944: Les Caves du Majestic by Richard Pottier - (Arthur Donge)
- 1947: Par la fenêtre by Gilles Grangier - (M. Miroud, the commanditaire)
- 1948: Dilemma of Two Angels by Maurice Tourneur - (Jérôme)
- 1948: Le Comédien by Sacha Guitry - (M. Maillard)
- 1949: Millionaires for One Day by André Hunebelle - (president of the court)
- 1949: 'Night Round by François Campaux - (judge)
- 1949: Le Furet by Raymond Leboursier - (Le commissaire Hyacinthe)
- 1949: Manèges by Yves Allégret - (Louis)
- 1950: Just Me by Marc-Gilbert Sauvajon - (Maître Dubuisson)
- 1951: Darling Caroline by Richard Pottier -

== Theatre ==
=== Comedian ===
- 1921: La Souriante Madame Beudet by Denys Amiel and André Obey, Théâtre de Paris
- 1923: La Vagabonde by Colette and Léopold Marchand, théâtre de la Renaissance
- 1924: La Galerie des glaces by Henri Bernstein, Théâtre du Gymnase
- 1927: Vient de paraître (pièce de théâtre) by Édouard Bourdet, directed by Victor Boucher, Théâtre de la Michodière
- 1929: Durand, bijoutier by Léopold Marchand, Théâtre Saint-Georges
- 1930: Étienne by Jacques Deval, Théâtre Saint-Georges
- 1933: Karma by Jeffrey Dell, Théâtre de l'Œuvre
- 1934: Les Temps difficiles by Édouard Bourdet, Théâtre de la Michodière
- 1936: Europe by Maurice Rostand, Théâtre Pigalle
- 1936: La vie est si courte by Léopold Marchand, Théâtre Pigalle
- 1938: Duo de Paul Géraldy, directed by Jean Wall, Théâtre Saint-Georges
- 1941: La Machine à écrire by Jean Cocteau, directed by Jean Cocteau, Théâtre Hébertot
- 1943: Clotilde du Mesnil by Henry Becque, directed by Alice Cocéa, Théâtre des Ambassadeurs
- 1943: Mais n'te promène donc pas toute nue ! by Georges Feydeau, directed by Alice Cocéa, Théâtre des Ambassadeurs
- 1943: À la gloire d'Antoine by Sacha Guitry, Théâtre Antoine
- 1947: Nuits noires by John Steinbeck, directed by Henri Rollan, Théâtre Saint-Georges
- 1944: Mademoiselle Antoinette by Jean Guitton, Théâtre de l'Apollo
- 1950: Harvey by Mary Chase, mise-en-scène Marcel Achard, Théâtre Antoine

=== Theatre director ===
- 1929: L'Amoureuse Aventure by Paul Armont and Marcel Gerbidon, Théâtre Édouard VII
- 1930: Mistigri by Marcel Achard, Théâtre Daunou
- 1930: Langrevin père et fils by Tristan Bernard, Théâtre des Nouveautés
- 1931: Le Cyclone de Somerset Maugham, Théâtre des Ambassadeurs
- 1932: Mademoiselle (pièce de théâtre) by Jacques Deval, Théâtre Saint-Georges
- 1932: Trois et une by Denys Amiel, Théâtre Saint-Georges
- 1933: Lundi 8 heures by George S. Kaufman and Edna Ferber, Théâtre des Ambassadeurs
- 1934: Le Discours des prix, play with 3 acts and 4 scenes by Jean Sarment, Théâtre Saint-Georges, 27 September in Paris
- 1934: Liberté provisoire by Michel Duran, Théâtre Saint-Georges
- 1936: Ma liberté by Denys Amiel, Théâtre Saint-Georges
- 1942: Les Inséparables by Germaine Lefrancq, Théâtre de Paris
- 1942: Les J3 ou la nouvelle école by Roger Ferdinand, Théâtre des Bouffes-Parisiens
- 1946: Ce soir je suis garçon ! by Yves Mirande & André Mouëzy-Éon, Théâtre Antoine
- 1946: Les Derniers Seigneurs by Roger Ferdinand, Théâtre Édouard VII
- 1946: La Nuit du 16 janvier by Ayn Rand, Théâtre de l'Apollo
- 1946: Étienne by Jacques Deval, Théâtre La Bruyère
- 1948: Ils ont vingt ans by Roger Ferdinand, Théâtre Daunou
- 1954: Les J3 de Roger Ferdinand, Théâtre de l'Ambigu-Comique

== Bibliography ==
- Raymond Chirat, Olivier Barrot, Les Excentriques du cinéma français : 1929-1958, Henri Veyrier, Paris, 1983 ISBN 9782851993045
- Yvan Foucart, Dictionnaire des comédiens français disparus, Éditions cinéma, Mormoiron, 2008, 1185 p. ISBN 978-2-9531-1390-7
