= The Blaireau Case =

The Blaireau Case may refer to:

- The Blaireau Case, English language title for the 1899 novel L'affaire Blaireau by Alphonse Allais
- The Blaireau Case (1923 film), a 1923 French silent film based on the novel
- The Blaireau Case (1932 film), a 1932 French comedy drama film based on the novel

== See also ==
- Adieu Blaireau, a 1985 French film
