= Sarati the Terrible =

Sarati the Terrible may refer to:

- Sarati the Terrible (1937 film), a French drama film
- Sarati the Terrible (1923 film), a French silent film
