= André Sylvane =

French dramatist and screenwriter

- Born: March 27, 1851; L'Aigle
- Died: October 8, 1932 (aged 81); 8th arrondissement of Paris
- Occupations: dramatist and screenwriter

André Sylvane, né Paul-Émile-Gérard (27 March 1851, L'Aigle – 28 October 1932), was a French dramatist and screenwriter.

== Theatre ==
- 1893 : Madame Suzette, operetta by Maurice Ordonneau, André Sylvane and Edmond Audran
- 1894 : L'Article 214, by André Sylvane et Maurice Ordonneau, théâtre des Variétés in Paris
- 1901 : Second Ménage, comédy in three acts by Maurice Froyez and André Sylvane
- 1904 : Tire-au-flanc, play in three acts by André Mouëzy-Éon and André Sylvane, théâtre Déjazet à Paris

== Filmography ==
- 1912 : Tire-au-flanc, script by André Mouëzy-Éon and André Sylvane
- 1928 : Tire-au-flanc by Jean Renoir
- 1933 : Tire-au-flanc by Henry Wulschleger
- 1950 : Tire-au-flanc by Fernand Rivers
- 1961 : The Army Game by Claude de Givray and François Truffaut
