= Crime and Punishment (1935 French film) =

- Film poster
- French: Crime et châtiment
- Directed by: Pierre Chenal
- Written by: Marcel Aymé; Pierre Chenal; Christian Stengel; Vladimir Strizhevsky
- Based on: Crime and Punishment; 1866 novel by Fyodor Dostoevsky
- Produced by: Michel Kagansky
- Starring: Harry Baur; Pierre Blanchar; Madeleine Ozeray
- Cinematography: René Colas; Joseph-Louis Mundwiller
- Edited by: André Galitzine
- Music by: Arthur Honegger
- Production company: Général Productions
- Distributed by: Les Grands Spectacles Cinématographiques
- Release date: 15 May 1935
- Running time: 107 minutes
- Country: France
- Language: French

Crime and Punishment (French: Crime et châtiment) is a 1935 French crime drama film directed by Pierre Chenal and produced by Michel Kagansky starring Harry Baur, Pierre Blanchar and Madeleine Ozeray. It is an adaptation of the 1866 novel of the same name by Fyodor Dostoevsky. The same year a separate American film adaptation was made featuring Peter Lorre.

The film's sets were designed by the art director Aimé Bazin. Chenal rejected Bazin's original designs as too realistic and historically faithful, as he wished to create a more expressionist ambience for the film.

== Cast ==
- Harry Baur as Porphyre
- Pierre Blanchar as Rodion Raskolnikov
- Madeleine Ozeray as Sonia
- Lucienne Le Marchand as Dounia
- Marcelle Géniat as Mme Raskolnikov
- Alexandre Rignault as Razoumikhine
- Sylvie as Catherine Ivanova
- Aimé Clariond as Loujine
- Magdeleine Bérubet as Aliona
- Georges Douking as Nicolas
- Marcel Delaître as Marmeladov
- Catherine Hessling as Elisabeth
- Daniel Gilbert as Zamiatov
- Paulette Élambert as Polia
- Paul Asselin as Lieutenant Poudre
- Eugène Chevalier as Le Borgne
- Geno Ferny as Commissioner's assistant
- Claire Gérard as Nastassia
- Léon Larive as Koch
- Charles Lemontier as Pestriakov

== Critical reception ==
Writing for The Spectator in 1936, Graham Greene gave the film a moderately good review, praising the direction and the camerawork particularly during the murder scene, the fidelity of the film to the text upon which it was based, and the acting of Pierre Blanchar in portraying Raskolnikov. Of Harry Bauer's portrayal of Porphyrius, Greene described the acting as "a lovely performance, the finest I have seen in the cinema this year". For Greene, the major problem with the film was that by converting it into a film in the third party instead of approaching the tale from within Raskolnikov's mind, the film was necessarily curtailed.
