= Le diamant noir =

Le diamant noir may refer to:

- The Black Diamond (1922 film), a French silent mystery film
- The Black Diamond (1941 film), a French drama film
