= Suzet Maïs =

French actress (1908–1989)

Suzette Charlotte Marie Mathilde Roux (January 31, 1908 – January 24, 1989), screen name "Suzet Maïs", was a French stage and film actress.

== Selected filmography ==
Year	Title	Role	Notes
1930	Paris by Night	La comtesse Rita	
1931	Jean de la lune	cast	
1932	American Love	Geneviève	
1932	To Live Happily	Madeleine	
1933	Let's Touch Wood		
1933	Rivaux de la piste		
1937	Culprit		
1937	Claudine at School	Aimée Lanthenay	
1937	The Men Without Names	Jennifer	
1938	Chéri-Bibi	cast	
1939	Cocoanut		
1942	Frederica	cast	
1943	Shop Girls of Paris		
1943	Domino		
1945	Boule de suif	Mme Loiseau	
1945	Father Goriot		
1951	Atoll K	Mrs Dolan	
1951	Tomorrow We Get Divorced	Tati	
1954	Mourez, nous ferons le reste	cast	
1955	Marguerite de la nuit		
1956	The Terror with Women		
1956	Sous le ciel de Provence	Juliette Verdier	
