= The Darling of His Concierge (1951 film) =

1951 film

- Directed by: René Jayet
- Written by: Robert Bibal; Michel Méry
- Based on: The Darling of His Concierge by Raoul Praxy
- Produced by: Léon Beytout; René Pignières
- Starring: Jean Parédès; André Gabriello; Paulette Dubost
- Cinematography: Charles Bauer
- Edited by: Marinette Cadix
- Music by: Charles Henry
- Production company: Société Nouvelle de Cinématographie
- Distributed by: Société Nouvelle de Cinématographie
- Release date: 9 May 1951
- Running time: 90 minutes
- Country: France
- Language: French

The Darling of His Concierge (French: Chéri de sa concierge) is a 1951 French comedy film directed by René Jayet and starring Jean Parédès, André Gabriello and Paulette Dubost. The film's sets were designed by the art director Aimé Bazin. It is a remake of the 1934 film of the same title starring Fernandel.

== Synopsis ==
Eugène Crochard is an employee of a radio station. To play a joke on him his colleagues make a fake announcement over the airwaves that he has inherited a fortune. This leads to him being pursued by many woman who are after his money, including his concierge.

== Cast ==
- Jean Parédès as Eugène Crochard
- André Gabriello as Bébert La Bredouille
- Paulette Dubost as Mme Motte, la concierge
- Lili Bontemps as Youyou
- Frédéric Duvallès as Gandois
- René Alié as Boisgirard
- Louis Florencie as Prétendot
- Nicole Gamma as Odette
- Léon Larive as Le promeneur
- Charles Lemontier as Un commissaire
- Charles Mahieu as Vandergoote
- Marcel Melrac as Un commissaire
- Roger Méra as Un employé
- Michel Méry as Un employé
- Georges Paulais as Le speaker
- Léon Pauléon as L'inspecteur du fisc
- Marcel Pérès as Bellamy
- Philippe Richard as Cardinal
- Pierre Still as Un employé
- Titys as Le facteur

== Bibliography ==
- Bessy, Maurice & Chirat, Raymond. Histoire du cinéma français: 1951-1955. Pygmalion, 1989.
- Rège, Philippe. Encyclopedia of French Film Directors, Volume 1. Scarecrow Press, 2009.
