= Alex Nalpas =

French film producer

- Born: 4 April 1887; Smyrna, Ottoman Empire
- Died: 15 May 1944 (aged 57); Pau, France
- Occupation: Producer

Alex Nalpas (1887–1944) was a French film producer. He began his career in the early 1920s making short silent films before graduating to feature films. He was at the peak of his activity during the early 1930s following the introduction of sound, producing a number of adaptations of stage comedies. He was the younger brother of producer Louis Nalpas.

== Selected filmography ==
- Parisian Pleasures (1927)
- Princess Mandane (1928)
- The Blaireau Case (1932)
- The Regiment's Champion (1932)
- Tire au flanc (1933)
- L'enfant de ma soeur (1933)
- Bach the Millionaire (1933)
- The Surprises of Divorce (1933)
- The Heir of the Bal Tabarin (1933)
- Maria Chapdelaine (1934)
- Sidonie Panache (1934)
- Debout là-dedans !!! (1935)

== Bibliography ==
- Goble, Alan. The Complete Index to Literary Sources in Film. Walter de Gruyter, 1999.
- Jules-Rosette, Bennetta. Josephine Baker in Art and Life: The Icon and the Image. University of Illinois Press, 2007.
