= The Army Game (film) =

1961 film

- Directed by: Claude de Givray; François Truffaut
- Written by: André Mouëzy-Éon; André Sylvane; François Truffaut; Claude de Givray
- Produced by: François Truffaut; Ignace Morgenstern; Marcel Berbert
- Starring: Christian de Tillière; Ricet Barrier
- Cinematography: Raoul Coutard
- Edited by: Claudine Bouché
- Music by: Ricet Barrier; Jean-Michel Defaye
- Distributed by: Rank
- Release date: 1961
- Running time: 87 minutes
- Country: France
- Language: French

The Army Game (French: Tire-au-flanc 62) is a 1961 French black-and-white comedy about induction and basic training of army conscripts, co-directed by François Truffaut and Claude de Givray.

It recorded admissions of 1,290,967 in France.

== Plot ==
The upper-class Jean, amiable but not very bright, is called up to do his military service. Adrift in this strange world, he finds a helpful fellow-recruit in his family's worldly-wise chauffeur Joseph. But nothing can save him from his mental and physical ineptitude, which infuriates his instructors, amuses his fellow-soldiers and humiliates him. The bright light in his existence is Catherine, the colonel's charming daughter, after whom he yearns. Things look up for him when the barracks puts on the play Tire-au-flanc, in which Joseph has the part of the incompetent young aristocrat, while Jean himself plays the wily servant. His success in the role impresses everybody, and Catherine is happy to go out with the new hero.

== Cast ==
- Christian de Tillière as Jean Lerat de la Grinotière
- Ricet Barrier as Joseph Vidauban
- Jacques Balutin as Corporal Bourrache
- Pierre Maguelon as Petit Bobo
- Serge Korber as Un troupier
- Pierre Fabre as Un troupier
- Jean-Marie Rivière as Un troupier
- Cabu as Un troupier
- Jean-François Adam as Un troupier
- Jean-Claude Brialy as Capitain
- Bernadette Lafont as herself
- Pierre Étaix

== Production ==
Based on a stage play, the story had been filmed by Jean Renoir in 1928 and also by Fernand Rivers in 1950. For its third outing on celluloid, the makers adopted a knowingly light-hearted approach to the material, re-using old visual and verbal gags and inserting humorous homages to earlier works such as Vigo's À propos de Nice and Zinneman's Oklahoma!. There were also cameos for André Mouëzy-Éon, who wrote the original play, for François Truffaut, one of the two directors, and for two stars he used in his films, Bernadette Lafont and Jean-Claude Brialy.
