= Marguerite Deval =

French singer and actress (1866–1955)

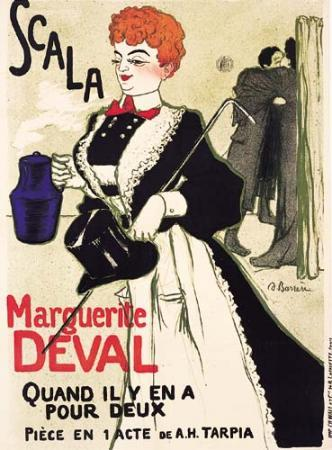
theatrical poster

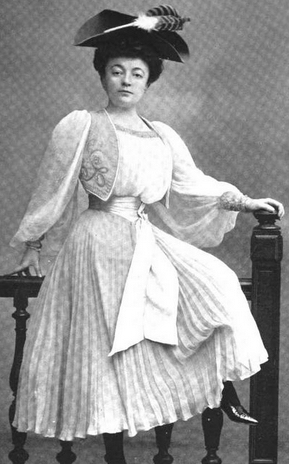
Marguerite Deval, from a 1902 publication

Marguerite Deval (19 September 1866 – 18 December 1955) was a French singer and actress.

Born Marguerite Hippolyte Juliette Brulfer, she was a comedian, opera chanteuse, and actress of stage and film. She was born in Strasbourg and died in Paris.

In 1931, she took the role of Lady Eversharp at the premiere of Reynaldo Hahn's operetta Brummell.

== See also ==
- Yvette Guilbert

== Selected filmography ==
- The Mad Night (1932)
- The Man of the Hour (1937)
- Lady Killer (1937)
- Street Without Joy (1938)
- Women's Prison (1938)
- Nine Bachelors (1939)
- The Duraton Family (1939)
- President Haudecoeur (1940)
- Bécassine (1940)
- The Master Valet (1941)
- The Law of Spring (1942)
- Marie-Martine (1943)
- Mademoiselle Béatrice (1943)
- Traveling Light (1944)
- The Ménard Collection (1944)
- Gringalet (1946)
- As Long as I Live (1946)
- The Spice of Life (1948)
- Eve and the Serpent (1949)
- The Ferret (1950)
- Paris Still Sings (1951)
