= Sidonie Panache =

1934 film

- Directed by: Henry Wulschleger
- Written by: René Pujol; Félix Celval; Henri Jeanson
- Based on: Sidonie Panache by André Mouëzy-Éon and Albert Willemetz
- Produced by: Pierre Gurgo-Salice; Alex Nalpas
- Starring: Florelle; Bach; Alexandre Mihalesco
- Cinematography: Georges Benoît; Scarciafico Hugo
- Edited by: Maurice Serein
- Music by: Joseph Szulc
- Production company: Lux Compagnie Cinématographique de France
- Distributed by: Pathé Consortium Cinéma
- Release date: 19 October 1934
- Running time: 120 minutes
- Country: France
- Language: French

Sidonie Panache is a 1934 French historical comedy film directed by Henry Wulschleger and starring Florelle, Bach and Alexandre Mihalesco. Location shooting took place in Algeria. The film's sets were designed by the art director Marcel Magniez. It was based on an operetta of the same title. It was one of the more popular releases in France that year.

== Synopsis ==
In 1842 during the Conquest of Algeria, Sidonie Panache disguises herself as a Zouave in order to accompany her lover who has been sent out to serve there.

== Cast ==
- Florelle as Sidonie Panache
- Bach as Chabichou
- Monique Bert as Rosalie
- Paul Azaïs as Bourrache
- Alexandre Mihalesco as Salomon
- Jean-Louis Allibert as Le duc d'Aumale
- Antonin Artaud as L'émir Abd-el-Kader
- Paul Clerget as Le maréchal Thomas-Robert Bugeaud
- René Dary as des Ormeaux
- Hugues de Bagratide as Le cheik Mouloud
- Pierre Feuillère as Tiburce
- Madeleine Guitty as La femme d'Augustin
- Tahar Hanache as Un cheik
- Marcelle Lucas as Une grisette
- Charles Montel as Augustin
- Marthe Mussineas Une grisette
- Germaine Sablon as Séraphine

== Bibliography ==
- Bessy, Maurice & Chirat, Raymond. Histoire du cinéma français: 1929-1934. Pygmalion, 1988.
- Crisp, Colin. Genre, Myth and Convention in the French Cinema, 1929-1939. Indiana University Press, 2002.
- Goble, Alan. The Complete Index to Literary Sources in Film. Walter de Gruyter, 1999.
- Rège, Philippe. Encyclopedia of French Film Directors, Volume 1. Scarecrow Press, 2009.
