= Let's Touch Wood =

1933 film

- Directed by: Maurice Champreux
- Written by: Ninon Steinhoff; Louis Vérier; Oscar Wilde (play)
- Produced by: Joseph N. Ermolieff
- Starring: Jeanne Cheirel; Armand Bernard; Lily Zévaco
- Cinematography: Nikolai Toporkoff
- Music by: Ralph Erwin
- Production company: Gaumont-Franco Film-Aubert
- Release date: 24 April 1933
- Running time: 95 minutes
- Country: France
- Language: French

Let's Touch Wood (French: Touchons du bois) is a 1933 French comedy film directed by Maurice Champreux and starring Jeanne Cheirel, Armand Bernard and Lily Zévaco. It is based on the play The Importance of Being Earnest by Oscar Wilde.

== Cast ==
- Jeanne Cheirel as La générale de Saint-Preux
- Armand Bernard as Auguste Chantilly
- Lily Zévaco as Geneviève
- Suzy Pierson as Minouche
- Jules Moy as M. Lebigre
- Roland Armontel as Jacques de Saint-Preux
- Marcelle Barry as Mlle. Frontin
- Suzet Maïs as Arlette
- Suzy Delair as La petite compagne d'amusement
- Carlos Avril

== Bibliography ==
- Crisp, Colin. Genre, Myth and Convention in the French Cinema, 1929-1939. Indiana University Press, 2002.
- Tanitch, Robert. Oscar Wilde on Stage and Screen. Methuen, 1999.
