= Quintuplets in the Boarding School =

1953 film

- Directed by: René Jayet
- Written by: Raymond Caillava; Jean Guitton
- Produced by: Louis Dubois; Paul Temps
- Starring: Valentine Tessier; Armand Bernard; Maurice Escande
- Cinematography: René Colas
- Edited by: Marinette Cadix
- Music by: Jean Yatove
- Production company: Jad Films
- Distributed by: Les Films Fernand Rivers
- Release date: 8 May 1953
- Running time: 89 minutes
- Country: France
- Language: French

Quintuplets in the Boarding School (French: Des quintuplés au pensionnat) is a 1953 French comedy film directed by René Jayet and starring Valentine Tessier, Armand Bernard and Maurice Escande. It was shot at the Billancourt Studios in Paris. The film's sets were designed by the art director Aimé Bazin.

== Cast ==
- Valentine Tessier as La directrice du pensionnat
- Armand Bernard as L'Inspecteur d'Académie
- Maurice Escande as Le comte
- Jeanne Fusier-Gir as Mlle Adélaïde
- Sophie Leclair as Gisèle, une élève du pensionnat
- Jean Brochard as Florentin
- Jean Carmet as Antoine
- Jacques Bernard as Francis
- Philippe Richard as Le maire
- Mona Dol as Mlle Georgette, la surveillante générale
- Liliane Maigné as Cécile, une élève du pensionnat
- Milly Mathis as Victoire
- Dorette Ardenne as Yvonne, un professeur
- Francine Farnell as Blanche
- Suzanne Gabriello as Janine
- Monique Gérard as Françoise
- René Lacourt as Le pharmacien
- Léon Larive as Paillard
- Louis Pérault as Le chauffeur
- Gine Rethy as Mme Florentin
- Suzanne Rissler as La comtesse
- Pierre Still as Le préfet
- Suzy Willy as Mme Paillard

== Bibliography ==
- Faulkner, Sally (ed.) Middlebrow Cinema. Routledge, 2016.
- Rège, Philippe. Encyclopedia of French Film Directors, Volume 1. Scarecrow Press, 2009.
