= The Two Pigeons (film) =

1922 film

- Directed by: André Hugon
- Written by: Alexandre Fontanes
- Starring: Armand Bernard; Germaine Fontanes; Huguette Delacroix
- Production company: Films André Hugon
- Distributed by: Pathé Consortium Cinéma
- Release date: 15 December 1922
- Country: France
- Languages: Silent; French intertitles

The Two Pigeons (French: Les deux pigeons) is a 1922 French silent film directed by André Hugon and starring Armand Bernard, Germaine Fontanes and Huguette Delacroix.

== Cast ==
- Armand Bernard as Le cousin Planchet
- Germaine Fontanes as Maud Réville
- Huguette Delacroix
- René Maupré as Jean Réville
- Ernest Maupain
- Georges Spanover
- Henry Bender as Henri

== Bibliography ==
- Rège, Philippe. Encyclopedia of French Film Directors, Volume 1. Scarecrow Press, 2009.
