= The Master Valet =

1941 film

- Directed by: Paul Mesnier
- Written by: Albert Guyot; Paul Mesnier; Léopold Marchand
- Based on: The Master Valet by Paul Armont and Léopold Marchand
- Produced by: Camille Trachimel
- Starring: Elvire Popesco; Henri Garat; Marguerite Deval
- Cinematography: Georges Clerc
- Edited by: Jean Loubignac
- Music by: Max d'Yresne; Marceau Van Hoorebecke
- Production company: Société de Production et d'Edition Cinématographique
- Distributed by: Compagnie Parisienne de Location de Films
- Release date: 30 October 1941
- Running time: 90 minutes
- Country: France
- Language: French

The Master Valet (French: Le valet maître) is a 1941 French comedy film directed by Paul Mesnier and starring Elvire Popesco, Henri Garat and Marguerite Deval. It was based on the 1938 play of the same title by Paul Armont and Léopold Marchand. The film's sets were designed by the art director Roland Quignon.

== Synopsis ==
Gustave Lorillon, a valet, is a superb player at contract bridge, provoking the jealousy of his master, who dismisses him. However Gustave continues to play as part of a club that is unaware of his lowly background. When they discover he is a servant, they snobbishly reject him, although they come to realise they desperately need his talents. In the process of winning the tournament he also gets together with Antonia, an attractive foreigner also coveted by his ex-employer.

== Cast ==
- Elvire Popesco as Antonia - une effervescente étrangère
- Henri Garat as Gustave Lorillon - le valet de Ravier, imbattable champion de bridge
- Marguerite Deval as Ninon Ravier
- René Génin as Foucard
- Georges Mauloy as Le comte des Bossons
- Alexandre Mihalesco as Émile
- Marianne Brack as Annie
- Andrée Champeaux as Marie
- Paul Demange as Le vendeur de tableaux
- Nina Myral as Agathe
- Georges Bever as Justin
- Georges Saillard as Le président du jockey-club
- Georges Grey as Jean-Louis Crampel
- Roger Karl as Ravier 'de l'Orne' - un champion de bridge
- Léonce Corne as Un membre du club des 'Patineurs'
- Lucien Desagneaux as Un membre du club des 'Patineurs'
- Henri Richard as Le marquis de Lazergues
- Philippe Richard as Castaneix
- Georges Sellier as Un membre du club des 'Patineurs'
- Roger Vincent as Un membre du club des 'Patineurs'
- Yvonne Yma as La cuisinière au bal

== Bibliography ==
- Rège, Philippe. Encyclopedia of French Film Directors, Volume 1. Scarecrow Press, 2009.
- Siclier, Jacques. La France de Pétain et son cinéma. H. Veyrier, 1981.
