= Pierre Gurgo-Salice =

Italian film producer

- Born: 12 August 1894; Casale Monferrato, Piedmont, Italy
- Died: 1 June 1974 (aged 79); Rome, Lazio, Italy
- Occupation: Producer
- Years active: 1934–1968 (film)

Pier Giuseppe Gurgo-Salice (1894–1974), generally credited as Pierre Gurgo-Salice, was an Italian film producer. He was a senior figure at Lux Film, an Italian film production company that specialised in co-productions with France where Lux had a subsidiary. His brother Ermanno Gurgo-Salice headed production in France.

== Selected filmography ==
- Sidonie Panache (1934)
- Little One (1935)
- His Excellency Antonin (1935)
- Captain Fracasse (1943)
- Sowing the Wind (1944)
- Lunegarde (1946)
- Keep an Eye on Amelia (1949)
- The Paris Waltz (1950)
- Rome-Paris-Rome (1951)
- The Lady of the Camellias (1953)
- Operation Magali (1953)
- Queen Margot (1954)
- Theodora, Slave Empress (1954)
- A Certain Monsieur Jo (1958)
- La bonne tisane (1958)
- Carthage in Flames (1960)
- Les mordus de Paris (1965)
- The Sweet Body of Deborah (1968)

== Bibliography ==
- Bermond, Claudio. Riccardo Gualino finanziere e imprenditore: un protagonista dell'economia italiana del Novecento. Centro studi piemontesi, 2005.
- Curti, Roberto. Riccardo Freda: The Life and Works of a Born Filmmaker. McFarland, 2017.
- Gualino, Cesarina. Cesarina Gualino e i suoi amici. Marsilio, 1997.
