= Jean Sinoël =

French actor and singer (1868–1949)

Jean Sinoël (13 August 1868 – 30 August 1949), often known simply as Sinoël, was a French actor and singer.

Born Jean Léonis Blès in Sainte-Terre, Gironde, France, he died in Paris in 1949.

== Selected filmography ==
- Captain Craddock (1931)
- Make a Living (1931)
- Kiss Me (1932)
- To Live Happily (1932)
- Bach the Millionaire (1933)
- Étienne (1933)
- The Illustrious Maurin (1933)
- The Invisible Woman (1933)
- Jeanne (1934)
- Cease Firing (1934)
- Chourinette (1934)
- Night in May (1934)
- Last Hour (1934)
- Tartarin of Tarascon (1934)
- The Princess's Whim (1934)
- Aux portes de Paris (1934)
- The Ideal Woman (1934)
- The Last Billionaire (1934)
- Happy Arenas (1935)
- Beautiful Days (1935)
- Madame Angot's Daughter (1935)
- Little One (1935)
- Honeymoon (1935)
- A Hen on a Wall (1936)
- Donogoo (1936)
- Boulot the Aviator (1937)
- Madelon's Daughter (1937)
- Francis the First (1937)
- The Man from Nowhere (1937)
- The Postmaster's Daughter (1938)
- Gargousse (1938)
- Peace on the Rhine (1938)
- Sirocco (1938)
- The Duraton Family (1939)
- My Aunt the Dictator (1939)
- The Mayor's Dilemma (1939)
- Hopes (1941)
- Caprices (1942)
- Mademoiselle Béatrice (1943)
- The Inevitable Monsieur Dubois (1943)
- Madly in Love (1943)
- White Wings (1943)
- Lucrèce (1943)
- Boule de suif (1945)
- The Bellman (1945)
- That's Not the Way to Die (1946)
- Mystery Trip (1947)
- One Night at the Tabarin (1947)
- Dilemma of Two Angels (1948)
- The Eleven O'Clock Woman (1948)
- Night Round (1949)
