= The Porter from Maxim's (1939 film) =

1939 film

- Directed by: Maurice Cammage
- Written by: Pierre Maudru; Yves Mirande (play); Gustave Quinson (play)
- Starring: Bach; Roger Tréville; Geneviève Callix
- Cinematography: Raymond Agnel; Paul Cotteret; Edouard Meyer
- Music by: Casimir Oberfeld
- Production company: Stella Productions
- Distributed by: Gray-Film
- Release date: 10 November 1939
- Running time: 95 minutes
- Country: France
- Language: French

The Porter from Maxim's (French: Le chasseur de chez Maxim's) is a 1939 French comedy film directed by Maurice Cammage and starring Bach, Roger Tréville and Geneviève Callix. It is based on the 1923 play of the same name which has been made into several film adaptations.

== Cast ==
- Bach as Julien
- Roger Tréville as Le marquis du Vélin
- Geneviève Callix as Totoche
- André Roanne as Monsieur La Giclais
- Germaine Charley as Madame Pauphilat
- Jacqueline Pacaud as Geneviève Pauphilat
- Jean-Pierre Kérien as Octave
- Gaby Basset as Crici
- Marcel Carpentier as Le chanoine
- Georges Bever
- Paul Bonifas
- Lucy Clorival
- Albert Duvaleix as Le patron
- Pierre Feuillère
- Louis Florencie
- Nova Grey
- Germaine Michel
- Rolla Norman
- Félix Oudart
- Noël Roquevert
- Serjius

== Bibliography ==
- Rearick, Charles. Paris Dreams, Paris Memories: The City and Its Mystique. Stanford University Press, 2011.
