= Business Is Business (1942 film) =

1942 film

- Directed by: Jean Dréville
- Written by: Léopold Marchand
- Based on: Business is Business Octave Mirbeau
- Produced by: Edmond Pingrin
- Starring: Charles Vanel; Aimé Clariond; Jacques Baumer
- Cinematography: Nicolas Bourgassoff
- Edited by: André Versein
- Music by: Henri Verdun
- Production company: Les Moulins d'Or
- Distributed by: Éclair-Journal
- Release date: 10 September 1942
- Running time: 82 minutes
- Country: France
- Language: French

Business Is Business (French: Les affaires sont les affaires) is a 1942 French drama film directed by Jean Dréville and starring Charles Vanel, Aimé Clariond and Jacques Baumer. It was shot at the Studios Francois 1er in Paris. The film's sets were designed by the art director René Renoux.

== Cast ==
- Charles Vanel as Isidore Lechat
- Aimé Clariond as Le marquis de Porcellet
- Jacques Baumer as Grugh
- Germaine Charley as Madame Lechat
- Jean Debucourt as Le vicomte de la Fontenelle
- Jean Pâqui as Xavier Lechat
- Lucien Nat as Lucien Garraud
- Henri Nassiet as Dauphin
- Hubert de Malet as Melchior de Porcellet
- Marcel Pérès as Jules
- Henri de Livry as Le maître d'hôtel
- Renée Devillers as Germaine Lechat
- Robert Le Vigan as Phinck

== Bibliography ==
- Moraly, Yehuda. Revolution in Paradise: Veiled Representations of Jewish Characters in the Cinema of Occupied France. Liverpool University Press, 2019.
- Rège, Philippe. Encyclopedia of French Film Directors, Volume 1. Scarecrow Press, 2009.
