= Germaine Charley =

French actress (1887–1959)

- Born: 25 March 1887; Paris, France
- Died: 27 March 1959 (aged 72); Paris, France
- Occupation: Actress
- Years active: 1917–1953 (film)

Germaine Charley (1887–1959) was a French stage and film actress.

== Selected filmography ==
- The Regiment's Champion (1932)
- Bach the Millionaire (1933)
- The Uncle from Peking (1934)
- Honeymoon (1935)
- Barnabé (1938)
- The New Rich (1938)
- Sacred Woods (1939)
- The Porter from Maxim's (1939)
- Business Is Business (1942)
- Mademoiselle Béatrice (1943)
- Her Final Role (1946)
- The Nude Woman (1949)
- Virgile (1953)

== Bibliography ==
- Goble, Alan. The Complete Index to Literary Sources in Film. Walter de Gruyter, 1999.
