= Parisian Pleasures =

1927 film

- Austrian theatrical release poster, as Die Königin von Paris
- Directed by: Joe Francis
- Written by: Joe Francis; Clément Vautel
- Produced by: Alex Nalpas
- Starring: Josephine Baker; André Luguet; Hélène Hallier
- Cinematography: Jimmy Berliet; Maurice Guillemin
- Music by: Taranta-Babu
- Production company: Kino Lorber Films
- Release date: 29 November 1927
- Running time: 103 minutes
- Countries: France; Germany
- Languages: Silent; German intertitles

Parisian Pleasures (French: La revue des revues, originally: Paris qui charme) is a 1927 French-German silent film directed by Joe Francis and starring Josephine Baker, André Luguet and Hélène Hallier. The film focuses on the Parisian nightlife of the time, showing various performances of the Jazz Age, including two by Baker, with the plot taking a backseat. The performances take place within several nightclubs in Montmartre, and feature scantily-clad exotic dancers, showgirls, and acrobats.

== Plot ==
Parisian Pleasures (1927)

Gabrille Derisau is a down-on-her-luck seamstress with a dream of becoming a dance-hall star. She enters a contest aimed at finding the new Cinderella of Parisian nightclubs and ultimately wins. As her star is on the rise, she develops a romantic interest with Georges Barsac, a fellow performer. But as their careers go in different directions, tensions begin to develop in their relationship.

== Notes ==
Although Josephine Baker received top billing, she only appears in two dance segments; accounting for just a few minutes of screen time.

== Cast ==
- Josephine Baker
- André Luguet as Georges Barsac
- Hélène Hallier as Gabrielle Derisau
- Pépa Bonafé
- Erna Carise
- Edmond Castel
- Jeanne de Balzac
- Mme. Dehan
- Gretchikine
- The Hoffman Girls as Themselves
- John Tiller's Folies Girls as Themselves
- Mme. Komakova
- Londonia
- Ludovic
- Lila Nicolska
- Skibinne
- Standford
- Titos
- Henri Varna
- Stanislawa Welska
- Ruth Zackey

== See also ==
- List of early color feature films

== Bibliography ==
- Rège, Philippe. Encyclopedia of French Film Directors, Volume 1. Scarecrow Press, 2009.
