= The Mad Night =

1932 film

- Directed by: Robert Bibal
- Written by: Félix Gandéra; André Mouëzy-Éon (play)
- Produced by: Léon Poirier
- Cinematography: Robert Batton; Georges Million
- Music by: Marcel Pollet
- Production company: Films Léon Poirier
- Release date: 19 April 1932
- Running time: 84 minutes
- Country: France
- Language: French

The Mad Night (French: La folle nuit) is a 1932 French comedy film directed by Robert Bibal.

The film's sets were designed by the art director Robert-Jules Garnier.

== Cast ==
- Suzanne Bianchetti
- Colette Broïdo
- Marguerite Deval as Mme Maclovie
- Max-Georges Lafon
- Guy Parzy

== Bibliography ==
- Crisp, Colin. Genre, Myth and Convention in the French Cinema, 1929-1939. Indiana University Press, 2002.
