= Aimé Bazin =

French art director

- Born: 2 July 1904; Paris, France
- Died: October 5, 1984 (aged 80); France
- Occupation: Art director
- Years active: 1933-1956 (film)

Aimé Bazin (1904-1984) was a French art director. He was educated at the École nationale supérieure des Beaux-Arts before entering the film industry. He worked on more than forty productions during his career.

== Selected filmography ==
- The Red Robe (1933)
- The Uncle from Peking (1934)
- Crime and Punishment (1935)
- Second Bureau (1935)
- In the Service of the Tsar (1936)
- The Mutiny of the Elsinore (1936)
- The Silent Battle (1937)
- The Girls of the Rhône (1938)
- Fort Dolorès (1939)
- The Spirit of Sidi-Brahim (1939)
- Solita de Cordoue (1946)
- Three Investigations (1948)
- Memories Are Not for Sale (1948)
- Mystery in Shanghai (1950)
- The Darling of His Concierge (1951)
- Moumou (1951)
- Operation Magali (1953)
- Quintuplets in the Boarding School (1953)
- Suspicion (1956)
- Zaza (1956)

== Bibliography ==
- Andrews, Dudley. Mists of Regret: Culture and Sensibility in Classic French Film. Princeton University Press, 1995.
