= President Haudecoeur =

1940 film

- Directed by: Jean Dréville
- Written by: Roger Ferdinand (play and screenplay)
- Starring: Harry Baur; Betty Stockfeld; Marguerite Deval
- Cinematography: René Gaveau
- Edited by: Raymond Leboursier
- Music by: Henri Forterre
- Production company: E.D.I.C.
- Distributed by: Films Marcel Pagnol
- Release date: 11 April 1940
- Running time: 110 minutes
- Country: France
- Language: French

President Haudecoeur (French: Le président Haudecoeur) is a 1940 French comedy film directed by Jean Dréville and starring Harry Baur, Betty Stockfeld and Marguerite Deval. It was shot at the Marseille Studios of Marcel Pagnol in Southern France. The film's sets were designed by the art director Roland Quignon.

It is an adaptation of the play by Roger Ferdinand.

== Synopsis ==
A magistrate in Aix-en-Provence rules his family tyrannically and forbids his son to marry the girl he loves as he wants him to marry a wealthy heiress. However, his ordered life is thrown upside down when he encounters a charming Canadian lady.

== Cast ==
- Harry Baur as President Haudecoeur
- Betty Stockfeld as Mrs. Betty Brown
- Marguerite Deval as Mme Bergas-Larue
- Robert Pizani as Abbot Margot
- Cecil Grane as Pierre Haudecoeur
- Georges Chamarat as Cousin Alexis
- Jean Témerson as Capet
- André Numès Fils as Brouillon
- Marcel Maupi as the gardener
- Sonia Gobar as Antoinette
- Jeanne Provost as Angéline Haudecoeur

== Legacy ==
The film was screened in 2012 at the Cinémathèque française, where the film had been restored.

== Bibliography ==
- Rège, Philippe. Encyclopedia of French Film Directors, Volume 1. Scarecrow Press, 2009.
