= Jean-Louis Allibert =

French actor (1897–1979)

- Born: 14 December 1897; Paris, France
- Died: 16 December 1979 (aged 82); Paris, France
- Other name: Louis Allibert
- Occupation: Actor
- Years active: 1924–1979

Jean-Louis Allibert (1897–1979) was a French film and television actor. He is sometimes also known as Louis Allibert.

== Selected filmography ==
- Paris (1924)
- Monte Carlo (1925)
- The Painter and His Model (1925)
- Saint Joan the Maid (1929)
- Paris by Night (1930)
- Le Million (1931)
- Alone (1931)
- The Three Musketeers (1932)
- The Blaireau Case (1932)
- Youth (1933)
- Sidonie Panache (1934)
- Light Cavalry (1935)
- The Path of Honour (1939)
- Prince Charming (1942)
- At Your Command, Madame (1942)
- Shot in the Night (1943)
- My Last Mistress (1943)
- The Queen's Necklace (1946)
- Criminal Brigade (1947)
- Passion for Life (1949)
- Tomorrow We Get Divorced (1951)

== Bibliography ==
- Gmür, Leonhard. Rex Ingram: Hollywood's Rebel of the Silver Screen. Impressum, 2013.
