= Gargousse =

1938 film

- Directed by: Henry Wulschleger
- Written by: Bach; Jean-Pierre Feydeau; Jean Rioux; Henry Wulschleger
- Produced by: Joseph Bercholz; Albert Dodrumez
- Starring: Bach; Saturnin Fabre; Jeanne Fusier-Gir
- Cinematography: René Colas
- Music by: Georges Van Parys
- Production company: Union des Distributeurs Indépendants
- Release date: 27 July 1938
- Running time: 108 minutes
- Country: France
- Language: French

Gargousse is a 1938 French comedy film directed by Henry Wulschleger and starring Bach, Saturnin Fabre and Jeanne Fusier-Gir.

The film's art direction was by Henri Ménessier.

== Cast ==
- Bach as Gargousse
- Saturnin Fabre as Lebrennois, le maire
- Jeanne Fusier-Gir as Anaïs Lebrennois
- Sinoël as Le facteur
- Max Fontal as Allain
- Georges Montel as Le garde-champêtre
- Louis Lorsy as Rousseau
- Paul Ollivier as Le docteur Larmoyer
- Marie-Therese Fleury as Antoinette
- Henri Pfeifer as L'Abricot
- Milly Mathis as La buraliste
- Suzanne Dehelly as Zozo
- Lucien Callamand as Un gendarme
- Maurice Schutz

== Bibliography ==
- Alfred Krautz. International directory of cinematographers set- and costume designers in film. Saur, 1983.
