= Bach the Detective =

1936 film

- Directed by: René Pujol
- Written by: Jacques Daniel-Norman; André Mouëzy-Éon
- Starring: Bach; Ginette Leclerc; Paul Bernard
- Cinematography: Simon Hugo
- Music by: Vincent Scotto; Jean Yatove
- Production company: BBB Films
- Release date: 20 November 1936
- Running time: 89 minutes
- Country: France
- Language: French

Bach the Detective (French: Bach détective) is a 1936 French comedy film directed by René Pujol and starring Bach, Ginette Leclerc and Paul Bernard. The film's sets were designed by the art director Emile Duquesne.

== Synopsis ==
Narcisse works as a doorman for a firm of jewellers, but dreams of becoming a private detective. Het gets his break when he is employed by a detective agency and is able to clear the nephew of his former boss who has been wrongly accused of theft.

== Cast ==
- Bach as Narcisse
- Paul Bernard as André
- Monique Bert as Mag
- Ginette Gaubert as Olga Worskaïa
- Louis Florencie as Baudry
- Armand Lurville as Lesueur
- Jacques Dumesnil as Stefani
- Ginette Leclerc as Zita
- Georges Prieur as Durandel
- Georges Morton as Olive
- Edmond Castel as M. Estrade
- Simone d'Arche as Dora
- Jules Moy as L'usurier
- Alexandre Mihalesco as L'extra
- Andrée Champeaux as L'amie du baron
- Rachel Devirys as La maîtresse de maison
- Yvonne Yma as Madame Estrade
- Georges Tréville as Le baron
- Jean Brochard as Le voyageur indisposé
- Ky Duyen as Le complice de Stefani
- Myno Burney as Vendeuse de la bijouterie
- Gabriel Farguette as Le fils de l'aubergiste
- René Novan as Tony
- Marcel Loche as Le domestique de Dora
- Albert Brouett as Un élève chez Lesueur
- Albert Broquin as Le distributeur de prospectus
- Paul Demange as M. Dubois
- Albert Malbert as Le gendarme
- Léon Larive as L'aubergiste

== Bibliography ==
- Dayna Oscherwitz & MaryEllen Higgins. The A to Z of French Cinema. Scarecrow Press, 2009.
