= Janine Merrey =

French film actress

- Occupation: Actress
- Years active: 1924–1944 (film)

Janine Merrey was a French film actress. She appeared in more than thirty films.

== Selected filmography ==
- Love Songs (1930)
- The Regiment's Champion (1932)
- If You Wish It (1932)
- A Father Without Knowing It (1932)
- The Uncle from Peking (1934)
- One Night's Secret (1934)
- Honeymoon (1935)
- Little One (1935)
- Durand Jewellers (1938)
- Princess Tarakanova (1938)
- His Uncle from Normandy (1939)
- Death No Longer Awaits (1944)

== Bibliography ==
- Goble, Alan. The Complete Index to Literary Sources in Film. Walter de Gruyter, 1999.
