= Bach (actor) =

French actor and singer

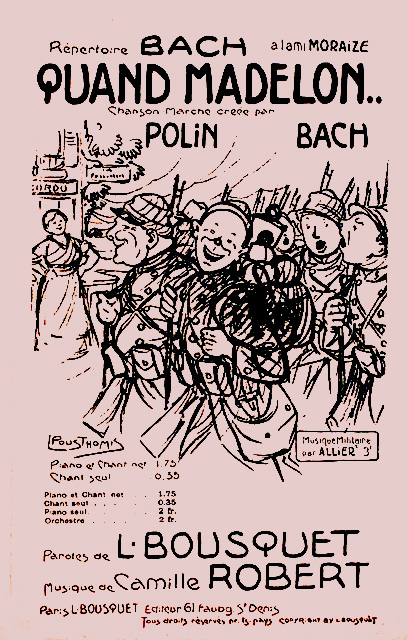
- Born: 9 November 1882; Fontanil-Cornillon, Isère, France
- Died: 23 November 1953 (aged 71); Nogent-le-Rotrou, Eure-et-Loir, France
- Other name: Charles-Joseph Pasquier
- Occupations: Actor, singer
- Years active: 1911–1949 (film)

Charles-Joseph Pasquier (9 November 1882 – 23 November 1953), known by his stage name of Bach, was a French actor, singer and music hall performer.

== Selected filmography ==
- The Regiment's Champion (1932)
- The Blaireau Case (1932)
- Bach the Millionaire (1933)
- Sidonie Panache (1934)
- Little One (1935)
- Bach the Detective (1936)
- Gargousse (1938)
- My Priest Among the Rich (1938)
- The Porter from Maxim's (1939)
- The Martyr of Bougival (1949)

== Bibliography ==
- Crisp, Colin. French Cinema—A Critical Filmography: Volume 1, 1929–1939. Indiana University Press, 2015.
