= The Regiment's Champion =

1932 film

- Directed by: Henry Wulschleger
- Written by: Fernand Beissier (play); Félix Celval (play); Jacques Bousquet; Henry Wulschleger
- Produced by: Alex Nalpas
- Starring: Bach; Charles Montel; Georges Tréville
- Cinematography: Maurice Guillemin
- Music by: Raymond Berner; Casimir Oberfeld; Géo Sundy
- Production company: Les Films Alex Nalpas
- Release date: 9 September 1932
- Running time: 96 minutes
- Country: France
- Language: French

The Regiment's Champion (French: Le champion du régiment) is a 1932 French comedy film directed by Henry Wulschleger and starring Bach, Charles Montel and Georges Tréville.

== Cast ==
- Bach as L'abbé Sourire
- Charles Montel as Piganol
- Georges Tréville as Baron de Villetaneuse
- George Rigaud as André de Villetaneuse
- Germaine Charleyas La baronne de Villetaneuse
- Janine Merrey as Lulu
- Josette Day as Josette
- Raymond Aimos as Le capitaine Tiroir
- Charles Barrois as Le capitaine
- Albert Broquin as Le capitaine Torche
- Renée Dennsy as L'amie
- Georges Despaux as L'adjudant
- Paulette Dubost
- Jacques Henley as Le colonel
- Odette Josylla as La midinette
- Henri Lareins as Baptiste
- Charles Mantelet
- Marthe Mussine as Rosette - la dactylo
- Georges Péclet as Le bombardier Raid

== Bibliography ==
- Guy Hennebelle, Mouny Berrah & Benjamin Stora. La guerre d'Algérie à l'écran. Corlet, 1997.
