= Étienne (film) =

1933 film

L'Étienne
- Directed by: Jean Tarride
- Written by: Jean Bertin; Jacques Deval (play)
- Starring: Jacques Baumer; Marthe Régnier
- Release dates: 15 December 1933 (France); 8 December 1940 (USA)
- Running time: 105 minutes
- Country: France
- Language: French

L'Étienne English: Steven, is a French comedy drama film from 1933, directed by Jean Tarride, written by Jean Bertin, starring Jacques Baumer.

== Cast ==
- Jacques Baumer: Fernand Lebarmecide
- Marthe Régnier: Simone Lebarmecide
- Véra Markels: Vassia Poustiano
- Jean Forest: Etienne
- Maximilienne: Aunt Valérie
- Sinoël: Uncle Emile
- Junie Astor: Henriette
- Paul Pauley: César Poustiano
- Robert Moor: the director
- Sophie Duval: Juliette
- Jean Marais (uncredited)
