= Wedding Night (1950 film) =

1950 film

- Directed by: René Jayet
- Written by: Robert Bibal; Robert Rocca
- Based on: Une nuit de noces by Albert Barré and Henri Kéroul
- Produced by: Georges Sénamaud
- Starring: Martine Carol; Jean Parédès; Mona Goya
- Cinematography: Charles Bauer
- Edited by: Madeleine Gug
- Production company: Paral Films
- Distributed by: Societe d'Edition et de Location de Films
- Release date: 8 February 1950
- Running time: 85 minutes
- Country: France
- Language: French

Wedding Night (French: Une nuit de noces) is a 1950 French comedy film directed by René Jayet and starring Martine Carol, Jean Parédès and Mona Goya. The film's sets were designed by the art director Louis Le Barbenchon. It is based on the play of the same title by Albert Barré and Henri Kéroul, previously adapted into a 1920 silent film Wedding Night and a 1935 sound film Wedding Night.

== Cast ==
- Martine Carol as Sidonie de Valpurgis
- Jean Parédès as Gaston
- Mona Goya as Valentine
- Félix Oudart as Saint-Moutier
- Nina Myral as Présidente
- Alice Tissot as Mme Portal
- Dorette Ardenne as Claudine
- Marcel Arnal as Valentin
- Paul Barré as Henri
- Geno Ferny as M. Portal
- Léon Larive as Directeur de l'hôtel
- Albert Michel as L'inspecteur
- Jean-Pierre Mocky as Le garçon d'honneur
- Philippe Richard as Président
- Guy Rivière as Adhémar
- Micheline Roland as Simone

== Bibliography ==
- Goble, Alan. The Complete Index to Literary Sources in Film. Walter de Gruyter, 1999.
- Rège, Philippe. Encyclopedia of French Film Directors, Volume 1. Scarecrow Press, 2009.
