= Honeymoon (1935 film) =

1935 film

- Directed by: Pierre-Jean Ducis
- Written by: René Pujol
- Starring: Albert Préjean; Janine Merrey; Félix Oudart
- Cinematography: André Bac; Scarciafico Hugo
- Music by: Casimir Oberfeld
- Production company: G.B. Films
- Distributed by: Lux Compagnie Cinématographique de France
- Release date: 13 December 1935
- Running time: 85 minutes
- Country: France
- Language: French

Honeymoon (French: Lune de miel) is a 1935 French comedy film directed by Pierre-Jean Ducis and starring Albert Préjean, Janine Merrey and Félix Oudart.

== Synopsis ==
After returning from their honeymoon, newlyweds Jacques and Yvonne learn that their respective parents have been misleading them and the money they expected to live off does not exist. Instead they will have to go out to work.

== Cast ==
- Albert Préjean as Jacques Tracin
- Janine Merrey as Yvonne
- Félix Oudart as Monsieur Philippon
- Fernand Charpin as Monsieur Grivette
- Milly Mathis as Madame Philippon
- Germaine Charley as Madame Drapier
- Raymond Cordy as Le portier
- Jean Sinoël as Fritet
- Alexandre Mihalesco as Lévy

== Bibliography ==
- Bessy, Maurice & Chirat, Raymond. Histoire du cinéma français: 1935-1939. Pygmalion, 1986.
- Crisp, Colin. Genre, Myth and Convention in the French Cinema, 1929-1939. Indiana University Press, 2002.
- Rège, Philippe. Encyclopedia of French Film Directors, Volume 1. Scarecrow Press, 2009.
