= The Beauty from Nivernais =

1924 film directed by Jean Epstein

- Directed by: Jean Epstein
- Based on: "La belle Nivernaise" by Alphonse Daudet
- Starring: Blanche Montel; Marie Lacroix
- Release date: 25 January 1924
- Running time: 69 minutes
- Country: France

The Beauty from Nivernais (1924) by Jean Epstein

The Beauty from Nivernais (French: La Belle Nivernaise) is a 1924 French silent drama film directed by Jean Epstein. It is based on the short story with the same title by Alphonse Daudet.

== Cast ==
- Blanche Montel – Clara Louveau
- Marie Lacroix – Mme. Louveau
- Maurice Touzé – Victor Maugendré
- Pierre Hot – M. Louveau
- Max Bonnet – L'equipage
- Jean-David Évremond – Maugendré
