= Street Without Joy (film) =

- Directed by: André Hugon
- Written by: Hugo Bettauer (novel); Georges Fagot; André Hugon
- Produced by: André Hugon
- Starring: Dita Parlo; Albert Préjean; Marguerite Deval
- Cinematography: Marc Bujard; Tahar Hanache; Michel Rocca
- Music by: Georges Auric; André Hugon; Georges Koger; Vincent Scotto
- Production company: Films André Hugon
- Distributed by: Les Films Vog
- Release date: 13 April 1938
- Running time: 87 minutes
- Country: France
- Language: French

Street Without Joy (French: La rue sans joie) is a 1938 French drama film directed by André Hugon and starring Dita Parlo, Albert Préjean and Marguerite Deval. It is a remake of the 1925 German film The Joyless Street directed by Georg Wilhelm Pabst.

== Synopsis ==
A young woman tries to financially support her family amidst the poverty of Paris.

== Cast ==
- Dita Parlo as Jeanne de Romer
- Albert Préjean as Jean Dumas
- Marguerite Deval as Le greffier
- Line Noro as Marie Leichner
- Valéry Inkijinoff as Louis Stinner
- Pierre Alcover as Monsieur Antoine
- Henri Bosc as L'avocat de Stinner
- Fréhel as Henriette
- Jean Périer as Le grand-père
- Charlotte Barbier-Krauss as La mère de Jeanne
- Émile Drain as Le président
- Mila Parély as Léa Level
- Jean d'Yd as L'avocat général
- Janine Guise as La détective
- Jean Mercure as Le petit pâtissier
- Elisa Ruis as Régine Rozès
- Guy Rapp as Inspecteur Varnier
- Claude Roy as Le petit frère de Jeanne
- Francine Dartois as La soeur de Jeanne
- Paul Pauley as Monsieur Woss

== Bibliography ==
- Crisp, Colin. French Cinema—A Critical Filmography: Volume 1, 1929-1939. Indiana University Press, 2015.
