= Casimir Oberfeld =

French composer

Kazimierz Oberfeld
- Born: 16 November 1903; Lowicz, Vistula Land, Russian Empire
- Died: 23 or 24 January 1945 (aged 41) near train station Loslau
- Other name: Kazimierz Oberfeld
- Occupation: Composer
- Years active: 1930–1940 (film)

Casimir Oberfeld (16 November 1903 – January 1945), also spelled Kazimierz Oberfeld, was a Polish-born French composer. He worked on many film scores and also wrote popular songs of the 1920s and 1930s. Following France's invasion by Germany in 1940 during the Second World War, as a Jew Oberfeld faced increasing persecution. Having taken shelter in Italian-occupied Nice he was arrested when the area was taken over by the Germans. He was sent to Auschwitz. He was murdered in January 1945 in the Death march from Auschwitz to Loslau (in the train near Loslau).

== Career ==
The music of the patriotic song of Nazi-collaborationist Vichy France "Maréchal, nous voilà !", while credited to André Montagnard and Charles Courtioux, was in fact plagiarised from a work by Oberfeld called "La Margoton du bataillon."

== Selected filmography ==
- The Sweetness of Loving (1930)
- The Man in Evening Clothes (1931)
- The Triangle of Fire (1932)
- Antoinette (1932)
- The Regiment's Champion (1932)
- The Blaireau Case (1932)
- The Porter from Maxim's (1933)
- The Uncle from Peking (1934)
- The Fakir of the Grand Hotel (1934)
- Honeymoon (1935)
- Ferdinand the Roisterer (1935)
- The Squadron's Baby (1935)
- The Pont-Biquet Family (1935)
- Rigolboche (1936)
- A Legionnaire (1936)
- You Can't Fool Antoinette (1936)
- Excursion Train (1936)
- Street of Shadows (1937)
- The Beauty of Montparnasse (1937)
- Heartbeat (1938)
- Barnabé (1938)
- Paid Holidays (1938)
- The Two Schemers (1938)
- The Tamer (1938)
- Tricoche and Cacolet (1938)
- The Porter from Maxim's (1939)
- The Five Cents of Lavarede (1939)
- Monsieur Hector (1940)

== Bibliography ==
- Mould, Michael. The Routledge Dictionary of Cultural References in Modern French. Taylor & Francis, 2011.
