= The Painter and His Model (1925 film) =

1925 film

- Soviet poster
- Directed by: Jean Manoussi
- Written by: Jean Manoussi
- Produced by: Paul Ebner; Maxim Galitzenstein
- Starring: Madeleine Erickson; Léon Mathot; Ginette Maddie
- Cinematography: Louis Chaix; Willy Gaebel; Otto Tober
- Production companies: Maxim-Film; Les Films Marcel Vandal et Charles Delac
- Distributed by: UFA
- Release date: 24 April 1925
- Countries: France; Germany
- Languages: Silent; German intertitles

The Painter and His Model (German: Der Maler und sein Modell, French: Le mirage de Paris) is a 1925 French-German silent film directed by Jean Manoussi and starring Madeleine Erickson, Léon Mathot and Ginette Maddie.

The film's sets were designed by the art director Robert Neppach. Location shooting took place around Paris including at the Eiffel Tower and Austerlitz Station.

== Cast ==
- Madeleine Erickson as Frau Bonard
- Léon Mathot as Charles Bonard
- Ginette Maddie as Mariette
- Genevieve Poirier as Marvelle
- Jean-Louis Allibert as Vincent

== Bibliography ==
- Alfred Krautz. International directory of cinematographers, set- and costume designers in film, Volume 4. Saur, 1984.
