= The Blaireau Case (1932 film) =

1932 film

- Directed by: Henry Wulschleger
- Written by: Alphonse Allais (novel); Max Dianville; André Mouëzy-Éon
- Produced by: Alex Nalpas
- Starring: Bach; Alice Tissot; Charles Montel
- Cinematography: René Guichard; Maurice Guillemin
- Edited by: Marcel Cravenne; Yvonne Martin; Marguerite Renoir
- Music by: Casimir Oberfeld
- Production company: Les Films Alex Nalpas
- Distributed by: Ciné Sélection
- Release date: 11 March 1932
- Running time: 100 minutes
- Country: France
- Language: French

The Blaireau Case (French:L'affaire Blaireau) is a 1932 French comedy drama film directed by Henry Wulschleger and starring Bach, Alice Tissot and Charles Montel.

== Cast ==
- Bach as Blaireau
- Alice Tissot as Mademoiselle de Hautperthuis
- Charles Montel as Taupin
- Renée Passeur as Mademoiselle de Charville
- Pierre Juvenet as Le maire
- Georges Tréville as Le baron de Hautperthuis
- Jean-Louis Allibert as Maître Guilloche
- Jean Fabert
- Albert Broquin
- Édouard Hardoux
- Georges Despaux
- Achille Defrenne
- Roger Gaillard
- Émile Saint-Ober
- Marcel Lesieur
- Paul Franceschi
- J.P. Martin
- Blanche Montel

== See also ==
- The Blaireau Case (1923)
- Neither Seen Nor Recognized (1958)

== Bibliography ==
- Crisp, Colin. French Cinema—A Critical Filmography: Volume 1, 1929–1939. Indiana University Press, 2015.
