= Durand Jewellers =

1938 film

- Directed by: Jean Stelli
- Written by: Léopold Marchand
- Based on: Durand Jewellers by Léopold Marchand
- Produced by: François Campaux
- Starring: Blanche Montel; Jacques Baumer; Monique Rolland
- Cinematography: Jean Bachelet
- Edited by: Maurice Juven]
- Music by: Lionel Cazaux; Pierre Guillermin
- Production company: Productions François Campaux
- Distributed by: Filmsonor Marceau
- Release date: 6 July 1938
- Running time: 87 minutes
- Country: France
- Language: French

Durand Jewellers (French: Durand bijoutier) is a 1938 French comedy film directed by Jean Stelli and starring Blanche Montel, Jacques Baumer and Monique Rolland. The screenplay was written by Léopold Marchand, adapted from his play of the same name. The film's sets were designed by the art directors Lucien Aguettand and Raymond Gabutti.

== Synopsis ==
The jeweller Monsieur Durand now finds himself unhappily married and he takes a mistress. However he finds her so tricky that he returns to his wife.

== Cast ==
- Blanche Montel as Madame Durand
- Jacques Baumer as Monsieur Durand
- Jean Wall as Tichmeyer
- Monique Rolland as Jessie
- Janine Merrey as Madame Sorbier
- Maurice Bénard as Monsieur Sorbier
- Jean Marconi as Le gigolo
- Suzanne Talba as Mademoiselle Bichon
- Max Révol as La barman
- Yo Maurel as Louise

== Bibliography ==
- Goble, Alan. The Complete Index to Literary Sources in Film. Walter de Gruyter, 1999.
- Rège, Philippe. Encyclopedia of French Film Directors, Volume 1. Scarecrow Press, 2009.
