= Princess Mandane =

1928 film

- Directed by: Germaine Dulac
- Written by: Germaine Dulac
- Based on: L'Oublié by Pierre Benoit
- Produced by: Alex Nalpas
- Starring: Edmonde Guy; Mona Goya
- Cinematography: Lucien Bellavoine; Paul Guichard
- Production company: Les Films Alex Nalpas
- Distributed by: Les Films Louis Aubert
- Release date: 23 November 1928
- Running time: 74 minutes
- Country: France
- Languages: Silent; French intertitles

Princess Mandane (French: Princesse Mandane) is a 1928 French silent adventure film directed by Germaine Dulac and starring Edmonde Guy and Mona Goya. It is based on the 1922 novel L'Oublié by Pierre Benoit. The film's sets were designed by the art director César Silvagni.

== Synopsis ==
Étienne is engaged to Anna who works as a secretary in the same factory as him. However, he falls asleep and dreams of going to a foreign land reigned over by princess Mandane who he enjoys a romance and a series of adventures with.

== Cast ==
- Edmonde Guy as Mandane
- Ernst Van Duren as Étienne Pindère
- Jacques Arnna as Gerys-Kahn
- Mona Goya as Simoun
- Yvonne Legeay
- Paul Lorbert
- Valenti Colino as Azime Electropoulos
- Gérard de Wibo as Michel Voraguine
- Christian Gérard
- Brindusa Grozavescu as Lily de Thorigny
- Sylvie Mai as Anna

== Bibliography ==
- Goble, Alan. The Complete Index to Literary Sources in Film. Walter de Gruyter, 1999.
- Graf, Alexander & Scheunemann, Dietrich. Avant-garde Film. Rodopi, 2007.
- Powrie, Phil & Rebillard, Éric. Pierre Batcheff and stardom in 1920s French cinema. Edinburgh University Press, 2009
