= Bach the Millionaire =

1933 film

- Directed by: Henry Wulschleger
- Written by: Louis Bénières (play); Henri Jeanson
- Produced by: Alex Nalpas
- Starring: Bach; Georges Tréville; Germaine Charley
- Cinematography: Henri Gondois; René Guichard; Simon Hugo
- Music by: Vincent Scotto; Géo Sundy
- Production company: Les Films Alex Nalpas
- Distributed by: Pathé Consortium Cinéma
- Release date: 22 December 1933
- Running time: 97 minutes
- Country: France
- Language: French

Bach the Millionaire (French: Bach millionnaire) is a 1933 French comedy film directed by Henry Wulschleger and starring Bach, Georges Tréville and Germaine Charley.

== Synopsis ==
A workmen from a humble background of illegitimate parentage unexpectedly inherits a fortune. This causes great resentment from his distant relations, who had anticipated the money themselves, as well as several attempts to seduce or trick the money out of him.

== Cast ==
- Bach as Papillon
- Georges Tréville as M. Vérillac
- Germaine Charley as Madame Vérillac
- Roger Tréville as Le marquis de Sandray
- Simone Héliard as Jeanine
- Charles Montel as Jules
- Sinoël as Le notaire
- Jean-François Martial as Pernu
- Germaine Aussey as Louise de Sandray
- Albert Broquin as Le garde chasse
- Suzanne Micheline as Balbine
- Le Petit Patachou as Le petit Totor

== Bibliography ==
- Crisp, Colin. French Cinema—A Critical Filmography: Volume 1, 1929–1939. Indiana University Press, 2015.
