= Moumou =

1951 film

- Directed by: René Jayet
- Written by: Jean de Letraz
- Based on: Moumou by Jean de Letraz
- Produced by: Louis Dubois; René Jayet
- Starring: Robert Murzeau; Nathalie Nattier; Jeannette Batti
- Cinematography: Charles Bauer
- Edited by: Marinette Cadix
- Music by: Jean Yatove
- Production company: Jad Films
- Distributed by: Héraut Film
- Release date: 26 October 1951
- Running time: 102 minutes
- Country: France
- Language: French

Moumou is a 1951 French comedy film directed by René Jayet and starring Robert Murzeau, Nathalie Nattier and Jeannette Batti. It was adapted by Jean de Letraz from his own 1944 play of the same title.

The film's sets were designed by the art director Aimé Bazin.

== Cast ==
- Robert Murzeau as Léonard Jolijoli
- Nathalie Nattier as Brigitte Latouche
- Jeannette Batti as Claudine
- Pierre-Louis as Armand Chauvinet
- Raymond Bussières as Jules Latouche
- Annette Poivre as Gisèle Chauvinet
- André Gabriello as Commissaire Germain
- Georgette Anys as La masseuse
- René Lacourt as L'habitué

== Bibliography ==
- Rège, Philippe. Encyclopedia of French Film Directors, Volume 1. Scarecrow Press, 2009.
