= Alone (1931 French film) =

1931 film by Henri Diamant-Berger

- Directed by: Henri Diamant-Berger
- Written by: Jean Barreyre; Gab Sorrère
- Starring: Marie-Louise Damien; Henri Rollan; Ginette Maddie
- Cinematography: Henri Gondois
- Music by: Lionel Cazaux; Jean Lenoir
- Production company: Erka-Prodisco
- Distributed by: Erka-Prodisco
- Release date: 13 February 1931
- Running time: 79 minutes
- Country: France
- Language: French

Alone (French: Sola) is a 1931 French drama film directed by Henri Diamant-Berger and starring Marie-Louise Damien, Henri Rollan and Ginette Maddie. A cabaret singer is stranded in Singapore, struggling to raise the funds for her passage back to France. The film is still extant, unlike a number of productions of the era.

== Cast ==
- Marie-Louise Damien as Sola
- Henri Rollan as Jeff
- Ginette Maddie as Marianne
- Jean-Louis Allibert as Yvon
- Marguerite Moreno as Ellane
- Nadine Picard as Nadia
- Marcel Vallée as Célestin
- Pierre Moreno as Auguste
- Habib Benglia as L'Hindou
- Henri Lévêque as Albert
- Louis Merlac as Le docteur
- Pierre Larquey as Le comandant
- Jean Robert as Alex

== Bibliography ==
- Arthur Knight & Pamela Robertson Wojcik. Soundtrack Available: Essays on Film and Popular Music. Duke University Press, 3 December 2001.
