= Armand Bernard =

French comic actor and composer

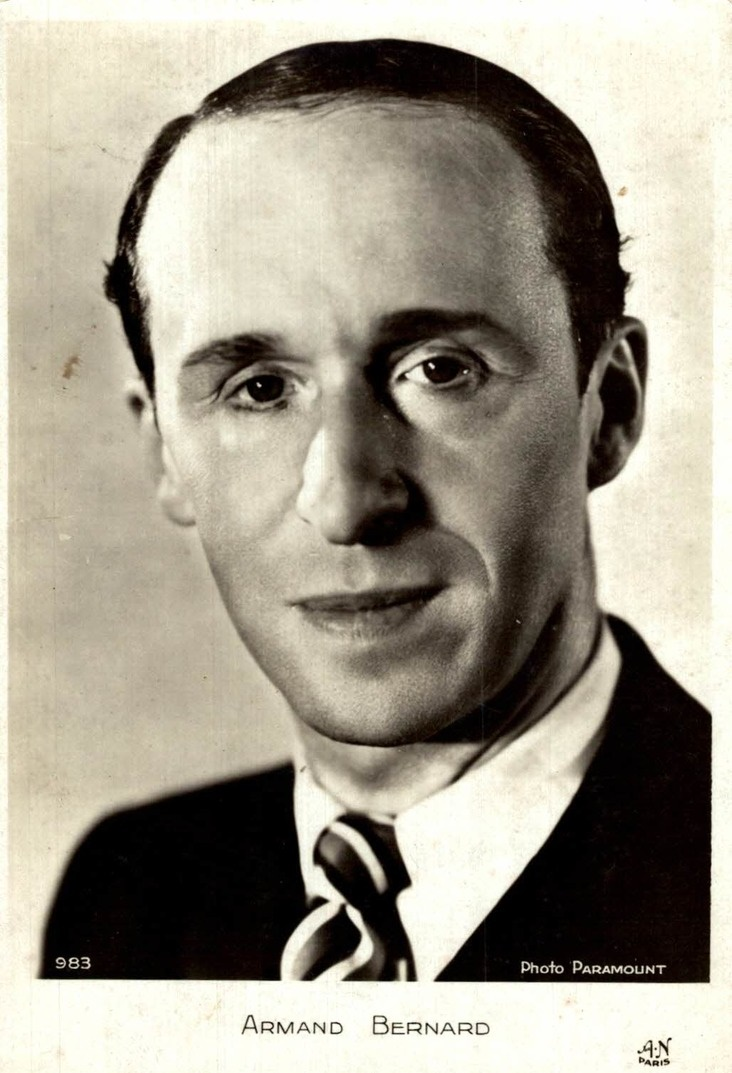
- Bernard c.1930
- Born: Armand Joseph Bernard; 21 March 1893; Bois-Colombes, France
- Died: 13 June 1968 (aged 75); Paris, France
- Resting place: Asnières-sur-Seine
- Occupations: Actor, composer
- Years active: 1914–1964

Armand Bernard (born Armand Joseph Bernard; 21 March 1893 – 13 June 1968) was a French comic actor and composer known mainly for his prolific work in film.

== Selected filmography ==
- Le traitement du hoquet (1918)
- The Little Cafe (1919) - Bouzin
- Les Trois Mousquetaires (1921, Short) - Planchet
- The Black Diamond (1922) - Gottfried
- The Two Pigeons (1922) - Le cousin Planchet
- Vingt ans après (1922) - Planchet
- L'homme inusable (1923) - Planchet - un jeune désespéré
- Décadence et grandeur (1923) - Planchet
- My Aunt from Honfleur (1923) - Armand Berthier
- À la gare (1924) - Mumudec
- Mimi Pinson (1924) - Coline
- Miracle of the Wolves (1924) - Bische
- Un fil à la patte (1925) - Armand de Bois d'Enghien
- L'éveilleur d'instincts (1925)
- Napoleon (1927) - Jean-Jean (uncredited)
- Rue de la paix (1927) - Abramson
- The Chess Player (1927) - Roubenko
- Education of a Prince (1927) - Le comte de Ronceval
- Paris by Night (1930) - Cramoisi
- La place est bonne! (1930, Short) - M Pavillon
- Eau, gaz et amour à tous les étages (1930, Short) - Le pompier de service
- Love Songs (1930)
- Le Million (1931) - Le chef d'orchestre
- The Typist (1931) - Jules Fanfarel
- Fra Diavolo (1931) - Scaramanzia
- Tout s'arrange (1931) - Robert
- Calais-Dover (1931) - Jean
- Le congrès s'amuse (1931) - Bibikoff
- Les monts en flammes (1931) - Le soldat autrichien
- La femme de mes rêves (1931) - Achaz
- Général, à vos ordres (1931)
- Ma tante d'Honfleur (1931)
- A Night at a Honeymoon (1931)
- The Woman Dressed As a Man (1932) - M. Gray
- Tumultes (1932) - Le bègue
- The Miracle Child (1932) - Lescalopier
- Quick (1932) - Lademann, Quick's manager
- Tu m'oublieras (1932) - Isidore
- If You Wish It (1932) - Jérôme
- Monsieur de Pourceaugnac (1932) - Monsieur de Pourceaugnac
- Chassé-croisé (1932)
- My Dream Woman (1932) - Émile
- Le petit Babouin (1932) - Babouin
- Antoinette (1932)
- Let's Touch Wood (1933) - Auguste Chantilly
- Les vingt-huit jours de Clairette (1933) - Michonnet
- The Merry Monarch (1933) - Taxis
- The Adventures of King Pausole (1933, German) - Texis
- The Adventures of King Pausole (1933, French) - Texis
- La margoton du bataillon (1933) - Désiré Chopin
- The Fakir of the Grand Hotel (1934) - Le professeur Demonio
- The Princess's Whim (1934) - Barnabé
- Dactylo se marie (1934) - Jules Fanfarel
- Chansons de Paris (1934) - Armand
- Flofloche (1934) - Antonin Floche
- One Night's Secret (1934) - Coco
- Three Sailors (1934) - Favouille
- L'école des contribuables (1934) - Gaston Valtier
- Paris-Deauville (1934) - Sosthène
- The Uncle from Peking (1934) - Antoine Robichon
- Nemo's Bank (1934)
- Le Billet de mille (1935) - Un soldat
- Compartiment de dames seules (1935) - Robert de Mérinville
- Aux portes de Paris (1935) - L'anguille
- Wedding Night (1935) - Laverdet
- Les dieux s'amusent (1935) - Mercure / Sosie
- The Pont-Biquet Family (1935) - La Reynette
- Dora Nelson (1935)
- Sacré Léonce (1936) - Léonce Vavin
- Michel Strogoff (1936) - Harry Blount
- You Can't Fool Antoinette (1936) - Hubert de Prémaillac
- School for Journalists (1936) - Alfred
- Oeil de lynx, détective (1936) - Marc Lanterne
- Les gaietés du palace (1936) - Honoré
- La dernière valse (1936) - Le vieux général
- Ménilmontant (1936)
- La peau d'un autre (1937) - Amédée Lambelin
- Pantins d'amour (1937) - Charles Prunier
- Le club des aristocrates (1937) - Alfred
- The Buttock (1937) - Le vicomte Édouard
- Le monsieur de 5 heures (1938) - Célestin Maravel
- Boys' School (1938) - Mazeau, le concierge
- Les femmes collantes (1938) - Séraphim Campluchard
- Conflict (1938) - Le greffier / Secretary
- Place de la Concorde (1939) - Altesse
- Raphaël le tatoué (1939) - Roger Drapeau
- My Aunt the Dictator (1939) - Monsieur Nicholas
- The Fatted Calf (1939) - Gabriel Vachon
- The World Will Tremble (1939 film) (1939) - Martelet
- The Merry Monarch (1939) - Monsieur Nicolas
- Sacred Woods (1939) - Monsieur des Fargottes
- Radio Surprises (1940) - M. Bontemps
- Ils étaient cinq permissionnaires (1945) - Abel Broux
- Father Serge (1945) - Aphamazy
- Hoboes in Paradise (1946) - Le croque-mort
- Destiny (1946) - Lobligeois
- Noah's Ark (1947) - Le baron Hugues Casenove
- Mandrin (1947) - Sansonnet
- Bichon (1948) - Augustin
- Impeccable Henri (1948) - Lopez
- The Woman I Murdered (1948) - Dupont-Verneuil
- On demande un assassin (1949) - Le croquemort
- Lost Souvenirs (1950) - Armand, le majordome de Jean-Pierre (episode "Une couronne mortuaire")
- Coeur-sur-Mer (1950) - Modeste Cotivet
- Les maître-nageurs (1950) - Billotte
- Tomorrow We Get Divorced (1951) - Saturnin
- Les mémoires de la vache Yolande (1951) - L'agent 3333
- Coq en pâte (1951) - Le chasseur du restaurant
- Piédalu in Paris (1951) - M. Finnois
- That Rascal Anatole (1951) - Me Tedet
- Les deux Monsieur de Madame (1951) - Monsieur Chèvre
- Un amour de parapluie (1951, Short)
- Le costaud des Batignolles (1952) - Nicolas - Le valet de chambre
- Trois vieilles filles en folie (1952) - Arsène Cupidon
- Naked in the Wind (1953) - Théophase Darcepoil
- Quintuplets in the Boarding School (1953) - L'Inspecteur d'Académie
- My Childish Father (1953) - Révérend James Holiday
- Boum sur Paris (1953) - Calchas
- Three Days of Fun in Paris (1954) - L'agent matrimonial Cocarel
- On déménage le colonel (1955) - M. Grivier
- Coup dur chez les mous (1956) - L'oncle
- Le colonel est de la revue (1957) - Le colonel
- Miss Catastrophe (1957) - Le directeur de la banque
- Pas de grisbi pour Ricardo (1957)
- Une nuit au Moulin-Rouge (1957)
- Fumée blonde (1957) - L'illusionniste Grand Jacoby
- La blonde des tropiques (1957) - Inspecteur Fourache
- It's All Adam's Fault (1958) - L'ambassadeur
- La môme aux boutons (1958)
- Loin de Rueil (1961, TV Movie) - Des Cigales
- La bande à Bobo (1963) - Antoine
- Les aventures de Monsieur Pickwick (1964, TV Mini-Series) - Winckle
