= Tomorrow We Get Divorced =

1951 film

- Directed by: Louis Cuny
- Written by: Jacques Constant; Louis Cuny
- Produced by: Hélène Cuny; Louis Cuny
- Starring: Sophie Desmarets; Jean Desailly; Armand Bernard
- Cinematography: Pierre Juillard
- Edited by: Pierre Juillard
- Music by: Louiguy
- Production companies: Célia Films; DisCina
- Distributed by: DisCina
- Release date: 2 February 1951
- Running time: 85 minutes
- Country: France
- Language: French

Tomorrow We Get Divorced (French: Demain nous divorçons) is a 1951 French comedy film directed by Louis Cuny and starring Sophie Desmarets, Jean Desailly and Armand Bernard. The film's sets were designed by the art director René Renoux.

== Synopsis ==
In Paris a young couple continually feud and tell their lawyer to begin divorce proceedings, only to calm down and lovingly reconcile. One time a more serious division comes between them and it looks like they may finally be heading for a real separation.

== Cast ==
- Sophie Desmarets as Colette Blanchet
- Jean Desailly as Max Blachet
- Armand Bernard as Saturnin
- Raphaël Patorni as Me Edouard Vermorel
- Denise Grey as Mme Tourelle
- Jean Gaven as Johnny Buck
- Suzet Maïs as Tati
- Christine Jaubert as Jeanne
- Mag-Avril as Marie Robin
- Albert Michel as Le valet de chambre
- Claudette Falco as Maggy
- Magali Noël as Jeanne Tourelle
- Lita Recio as La chanteuse
- Jean-Louis Allibert as Le client
- Fabien Loris as Roberto

== Bibliography ==
- Barrot, Olivier & Chirat, Raymond. Noir et blanc: 250 acteurs du cinéma français, 1930-1960. Flammarion, 2000.
- Bessy, Maurice & Chirat, Raymond. Histoire du cinéma français: 1951-1955. Pygmalion, 1989.
- Rège, Philippe. Encyclopedia of French Film Directors, Volume 1. Scarecrow Press, 2009.
