= If You Wish It =

1932 film

- Directed by: André Hugon
- Written by: André Hugon
- Starring: Jeanne Boitel; Armand Bernard; Janine Merrey
- Cinematography: Marc Bujard
- Music by: Raoul Moretti
- Production company: Films André Hugon
- Distributed by: Gaumont-Franco-Film-Aubert
- Release date: 16 September 1932
- Running time: 86 minutes
- Country: France
- Language: French

If You Wish It (French: Si tu veux) is a 1932 French comedy film directed by André Hugon and starring Jeanne Boitel, Armand Bernard and Janine Merrey. The film's sets were designed by the art director Robert-Jules Garnier.

== Synopsis ==
A novelist meets a disgruntled gentleman reader and surprisingly the two romantically bond. Meanwhile, her chauffeur falls in love with the reader's secretary.

== Cast ==
- Jeanne Boitel as Maryse
- Armand Bernard as Jérôme
- Janine Merrey as Irma
- Jacques Maury as André
- Alice Tissot as La logeuse
- André Dubosc as Ducygne
- Henri Kerny as Barette
- Antonin Berval as Renaud
- Hélène Regelly

== Bibliography ==
- Crisp, Colin. Genre, Myth and Convention in the French Cinema, 1929-1939. Indiana University Press, 2002.
