= Married Life (1921 film) =

1921 film

- Directed by: Georges Tréville
- Written by: J.B. Buckstone (play); Adrian Johnstone
- Starring: Gerald McCarthy; Peggy Hathaway; Roger Tréville; Hilda Anthony
- Production company: Ideal Film Company
- Distributed by: Ideal Film Company
- Release date: October 1921
- Country: United Kingdom
- Language: English

Married Life is a 1921 British silent drama film directed by Georges Tréville and starring Gerald McCarthy, Peggy Hathaway and Roger Tréville. It was based on a play by J.B. Buckstone.

The film revolves around an adopted daughter who falls in love with the son of a financier, who blackmails her foster family and is in fact her real father.

== Cast ==
- Gerald McCarthy - Arthur Winchester
- Peggy Hathaway - Margaret
- Roger Tréville - Charles Dawson
- Hilda Anthony - Mrs. Winchester
- M. Gray Murray - Mr. Dawson
- Cameron Hildebrand - George
- Hugh Higson
- Dorothy Fane
- Beatrix Templeton
- Gordon Begg
- Leonard Robson

== Bibliography ==
- Goble, Alan (1999). The Complete Index to Literary Sources in Film. Bowker-Saur. ISBN 1-85739-229-9.
