= Ni vu, ni connu =

1958 film

- Directed by: Yves Robert
- Written by: Alphonse Allais; Jacques Celhay
- Produced by: Jules Borkon
- Starring: Louis de Funès
- Cinematography: Jacques Letellier
- Edited by: Gilbert Natot
- Music by: Jean Wiener
- Production company: Champs-Élysées Productions
- Distributed by: Pathé Consortium Cinéma
- Release date: 23 April 1958 (France)
- Running time: 95 minutes
- Country: France
- Language: French
- Box office: $18.8 million

Ni vu, ni connu (literally "Neither seen, nor known"), also known by its English title Neither Seen, Nor Recognized, is a French 1958 comedy film, directed by Yves Robert and starring Louis de Funès. The film is based on the novel L'Affaire Blaireau (The Blaireau Case) by Alphonse Allais. The story had previously been adapted for the screen in 1923 and in 1932.

== Plot ==
In the wine-growing village of Montpaillard, the humorless gamekeeper Parju is determined to bring in the wily poacher Blaireau. One night, he is accidentally knocked out by Armand Fléchard, a young piano teacher, but is convinced the attacker was Blaireau and has him arrested. However, Blaireau knows how to take advantage of any situation, and what he makes of being arrested benefits the entire village, including Fléchard and his girlfriend, Arabella, the daughter of the local landowner.

== Cast ==
- Louis de Funès: Léon Blaireau, the poacher
- Moustache: Ovide Parju, the gamekeeper
- Noëlle Adam: Arabella de Chaville, the landowner's daughter
- Madeleine Barbulée: Mme de Chaville, Arabella's mother
- Claude Rich: Armand Fléchard, piano teacher and Arabella's beloved
- Frédéric Duvallès: Monsieur Dubenoit, the mayor
- Roland Armontel: Léon de Chaville, the local landowner, Arabella's father
- Pierre Mondy: Monsieur Bluette, director of the local jail
- Jean-Marie Amato: Maître Guilloche, a lawyer, the mayor's political rival
- Lucien Hubert: Auguste, a villager
- Pierre Stéphen: the public prosecutor
- Robert Vattier: Monsieur Lerechigneux, the judge
- Paul Faivre: Victor, the chief jailkeeper
- Jean Bellanger: a prisoner, formerly a pedicurist
- Grégoire Gromoff: Grégory, a prisoner
- Henri Coutet: prisoner
- Max Montavon: prisoner
- Monette Dinay: Léontine, Dubenoit's housekeeper
- Danièle Delorme: admirer at the village fair
- Colette Ricard: Mademoiselle Rose
- Pierre Mirat: the owner of the local hotel
- Guy Favières: assistant to the mayor
- Marcel Rouze: policeman
- Charles Bayard: a legal assessor
- Yves Robert: wedding photographer
- Marc Blanchard: Monsieur Duranfort
- Raoul Saint-Yves: prisoner
- Jacques Couturier: policeman
- Francis Lemarque: whistling prisoner
- Bernard Charlan: doctor
- Jimmy Perrys: Antoine, a prisoner, formerly a tailor
- Jeanne de Funès (uncredited): admirer
- Also: Fout-le-camp, a dog; Napoléon, a crow; Lucienne, a magpie; Parju, a pig; and the members of the "club de la fine gaule".
