= The Uncle from Peking =

- Directed by: Jacques Darmont
- Written by: Charles L. Pothier; René Pujol
- Starring: Armand Bernard; Janine Merrey; Pierre Brasseur; Jean Dax
- Cinematography: Georges Benoît; René Colas
- Music by: Casimir Oberfeld
- Production company: Luna Film
- Release date: 1934
- Running time: 77 minutes
- Country: France
- Language: French

The Uncle from Peking (French: L'oncle de Pékin) is a 1934 French comedy film directed by Jacques Darmont and starring Armand Bernard, Janine Merrey and Pierre Brasseur.

The film's sets were designed by the art director Aimé Bazin.

== Cast ==
- Georges Benoît
- Armand Bernard as Antoine Robichon
- Berthier as railway station manager
- Armand Bour as the notary
- Pierre Brasseur as Philippe
- Germaine Charley as Yolande
- Jean Dax as Edgar Pinson
- Guy Derlan as a curator
- Frédéric Mariotti as a curator
- Claude May as Huguette
- Janine Merrey as Suzy
- Alexandre Mihalesco as the Chinese waiter
- Madame Milton as the castle guard
- André Numès Fils
- Armand Pouget as the coachman
- Monsieur Sablon as Barigoul
- Pierre Thomas as a peasant
- Georges Térof as Séraphin
- Marcel Vidal as Pierre

== Bibliography ==
- Rège, Philippe. Encyclopedia of French Film Directors, Volume 1. Scarecrow Press, 2009.
