= Little One (1935 film) =

1935 film

- Directed by: Henry Wulschleger
- Written by: Julien Duvivier; Yves Mirande
- Produced by: Pierre Gurgo-Salice
- Starring: Bach; Pierre Brasseur; Janine Merrey
- Cinematography: Scarciafico Hugo
- Edited by: Maurice Serein
- Music by: Vincent Scotto; Jean Yatove
- Production company: F.I.L.B.A.
- Distributed by: Lux Compagnie Cinématographique de France
- Release date: 23 August 1935
- Running time: 80 minutes
- Country: France
- Language: French

Little One (French: Bout de chou) is a 1935 French comedy film directed by Henry Wulschleger and starring Bach, Pierre Brasseur and Janine Merrey. The film's sets were designed by the art director Robert Gys.

== Synopsis ==
Marseille businessman Victor Darnetal is delighted to be invited by his playwright nephew Georges to attend the premiere of his latest work in Paris. To his surprise he discovers that his nephew's girlfriend Lucie has had a child, and that Georges has been so obsessed with his show that she hasn't told him. Worse, Victor finds out that Georges is in a relationship with the leading lady of his show and plans to marry her. Outraged Victor offers to marry Lucie and adopt her son as his heir, which in turn angers Victor's own long-standing girlfriend Nathalie.

== Cast ==
- Bach as Victor Darnetal
- Pierre Brasseur as Georges Darnetal
- Janine Merrey as Lucie
- Paul Ollivier as Cagibol
- Robert Darthez as L'acteur
- Pierre Juvenet as Le critique
- Sinoël as L'adjoint sourd
- Jacky Vilmont as Bout de chou
- Milly Mathis as Nathalie
- Tania Fédor as Léone de Vincy

== Bibliography ==
- Bessy, Maurice & Chirat, Raymond. Histoire du cinéma français: 1935-1939. Pygmalion, 1989.
- Crisp, Colin. Genre, Myth and Convention in the French Cinema, 1929-1939. Indiana University Press, 2002.
- Rège, Philippe. Encyclopedia of French Film Directors, Volume 1. Scarecrow Press, 2009.
