= Paris by Night (1930 film) =

1930 film by Henri Diamant-Berger

- Directed by: Henri Diamant-Berger
- Written by: Francis Carco
- Starring: Marguerite Moreno; Armand Bernard; Suzet Maïs
- Cinematography: Maurice Desfassiaux
- Music by: Jean Lenoir
- Production company: Erka-Prodisco
- Distributed by: Erka-Prodisco
- Release date: 26 December 1930
- Running time: 65 minutes
- Country: France
- Language: French

Paris by Night (French: Paris la nuit) is a 1930 French comedy film directed by Henri Diamant-Berger and starring Marguerite Moreno, Armand Bernard and Suzet Maïs.

== Synopsis ==
Rita, a young countess, wants to visit the lowest dives in Paris. It is arranged for her to go out and believe she has had a visit to the authentic underworld of Paris, while really keeping her safe. Things soon go awry when she encounters a genuine Apache.

== Cast ==
- Marguerite Moreno as Madame Zouzou
- Armand Bernard as Cramoisi
- Suzet Maïs as La comtesse Rita
- Jean-Louis Allibert as Bob
- Paul Azaïs as Bouledebois
- Bill Bocket as Totor
- Géo Charley as Jacques Mortimer
- Floryse as Georgette
- Jean Galland as Pierre Dubreuil
- Abel Jacquin as Fernand
- Alexandre Mathillon as Guimont
- Pierre Moreno as Tomate
- Renée Parme as Fabienne
- Jeanne Pérez as Mélie
- Marcel Vallée as Valentin

== Bibliography ==
- Bessy, Maurice & Chirat, Raymond. Histoire du cinéma français: 1929-1934. Pygmalion, 1988.
- Crisp, Colin. Genre, Myth and Convention in the French Cinema, 1929-1939. Indiana University Press, 2002.
- Dudley Andrew. Mists of Regret: Culture and Sensibility in Classic French Film. Princeton University Press, 1995.
- Rège, Philippe. Encyclopedia of French Film Directors, Volume 1. Scarecrow Press, 2009.
