= Ginette Maddie =

French actress (1898–1980)

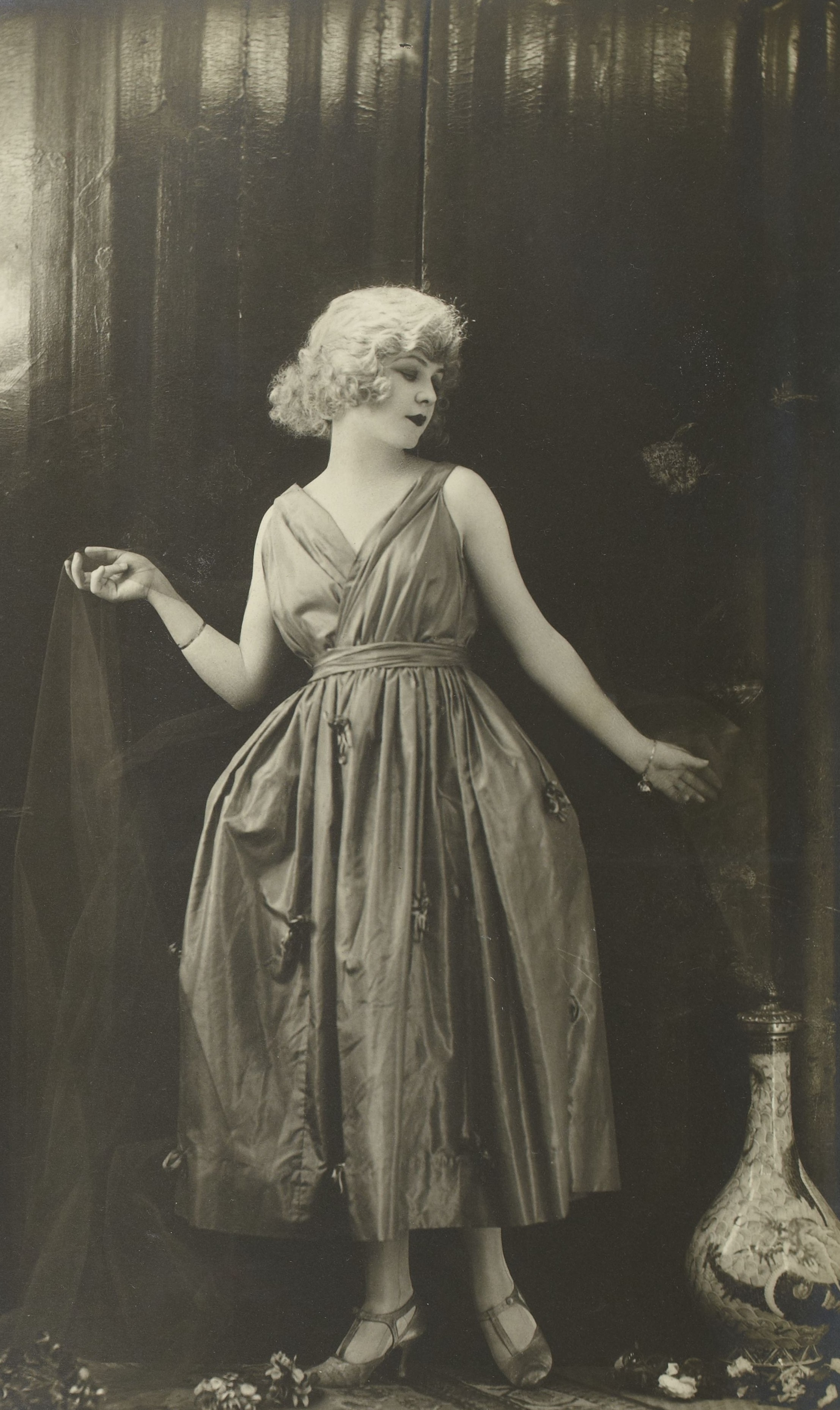
- Ginette Maddie photographed by Jean Reutlinger
- Born: Marcelle Namur; 25 February 1898; Paris, France
- Died: 7 April 1980 (aged 82); Paris, France
- Occupation: Actress
- Years active: 1922-1958 (film)

Ginette Maddie (1898–1980) was a French actress known for her appearances in French and German films during the silent era.

== Selected filmography ==
- The Black Diamond (1922)
- Sarati the Terrible (1923)
- The Gardens of Murcia (1923)
- The Thruster (1924)
- The Heirs of Uncle James (1924)
- The Painter and His Model (1924)
- The Pink Diamond (1926)
- Alone (1931)

== Bibliography ==
- Hardt, Ursula. From Caligari to California: Erich Pommer's life in the International Film Wars. Berghahn Books, 1996.
- Klossner, Michael. The Europe of 1500-1815 on Film and Television: A Worldwide Filmography of Over 2550 Works, 1895 Through 2000. McFarland & Company, 2002.
