= The Heirs of Uncle James =

1924 film

- Directed by: Alfred Machin; Henry Wulschleger
- Written by: Alfred Machin; Henry Wulschleger
- Produced by: Alfred Machin
- Cinematography: Mario Badouaille
- Production company: Les Films Alfred Machin
- Distributed by: Pathé Consortium Cinéma
- Release date: 24 October 1924
- Running time: 59 minutes
- Country: France
- Languages: Silent; French intertitles

The Heirs of Uncle James (French: Les héritiers de l'oncle James) is a 1924 French silent comedy film directed by Alfred Machin and Henry Wulschleger, and starring Ginette Maddie, Louis Monfils and Suzy Love.

== Cast ==
- Ginette Maddie as Ginette
- Louis Monfils as L'oncle James
- Suzy Love
- Madame Dempsey as Fanny la gouvernante
- Monsieur Schey as Cousin Burgham
- Georges Térof as Cousin Joris
- Claude Machin
- Monsieur de Nogine as Lieutenant John Sullivan
- Madame Giret as Cousine Burgham
- Ginette Machin

== Bibliography ==
- James Robert Parish & Kingsley Canham. Film Directors Guide: Western Europe. Scarecrow Press, 1976.
