= Georges Tréville =

French actor and film director

- Born: Georges Troly; 28 July 1875; Paris, France
- Died: 30 May 1944 (aged 68); Wy-dit-Joly, Picardy, France
- Occupations: Film actor, Film director
- Children: Roger Tréville

Georges Tréville (28 July 1875 – 30 May 1944) was a French actor and film director.

Born as Georges Troly, during the silent era, he played the gentlemen thief Arsène Lupin in several short films. He also went to Britain to direct and star in the Éclair film series of Sherlock Holmes stories for the Éclair film company. Tréville later directed two British films for the Ideal Film Company. He was married to actress Fanny Delisle (1881–1969) and their son Roger Tréville (1902–2005) was also a stage and film actor.

== Selected filmography ==
Actor

- The Copper Beeches (1912)
- I Will Repay (1923)
- Das Spielzeug von Paris (1925)
- Moulin Rouge (1928)
- Our Masters, the Servants (1930)
- The Mystery of the Yellow Room (1930)
- La Femme d'une nuit (1931)
- Companion Wanted (1932)
- The Blaireau Case (1932)
- Kiss Me (1932)
- The Regiment's Champion (1932)
- A Happy Man (1932)
- Bach the Millionaire (1933)
- To Be Loved (1933)
- Bach the Detective (1936)

Director

- Married Life (1921)
- All Sorts and Conditions of Men (1921)
- Caught in the Act (1931)

== Bibliography ==
- Abel, Richard. The Ciné Goes to Town: French Cinema, 1896-1914. University of California Press, 1998.
- St. Pierre, Paul Matthew. E.A. Dupont and his Contribution to British Film: Varieté, Moulin Rouge, Piccadilly, Atlantic, Two Worlds, Cape Forlorn. Fairleigh Dickinson University Press, 2010
