= Roger Tréville =

French actor (1902–2005)

Roger Tréville (17 November 1902, in Paris – 27 September 2005, in Beaumont-du-Périgord) was a French actor. He was born as Roger Troly; his parents, Georges Tréville (1875–1944) and Fanny Delisle (1881–1969), were also stage and film actors.

== Selected filmography ==
- The Rotters (1921)
- Married Life (1921)
- Sinister Street (1922)
- Jack (1925)
- My Childish Father (1930)
- Venetian Nights (1931)
- His Highness Love (1931)
- Durand Versus Durand (1931)
- You Will Be My Wife (1932)
- Abduct Me (1932)
- Beauty Spot (1932)
- Bach the Millionaire (1933)
- The Slipper Episode (1935)
- Speak to Me of Love (1935)
- Jacques and Jacotte (1936)
- The Porter from Maxim's (1939)
- Brilliant Waltz (1949)
- The Green Glove (1952)
- Stopover in Orly (1955)
- The Bride Is Much Too Beautiful (1956)
- The Happy Road (1957)
- Ponzio Pilato (1962)
- How to Steal a Million (1966)
