= Blanche Montel =

French actress

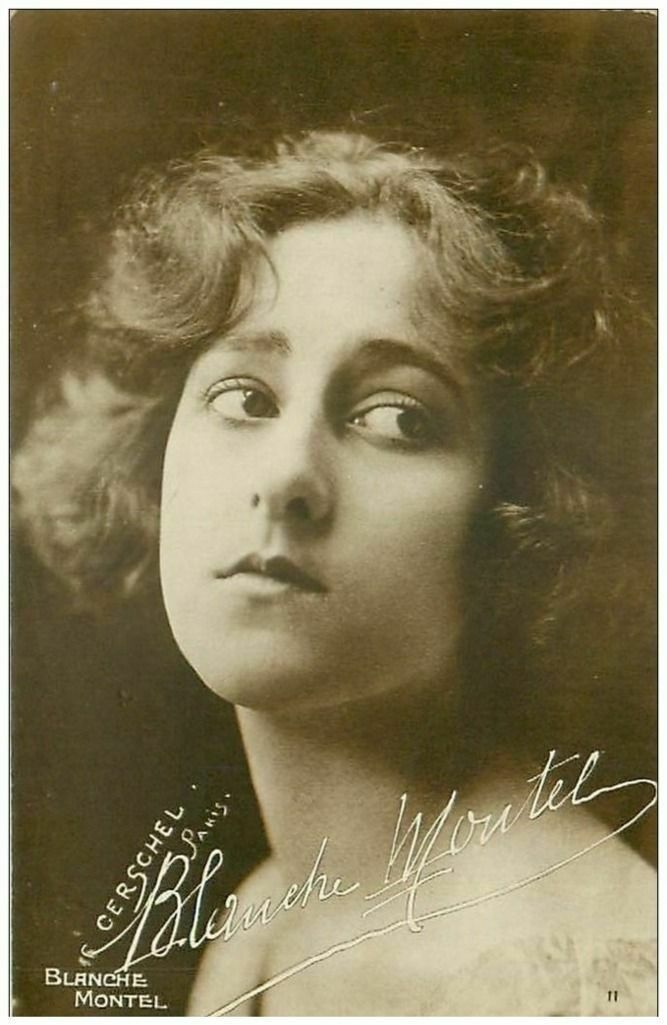
- Montel, 1920s
- Born: 14 August 1902; Tours, French Third Republic
- Died: 31 March 1998 (aged 95); Luzarches, France
- Occupation: Actress
- Spouses: Henri Decoin (m. 1927; div. 1934) Jean-Pierre Aumont (m. 1938; div. 1940)
- Children: 1

Blanche Montel (14 August 1902 – 31 March 1998) was a French actress. She appeared in 33 films between 1914 and 1943.

Filmography
A Tragedy in the Clouds
Barrabas
Chichinette et Cie
The Two Girls
Zidore ou les métamorphoses
Séraphin ou les jambes nues
L'orpheline
Gustave est médium
Son altesse
Gaëtan ou le commis audacieux
The Girl of the Dust Bin
Pax Domine
L'affaire du courrier de Lyon
The Beauty from Nivernais
Une vieille marquise très riche
L'éveilleur d'instincts
Le roi de la pédale
The Vocation of André Carel (1925)
Infernal Circle
L'Arlésienne
Caught in the Act
Claire de lune
The Blaireau Case
The Miracle Child
The Nice Adventure
Miquette et sa mère
The Blue Ones of the Sky
La maison du mystère
The Three Musketeers (1932)
The Adventurer (1934)
Mon père et mon papa
Durand Jewellers (1938)
The London Man
