= Léon Larive =

French actor (1886–1961)

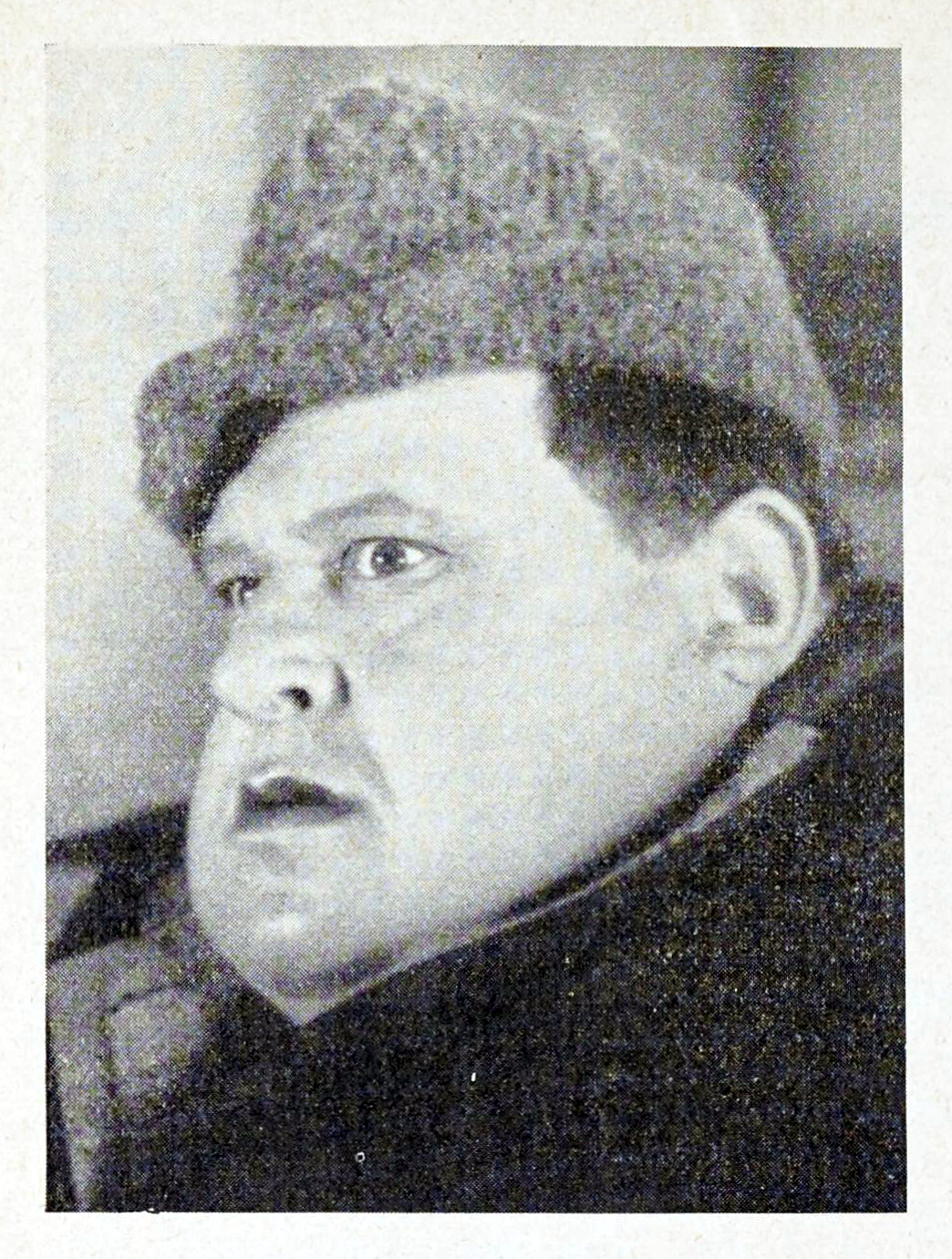
- Born: 28 June 1886; Paris, France
- Died: 20 July 1961 (aged 75); Paris, France
- Occupation: Actor
- Years active: 1923-1961

Léon François Larive (28 June 1886 – 20 July 1961) was a French film actor. He appeared in more than 90 films between 1923 and 1961.

== Selected filmography ==
- Two Timid Souls (1928)
- The Great Passion (1928)
- La Passion de Jeanne d'Arc (1928)
- The Wonderful Day (1929)
- All That's Not Worth Love (1931)
- Zero for Conduct (1933)
- Casanova (1934)
- The Typist Gets Married (1934)
- Madame Bovary (1934)
- Bach the Detective (1936)
- Girls of Paris (1936)
- The Tale of the Fox (1937)
- Claudine at School (1937)
- The Little Thing (1938)
- The Novel of Werther (1938)
- Rasputin (1938)
- The Train for Venice (1938)
- The Mayor's Dilemma (1939)
- The Rules of the Game (1939)
- The White Slave (1939)
- Sacred Woods (1939)
- Cristobal's Gold (1940)
- Strange Inheritance (1943)
- The Bellman (1945)
- François Villon (1945)
- The Crowned Fish Tavern (1947)
- Clochemerle (1948)
- Return to Life (1949)
- Doctor Laennec (1949)
- Daybreak (1949)
- Wedding Night (1950)
- The Voyage to America (1951)
- Never Two Without Three (1951)
- The Darling of His Concierge (1951)
- Quintuplets in the Boarding School (1953)
- When You Read This Letter (1953)
- I'll Get Back to Kandara (1956)
