= The Blaireau Case (1923 film) =

1923 film

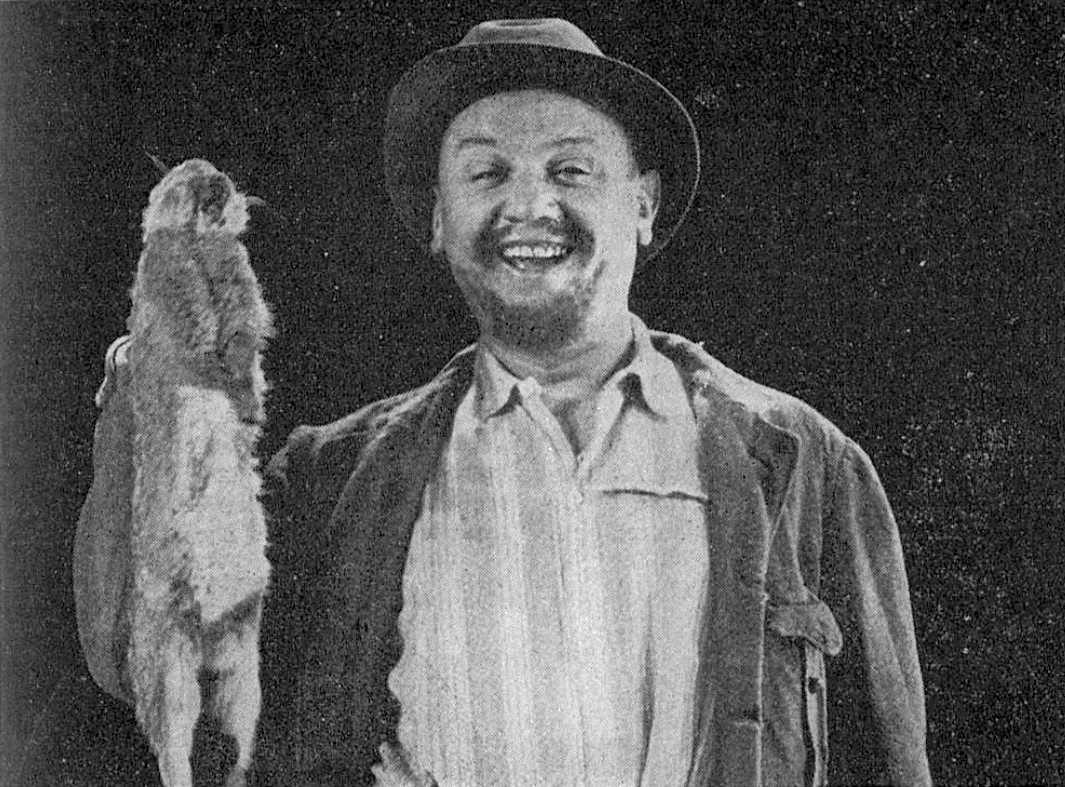
- André Brunot as Blaireau on set (1923)
- Directed by: Louis Osmont
- Written by: Alphonse Allais (novel); Louis Osmont
- Starring: André Brunot; Émile Saint-Ober; Marise Dorval
- Cinematography: Paul Guichard; Julien Ringel
- Production company: Pathé Consortium Cinéma
- Distributed by: Pathé Consortium Cinéma
- Release date: 14 September 1923
- Country: France
- Languages: Silent; French intertitles

The Blaireau Case (French:L'affaire Blaireau) is a 1923 French silent film directed by Louis Osmont and starring André Brunot, Émile Saint-Ober and Marise Dorval. Based on the 1899 novel L'affaire Blaireau by Alphonse Allais, it was remade twice in 1932 as The Blaireau Case and in 1958 as Neither Seen Nor Recognized.

== Cast ==
- André Brunot as Blaireau
- Émile Saint-Ober as Maître Guilloche
- Marise Dorval as Delphine de Serquigny
- Marcelle Duval as Arabella de Chaville
- Anny Fleurville as Madame de Chaville
- Gaston Gabaroche as Jules Fléchard
- Heller as Parju
- Geo Leclercq as Baron de Hautpertuis
- De Winter as Monsieur Bluette

== Bibliography ==
- Alfred Krautz. International directory of cinematographers set- and costume designers in film. Saur, 1983.
