= Robert Bibal =

French film director

- Born: 8 February 1900; Paris, France
- Died: 5 January 1973 (aged 72); Paris, France
- Occupations: Director, Writer
- Years active: 1932-1961 (film)

Robert Bibal (1900–1973) was a French film director and screenwriter.

== Selected filmography ==
- The Mad Night (1932)
- A Gentleman of the Ring (1932)
- Double Crime in the Maginot Line (1937)
- The Fugitive (1947)
- My Aunt from Honfleur (1949)
- The Adventurers of the Air (1950)
- Wedding Night (1950)
- The Darling of His Concierge (1951)
- Little Jacques (1953)
- Dangerous Turning (1954)
- Every Minute Counts (1960)

== Bibliography ==
- Goble, Alan. The Complete Index to Literary Sources in Film. Walter de Gruyter, 1999.
