= René Jayet =

French film director and producer

- Born: 20 May 1906; Paris
- Died: 31 October 1953 (aged 47); Paris
- Occupation(s): Film director, screenwriter, producer

René Jayet (20 May 1906 – 31 October 1953) was a French film director and producer. He made his debut in 1928 with Une femme a passé, starring Camille Bardou among others. Followed Des quintuplés au pensionnat, Moumou, Les Aventuriers de l'air, Une nuit de noces and Le Cabaret du grand large.

== Filmography ==
=== Director ===
- Une femme a passé (1928)
- Casaque damier... toque blanche (1928)
- Couturier de mon cœur (1935)
- Le Champion de ces dames (1935)
- Passeurs d'hommes (1937)
- Deuxième bureau contre kommandantur (1939)
- Retour au bonheur (1940)
- Ici l'on pêche (1941)
- Vingt-cinq ans de bonheur (1943)
- Le Cabaret du grand large (1946)
- Le Testament (1946, short)
- Cinq à sept (1946, short)
- Mandrin (1947)
- L'Homme de la nuit (1947)
- Bichon (1948)
- Le dernier quart d'heure (1949, short)
- My Aunt from Honfleur (1949)
- Wedding Night (1950)
- The Adventurers of the Air (1950)
- The Darling of His Concierge (1951)
- Moumou (1951)
- Quintuplets in the Boarding School (1953)

=== Producer ===
- 1949 : Le dernier quart d'heure (short film)
- 1950 : Les Aventuriers de l'air
- 1951 : Moumou
