= The Black Diamond (1922 film) =

1922 film

- Directed by: André Hugon
- Written by: Jean Aicard (novel); André Hugon
- Starring: Claude Mérelle; Ginette Maddie; Armand Bernard
- Cinematography: Karémine Mérobian
- Production company: Films André Hugon
- Release date: 29 September 1922
- Country: France
- Languages: Silent; French intertitles

The Black Diamond (French: Le diamant noir) is a 1922 French silent mystery film directed by André Hugon and starring Claude Mérelle, Ginette Maddie and Armand Bernard.

== Cast ==
- Claude Mérelle as Fräulein
- Ginette Maddie as Nora
- Armand Bernard as Gottfried
- Pierre Fresnay as Bouvier
- Henry Krauss as Monsieur de Mitry
- Romuald Joubé as Monsieur de Fresnay
- Charles de Rochefort
- Irène Sabel
- Jean Toulout

== Bibliography ==
- Rège, Philippe. Encyclopedia of French Film Directors, Volume 1. Scarecrow Press, 2009.
