= Léopold Marchand =

French writer (1891–1952)

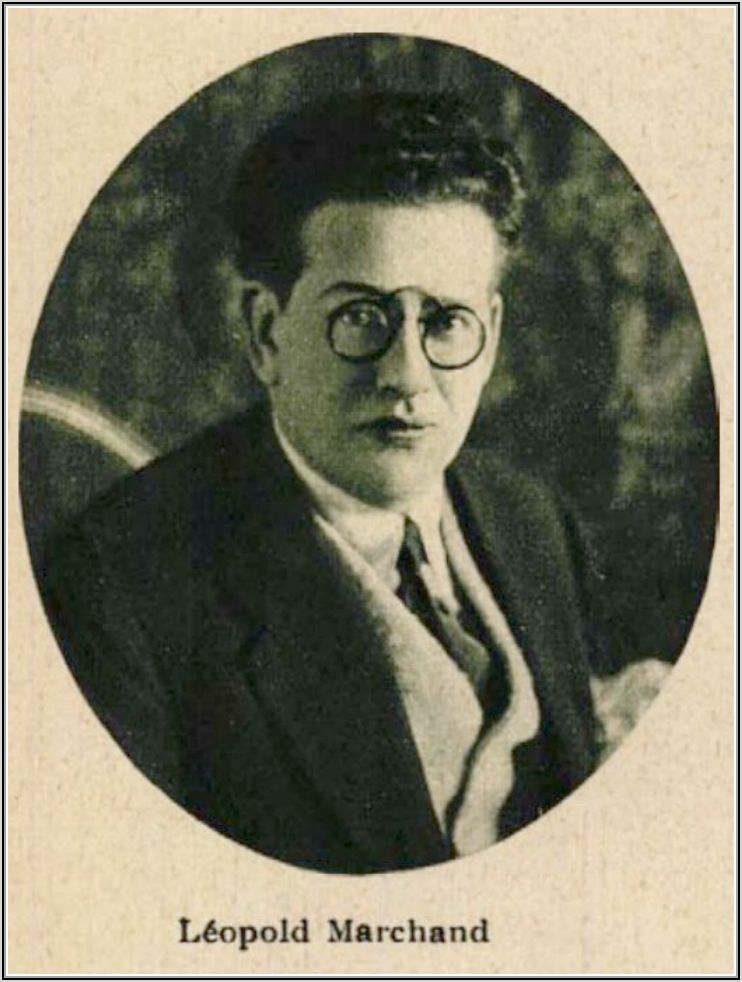
- Born: 5 February 1891; Paris, France
- Died: 25 November 1952 (aged 61); Paris, France
- Occupation: Screenwriter

Léopold Marchand (1891–1952) was a French playwright and screenwriter. A number of his stage works were adapted into films. In 1942 during the Vichy era his Jewish wife Misz Hertz committed suicide shortly before the Vel' d'Hiv Roundup.

== Selected filmography ==
- Fashions for Women (1927)
- My Childish Father (1930)
- Circulez! (1931)
- The Nude Woman (1932)
- Love Me Tonight (1932)
- Topaze (1933)
- We Are Not Children (1934)
- The Fakir of the Grand Hotel (1934)
- Fedora (1934)
- Lucrezia Borgia (1935)
- Samson (1936)
- A Hen on a Wall (1936)
- The Assault (1936)
- Balthazar (1937)
- Three Waltzes (1938)
- Durand Jewellers (1938)
- Mirages (1938)
- Hangman's Noose (1940)
- The Master Valet (1941)
- Last Adventure (1942)
- Business Is Business (1942)
- Secret Documents (1945)
- The Adventure of Cabassou (1946)
- The Legend of Faust (1949)
- Cartouche, King of Paris (1950)
- My Childish Father (1953)

== Bibliography ==
- Goble, Alan. The Complete Index to Literary Sources in Film. Walter de Gruyter, 1999.
- Leteux, Christine. Continental Films: French Cinema under German Control. University of Wisconsin Press, 2022.
