= Sarati the Terrible (1937 film) =

1937 film

- Directed by: André Hugon
- Written by: Jacques Constant; Jean Vignaud (novel)
- Produced by: André Hugon
- Starring: Harry Baur; George Rigaud; Jacqueline Laurent
- Cinematography: André Bayard; Tahar Hanache
- Edited by: Fanchette Mazin
- Music by: Jacques Janin; Mahieddine; Vincent Scotto
- Production company: Films André Hugon
- Distributed by: Cinéma de France
- Release date: 30 July 1937
- Running time: 102 minutes
- Country: France
- Language: French

Sarati the Terrible (French: Sarati, le terrible) is a 1937 French drama film directed by André Hugon and starring Harry Baur, George Rigaud and Jacqueline Laurent. The film's sets were designed by the art director Émile Duquesne.

== Cast ==
- Harry Baur as César Sarati
- George Rigaud as Gilbert de Kéradec
- Jacqueline Laurent as Rose
- Rika Radifé as Remedios
- Marcel Dalio as Benoît
- Charles Granval as Jean Hudelot
- Jean Tissier as Beppo
- Jeanne Helbling as Rosy
- Nadine Picard as Alice
- Yvonne Hébert as Maryse
- Pierre de Guingand as Berneville
- Kssentini as Ahmed
- Anny Arbo
- Louis Eymond as Un ami de Berneville

== Cast ==
- Sarati the Terrible (1923)

== Bibliography ==
- Rège, Philippe. Encyclopedia of French Film Directors, Volume 1. Scarecrow Press, 2009.
