= Sarati the Terrible (1923 film) =

1923 film

- Directed by: René Hervil; Louis Mercanton
- Produced by: Louis Aubert
- Starring: Henri Baudin; André Feramus; Ginette Maddie
- Cinematography: Raymond Agnel
- Production company: Société des Films Mercanton
- Distributed by: Etablissements Louis Aubert
- Release date: 7 September 1923
- Country: France
- Languages: Silent; French intertitles

Sarati the Terrible (French:Sarati, le terrible) is a 1923 French silent film directed by René Hervil and Louis Mercanton and starring Henri Baudin, André Feramus and Ginette Maddie. In 1937 it was remade as a sound film.

== Cast ==
- Henri Baudin as Sarati
- André Feramus as Gilbert de Kéradec
- Ginette Maddie as Rose
- Arlette Marchal as Hélène
- Pâquerette as Remedios

== Bibliography ==
- Rège, Philippe. Encyclopedia of French Film Directors, Volume 1. Scarecrow Press, 2009.
