= Jacques Darmont =

French film director

Jacques Darmont was a French film director author of three films in the 1930s.

== Filmography ==
- 1933: La Margoton du bataillon
- 1934: The Uncle from Peking
- 1936: J'arrose mes galons
