= Henry Wulschleger =

French screenwriter and film director

- Born: 31 July 1894; 3rd arrondissement of Paris, France
- Died: 4 March 1943 (aged 48); 17th arrondissement of Paris
- Other name: Henri Wulschleger
- Occupations: Director, Writer
- Years active: 1920-1940 (film)

Henry Wulschleger or Henri Wulschleger (1894–1943) was a French screenwriter and film director.

== Selected filmography ==
- Une nuit agitée (1920)
- Pervenche (1921) (co-direction : Alfred Machin)
- Moi aussi, j'accuse (1923) (screenwriter)
- L'énigme du Mont-Agel (1923) (co-direction: Alfred Machin)
- The Heirs of Uncle James (1924) (script)
- Le Nègre blanc (1925) (co-direction : Nicolas Rinsky)
- Humanité (1925)
- Bêtes comme les hommes (1925) (coréalisation : Alfred Machin)
- Le Manoir de la peur (1927) (coréalisation : Alfred Machin)
- Captain Fracasse (1929) (assistant and screenwriter)
- Elle veut faire du cinéma (1930)
- La Prison en folie (1931)
- En bordée (1931)
- The Blaireau Case (1932)
- The Regiment's Champion (1932)
- Tire-au-flanc (1933)
- Bach the Millionaire (1933)
- L'Enfant de ma sœur (1933)
- Sidonie Panache (1934)
- Le Train de 8 heures 47 (1934)
- Little One (1935)
- Debout là-dedans! (1935)
- Tout va très bien madame la marquise (1936)
- Le Cantinier de la coloniale (1938)
- Gargousse (1938)
- Bach en correctionnelle (1940)

== Bibliography ==
- Crisp, Colin. French Cinema—A Critical Filmography: Volume 1, 1929–1939. Indiana University Press, 2015.
