= List of French films of 1932 =

French films released in 1932

A list of films produced in France in 1932:

== A-L ==
Title	Director	Cast	Genre	Notes
Abduct Me	Léonce Perret	Jacqueline Francell, Roger Tréville, Arletty	Comedy	
The Accomplice	Giuseppe Guarino	Jean Bradin, Philippe Richard	Comedy	
Aces of the Turf	Serge de Poligny	Jeanne Fusier-Gir, Marcel Barencey, Paul Pauley	Sports	
Amourous Adventure	Wilhelm Thiele	Albert Préjean, Marie Glory, Jeanne Boitel	Romantic comedy	Tobis
Antoinette	Herbert Selpin	Jeanne Boitel, Armand Bernard, Rolla Norman	Comedy	
Baleydier	Jean Mamy	Michel Simon, Josseline Gaël, Jean Gehret	Comedy	
Baroud	Rex Ingram, Alice Terry	Pierre Batcheff, Colette Darfeuil, Andrews Engelmann	Adventure	
The Beautiful Sailor	Harry Lachman	Pierre Blanchar, Madeleine Renaud, Jean Gabin	Drama	
Beauty Spot	Pierre Caron, Léonce Perret	Simone Cerdan, Marfa d'Hervilly, Roger Tréville	Musical	
Billeting Order	Charles-Félix Tavano	André Berley, Jeanne Helbling, Georges Melchior	Comedy	
The Blaireau Case	Henry Wulschleger	Bach, Alice Tissot, Renée Passeur	Comedy	
Boudu Saved from Drowning	Jean Renoir	Michel Simon, Charles Granval, Marcelle Hainia	Comedy	
Buridan's Donkey	Alexandre Ryder	René Lefèvre, Colette Darfeuil, Mona Goya	Comedy	
The Champion Cook	Karl Anton	Pierre Bertin, Jeanne Helbling, Lucien Baroux	Comedy	
The Chocolate Girl	Marc Allégret	Simone Simon, Pierre Bertin, Raimu	Comedy drama	
Clochard	Robert Péguy	Georges Biscot, Simone Cerdan, Marcel Barencey	Comedy	
Cognasse	Louis Mercanton	Thérèse Dorny, Marguerite Moreno, André Roanne	Comedy	
Companion Wanted	Joe May	Jean Murat, Annabella, José Noguero	Comedy	
Côte d'Azur	Roger Capellani	Simone Héliard, Robert Burnier, Robert Arnoux	Comedy	
Danton	André Roubaud	Jacques Grétillat, Andrée Ducret, Jacques Dumesnil	Historical	
Dainah the Mulatto	Jean Grémillon	Charles Vanel, Habib Benglia, Gaston Dubosc	Drama	
A Dog That Pays Off	Jean Choux	René Lefèvre, Arletty, Christiane Dor	Comedy	
The Dressmaker of Luneville	Harry Lachman	Madeleine Renaud, Pierre Blanchar, Armand Lurville	Comedy	
Fanny	Marc Allégret, Marcel Pagnol	Raimu, Pierre Fresnay, Orane Demazis	Drama, romance	
Fantômas	Paul Fejos	Jean Galland, Thomy Bourdelle, Tania Fédor	Crime horror	
A Father Without Knowing It	Robert Wyler	Noël-Noël, Pierre Brasseur, Françoise Rosay	Comedy	
Fifty Fathoms Deep	Jack Forrester	Jeanne Helbling, Thomy Bourdelle	Drama	
Fun in the Barracks	Maurice Tourneur	Henry Roussell, Mady Berry, Fernandel	Comedy drama	
A Gentleman of the Ring	Robert Bibal	Vanda Gréville, Gaston Dubosc	Sports	
Happy Hearts	Hanns Schwarz, Max de Vaucorbeil	Josseline Gaël, Gabriel Gabrio, Jean Gabin	Comedy	
A Happy Man	Antonin Bideau	Claude Dauphin, Alice Tissot	Comedy	
Heart of Paris	Marie Epstein	Simone Mareuil, Jimmy Gaillard	Comedy	
He Is Charming	Louis Mercanton	Meg Lemonnier, Henri Garat	Musical	
Here's Berlin	Julien Duvivier	Josette Day, Germaine Aussey	Comedy	Co-production with Germany
His Best Client	Pierre Colombier	Elvire Popesco, René Lefèvre	Comedy	
If You Wish It	André Hugon	Jeanne Boitel, Armand Bernard	Comedy	
Imperial Violets	Henry Roussel	Raquel Meller, Suzanne Bianchetti	Historical	
The Improvised Son	René Guissart	Fernand Gravey, Florelle	Comedy	
In the Name of the Law	Maurice Tourneur	Marcelle Chantal, Gabriel Gabrio	Crime	
King of the Hotel	Carmine Gallone	Jules Berry, Betty Stockfeld, Simone Simon	Comedy	Co-production with the United Kingdom
Kiss Me	Léon Mathot	Abel Tarride, Tania Fédor	Comedy	
The Last Blow	Jacques de Baroncelli	Jean Murat, Danièle Parola	Drama	
L'affaire est dans le sac (It's in the Bag)	Pierre Prévert	Étienne Decroux, Jean-Paul Le Chanois, Julien Carette, Philippe Richard, Anthony Gildès, Jacques Brunius	Comedy	Pierre Prévert's first film; screenplay by Jacques Prévert.
L'Atlantide	G. W. Pabst	Brigitte Helm, Pierre Blanchar, Tela Tschai	Adventure, fantasy	Co-production with Germany
The Lacquered Box	Jean Kemm	Danielle Darrieux, René Alexandre	Crime	
The Levy Department Stores	André Hugon	Léon Belières, Charles Lamy	Comedy	
Lilac	Anatole Litvak	Marcelle Romée, Jean Gabin, André Luguet	Crime drama	
Love and Luck	Monty Banks	Max Dearly, Ginette Gaubert Olga Valéry	Comedy	

== M-Z ==
Title	Director	Cast	Genre	Notes
The Mad Night	Robert Bibal	Marguerite Deval, Suzanne Bianchetti	Comedy	
Make-Up	Karl Anton	Robert Burnier, Rosine Deréan, Edwige Feuillère	Drama	
The Marriage of Mademoiselle Beulemans	Jean Choux	Pierre Alcover, Arthur Devère	Comedy	Co-production with Belgium
Maurin of the Moors	André Hugon	Antonin Berval, Jeanne Boitel	Comedy	
Miche	Jean de Marguenat	Suzy Vernon, Robert Burnier	Drama	
Monsieur Albert	Karl Anton	Noël-Noël, Betty Stockfeld, Edwige Feuillère	Comedy	
Monsieur, Madame and Bibi	Jean Boyer, Max Neufeld	René Lefèvre, Marie Glory	Comedy	Co-production with Germany
Moonlight	Henri Diamant-Berger	Blanche Montel, Claude Dauphin, Henri Rollan	Comedy	
My Priest Among the Rich	Émile-Bernard Donatien	Jim Gérald, Alice Roberts, André Roanne	Comedy	
Nicole and Her Virtue	René Hervil	Alice Cocéa, André Roanne	Drama	
Night at the Crossroads	Jean Renoir	Pierre Renoir, Winna Winifred	Crime	
The Night at the Hotel	Leo Mittler	Jean Périer, Betty Stockfeld	Drama	
Night Shift	Henri Fescourt	Marcel Barencey, Gaston Dupray, Paulette Dubost	Comedy	
Nights in Port Said	Leo Mittler	Renée Héribel, Gustav Diessl	Drama	
No Women	Mario Bonnard	Georgius, Fernandel, Raymond Aimos	Comedy	
The Nude Woman	Jean-Paul Paulin	Florelle, Raymond Rouleau	Drama	
Orange Blossom	Henry Roussel	André Lefaur, André Alerme	Comedy	
Our Lord's Vineyard	René Hervil	Victor Boucher, Simone Cerdan	Comedy	
Panurge	Michel Bernheim	Danielle Darrieux, Jean Marconi, Paul Poiret	Comedy	
Passionately	René Guissart, Louis Mercanton	Florelle, Fernand Gravey, Louis Baron	Musical	
The Picador	Lucien Jaquelux	Madeleine Guitty, Enrique Riveros	Drama	
The Red Head	Julien Duvivier	Robert Lynen, Harry Baur	Drama	
The Regiment's Champion	Henry Wulschleger	Bach, Georges Tréville	Comedy	
Rouletabille the Aviator	Steve Sekely	Roland Toutain, Léon Belières, Germaine Aussey	Thriller	Co-production with Hungary
Sailor's Song	Carmine Gallone	Albert Préjean, Jim Gérald	Comedy	
The Sandman	André Hugon	Jean Toulout, Jean Worms, Alexandre Mihalesco	Drama	
Sergeant X	Vladimir Strizhevsky	Ivan Mozzhukhin, Suzy Vernon, Jean Angelo	Drama	
Shadows of Paris	Maurice Sollin	Dolly Davis, Ksenia Kuprina	Drama	
Should We Wed Them?	Pierre Billon, Carl Lamac	Anny Ondra, Lucien Baroux	Comedy	
A Son from America	Carmine Gallone	Albert Préjean, Annabella	Comedy drama	Co-production with Hungary
Southern Cross	André Hugon	Charles de Rochefort, Suzanne Christy	Drama	
A Star Disappears	Robert Villers	Suzy Vernon, Constant Rémy	Comedy	
Student's Hotel	Viktor Tourjansky	Lisette Lanvin, Raymond Galle	Drama	
Suzanne	Léo Joannon, Raymond Rouleau	Pauline Carton, Louis Florencie	Drama	
Take Care of Amelie	Marguerite Viel, Richard Weisbach	Aimé Clariond, Arthur Devère	Comedy	
That Scoundrel Morin	Georges Lacombe	Jacques Baumer, Rosine Deréan, José Noguéro	Comedy	
A Telephone Call	Georges Lacombe	Jean Weber, Colette Darfeuil, Jeanne Boitel	Comedy	
The Three Musketeers	Henri Diamant-Berger	Blanche Montel, Maurice Escande	Adventure	
To Live Happily	Claudio de la Torre	Noël-Noël, Suzet Maïs, Pierre Etchepare	Comedy	
To the Polls, Citizens	Jean Hémard	Claude Dauphin, Léon Belières	Comedy	
Tossing Ship	Jean de La Cour	Max Dearly, Pierre Magnier	Musical	
Transit Camp	Max Reichmann	Ivan Koval-Samborsky, Meg Lemonnier	Drama	Co-production with Germany
The Triangle of Fire	Edmond T. Gréville, Johannes Guter	Jean Angelo, André Roanne	Crime	Co-production with Germany
Under the Leather Helmet	Albert de Courville	Pierre Richard-Willm, Gina Manès	Drama	Co-production with the United Kingdom
Vampyr	Carl Theodor Dreyer	Julian West, Maurice Schutz, Jan Hieronimko, Sybille Schmitz	Horror	Co-production with Germany
Vive la classe	Maurice Cammage	Fernandel, Mireille Balin	Comedy	
The Wandering Beast	Marco de Gastyne	Gabriel Gabrio, Maurice Maillot	Drama	
The Woman Dressed As a Man	Augusto Genina	Carmen Boni, Armand Bernard	Comedy	
The Wonderful Day	Yves Mirande, Robert Wyler	Frédéric Duvallès, Florelle	Comedy	
Wooden Crosses	Raymond Bernard	Pierre Blanchar, Raymond Aimos, Gabriel Gabrio	War	
The Yellow Dog	Jean Tarride	Abel Tarride, Rosine Deréan	Crime	
You Will Be a Duchess	René Guissart	Marie Glory, Fernand Gravey	Romantic comedy	

== See also ==
- 1932 in France
