= Charles Dechamps =

French actor (1882–1959)

- Born: Émile Charles François Dechamps; 13 September 1882; 10th arrondissement of Paris
- Died: 25 September 1959 (aged 77); 15th arrondissement of Paris

Charles Dechamps (13 September 1882 – 25 September 1959) was a French stage and film actor. He married the comedian Fernande Albany on 19 November 1925. He died in 1959, and was buried at cimetière du Père-Lachaise.

== Filmography ==
- 1909: Les Petits pieds de Berthe
- 1909: Fourberie conjugale
- 1909: Mariage à l'espagnole by Michel Carré
- 1910: Au temps des grisettes by Georges Denola
- 1911: L'Anniversaire de Mademoiselle Félicité by Georges Denola
- 1911: Clémence d'Isabeau, la princesse d'Héristal by Georges Denola
- 1911: Frisette, blanchisseuse de fin by Georges Denola
- 1911: Mimi Pinson by Georges Denola
- 1911: Galathée by Georges Denola
- 1911: Moderne Galathée by Daniel Riche
- 1911: L'Homme de peine by Michel Carré
- 1911: Deux Filles d'Espagne by Maurice Denécheau
- 1912: Nini l'assommeur by Maurice Bernhardt
- 1912: La Bohème by Albert Capellani
- 1912: La Sonate du diable by René Leprince
- 1912: La Porteuse de pain by Georges Denola
- 1913: L'Usurier by Camille de Morlhon
- 1914: Le Nid by Léon Poirier
- 1918: La Faute d'orthographe by Jacques Feyder
- 1918: Frères de Maurice Remon
- 1923: The Bread Peddler by René Le Somptier
- 1923: Château historique by Henri Desfontaines
- 1931: Caught in the Act by Hanns Schwarz and Georges Tréville
- 1932: Companion Wanted by Joe May
- 1932: Pour un sou d'amour by Jean Grémillon
- 1932: That Scoundrel Morin by Georges Lacombe
- 1932: Un peu d'amour by Hans Steinhoff
- 1933: Gonzague ou l'accordeur (short film) by Jean Grémillon
- 1933: The Fakir of the Grand Hotel by Pierre Billon
- 1933: Ève cherche un père by Mario Bonnard
- 1933: Three Lucky Fools by Mario Bonnard
- 1933: Toi que j'adore by Geza von Bolvary and Albert Valentin
- 1933: All for Love by Joe May and Henri-Georges Clouzot
- 1933: Trois hommes en habit by Mario Bonnard
- 1933: Vive la compagnie by Claude Moulins
- 1934: If I Were Boss by Richard Pottier : Sainclair
- 1934: A Train in the Night by René Hervil
- 1934: Le Coup du parapluie (short film) by Victor de Fast
- 1935: Adémaï au Moyen Âge by Jean de Marguenat
- 1935: J'aime toutes les femmes by Karel Lamač
- 1935: Mon cœur t'appelle by Carmine Gallone and Serge Veber
- 1935: A Rare Bird by Richard Pottier
- 1936: Monsieur est saisi (short film) by René Sti
- 1936: Cœur de gueux by Jean Epstein
- 1936: Une gueule en or by Pierre Colombier
- 1936: Monsieur Sans-Gêne by Karl Anton
- 1936: The New Testament by Sacha Guitry and Alexandre Ryder
- 1936: Œil de lynx, détective by Pierre-Jean Ducis
- 1936: Pantins d'amour by Walter Kapps
- 1936: Passé à vendre by René Pujol
- 1936: Les Pattes de mouche by Jean Grémillon
- 1936: La Reine des resquilleuses by Max Glass and marco de Gastyne
- 1937: Chaste Susanne by André Berthomieu : Pomerel
- 1937 A Picnic on the Grass by Marcel Cravenne
- 1937: Hercule by Alexander Esway
- 1937: The Postmaster's Daughter by Victor Tourjansky
- 1937: The Secrets of the Red Sea by Richard Pottier
- 1938: Barnabé by Alexander Esway
- 1938: Un fichu métier by Pierre-Jean Ducis
- 1938: Le Père Lebonnard by Jean de Limur
- 1938: Un de la Canebière by René Pujol
- 1939: Beating Heart by Henri Decoin
- 1941: The Acrobat by Jean Boyer
- 1945: Lady on a Train by Charles David
- 1946: Loves, Delights and Organs by André Berthomieu
- 1946: Les Beaux Jours du roi Murat by Théophile Pathé
- 1946: Le chanteur inconnu by André Cayatte
- 1947: La Révoltée by Marcel L'Herbier
- 1948: Clochemerle by Pierre Chenal
- 1948: Mort ou vif by Jean Tedesco
- 1948: Les amants de Vérone by André Cayatte
- 1949: My Aunt from Honfleur de René Jayet
- 1949: Le Furet de Raymond Leboursier
- 1949: Keep an Eye on Amelia by Claude Autant-Lara
- 1949: Blonde by Maurice Cam
- 1950: Rome-express by Christian Stengel
- 1950: Dakota 308 by Jacques Daniel Norman
- 1950: Adele's Gift by Émile Couzinet
- 1950: Et moi j'te dis qu'elle t'a fait d'l'œil by Maurice Gleize
- 1950: Les Maîtres nageurs by Henry Lepage
- 1951: Good Enough to Eat by Raoul André
- 1951: Chacun son tour by André Berthomieu
- 1952: The Call of Destiny by Georges Lacombe
- 1952 The Case Against X by Richard Pottier
- 1952: Innocents in Paris by Gordon Parry
- 1953: Le Blé en herbe by Claude Autant-Lara
- 1954: Tourments by Jacques Daniel-Norman
- 1954: Pas de souris dans le bizness by Henry Lepage
- 1954: Le Fils de Caroline Chérie by Jean-Devaivre
- 1955: Mon curé champion du régiment by Émile Couzinet
- 1956: Sous le ciel de Provence or Quatre pas dans les nuages by Mario Soldati

== Theatre ==
- 1887: La Tosca by Victorien Sardou, Théâtre de la Porte-Saint-Martin
- 1902: Théodora by Victorien Sardou, Théâtre Sarah-Bernhardt
- 1902: La Samaritaine by Edmond Rostand, Théâtre Sarah-Bernhardt
- 1902: L'Aiglon by Edmond Rostand, Théâtre Sarah-Bernhardt
- 1902: Théroigne de Méricourt by Paul Hervieu, théâtre Sarah-Bernhardt
- 1906: Mademoiselle Josette, ma femme by Robert Charvay and Paul Gavault, Théâtre du Gymnase
- 1907: Terre d'épouvante by André de Lorde and Eugène Morel, Théâtre Antoine
- 1908: Le Scandale de Monte-Carlo by Sacha Guitry, théâtre du Gymnase
- 1908: Le Passe-partout by Georges Thurner, théâtre du Gymnase
- 1909: La Rampe by André Pascal, Théâtre du Gymnase
- 1909: La Petite Chocolatière by Paul Gavault, Théâtre de la Renaissance
- 1909: Pierre et Thérèse by Marcel Prévost, Yhéâtre du Gymnase
- 1910: La Fugitive by André Picard, Comédie-Française
- 1912: L'Idée de Françoise by Paul Gavault, Théâtre de la Renaissance
- 1913: Les Femmes savantes by Molière, directed by Léon Poirier and Henri Beaulieu, Comédie des Champs-Élysées
- 1913: Le Veau d'or by Lucien Gleize, directed by Henri Beaulieu, Comédie des Champs-Élysées
- 1927: Le Sexe fort by Tristan Bernard, théâtre Michel
- 1929: L'Ascension de Virginie by Maurice Donnay and Lucien Descaves, Théâtre de la Michodière
- 1929: La Rolls Royce by Mario Duliani and Jean Refroigney, directed by Harry Baur, Théâtre des Mathurins
- 1930: Browning by Mario Duliani and Jean Refroigney, Théâtre des Mathurins (+ mise en scène)
- 1934: Le Nouveau Testament by Sacha Guitry, directed by the author, Théâtre de la Madeleine
- 1949: Les Maîtres Nageurs by Marcel Franck, directed by Émile Dars, Théâtre de la Potinière
- 1950: Pourquoi pas moi by Armand Salacrou, directed by Jacques Dumesnil, Théâtre Édouard VII
- 1951: Le Sabre de mon père by Roger Vitrac, directed by Pierre Dux, Théâtre de Paris
- 1952: Robinson by Jules Supervielle, directed by Jean Le Poulain, Théâtre de l'Œuvre
- 1952: Tartempion by Marcel E. Grancher and Frédéric Dard, directed by Pierre Valde, Théâtre des Noctambules

== Bibliography ==
- Raymond Chirat, Olivier Barrot, Les Excentriques du cinéma français : 1929-1958, Paris, éditions H. Veyrier, 1983, p. 215. ISBN 978-2851993045
