= A Picnic on the Grass =

1937 film

- Directed by: Marcel Cravenne
- Written by: André-Paul Antoine
- Based on: A Picnic on the Grass by André Birabeau
- Produced by: Roger Richebé
- Starring: Gaby Morlay; Jules Berry; Josseline Gaël
- Cinematography: Louis Née; Armand Thirard
- Edited by: Jean Mamy
- Music by: Georges Auric
- Production company: Société des Films Roger Richebé
- Distributed by: Paris Cinéma Location
- Release date: 9 December 1937
- Running time: 100 minutes
- Country: France
- Language: French

A Picnic on the Grass (French: Un déjeuner de soleil) is a 1937 French comedy film directed by Marcel Cravenne and starring Gaby Morlay, Jules Berry and Josseline Gaël. It was based on a 1926 play of the same title by André Birabeau. The film's sets were designed by the art director Jean d'Eaubonne. The play had previously been made into the 1927 American silent film Breakfast at Sunrise and was later adapted into the 1939 Italian film At Your Orders, Madame.

== Cast ==
- Gaby Morlay as Manon Watteau
- Jules Berry as Pierre Haguet
- Josseline Gaël as Evelyne
- Jacques Baumer as Fleury-Vallée
- Marcelle Praince as La mère
- Charles Dechamps as Vernisset
- Henry Bonvallet as Maître Baron
- Léonce Corne as Le maître d'hôtel
- Marcelle Monthil as Ginette
- Claire Olivier as La concierge de Pierre
- Robert Ozanne as Julien, le barman
- Henri Crémieux as Un placier
- Marguerite de Morlaye as La notairesse
- Maurice Devienne as Un invité chez
- Liliane Lesaffre as Un cliente de l'hôte
- Louis Vonelly as Un joueur

== Bibliography ==
- Bessy, Maurice & Chirat, Raymond. Histoire du cinéma français: 1935-1939. Pygmalion, 1986.
- Crisp, Colin. Genre, Myth and Convention in the French Cinema, 1929-1939. Indiana University Press, 2002.
- Rège, Philippe. Encyclopedia of French Film Directors, Volume 1. Scarecrow Press, 2009.
