= Francell =

Francell is a surname. Notable people with the surname include:

- Fernand Francell (1880–1966), French opera singer and actor
- Jacqueline Francell (1908–1962), French singer and actress
