= The Woman I Love (1937 film) =

1937 film by Anatole Litvak

- Theatrical release poster
- Directed by: Anatole Litvak
- Written by: Mary Borden; Frank Wead; Sascha Lawrence
- Based on: The Crew by Joseph Kessel
- Produced by: Albert Lewis
- Starring: Paul Muni; Miriam Hopkins; Louis Hayward
- Cinematography: Charles Rosher
- Edited by: Henri Rust
- Music by: Roy Webb (director); Arthur Honegger (score); Maurice Thiriet (score)
- Production company: RKO Radio Pictures
- Distributed by: RKO Radio Pictures
- Release date: April 23, 1937
- Running time: 85 minutes
- Country: United States
- Language: English
- Budget: $725,000
- Box office: $783,000

The Woman I Love (also known as Escadrille and The Woman Between) is a 1937 American drama film about a romantic triangle involving two World War I fighter pilots and the wife of one of them. It stars Paul Muni, Miriam Hopkins, and Louis Hayward. Anatole Litvak's Hollywood directorial debut was a remake of his French film The Crew, which was, in turn, based on Joseph Kessel's 1923 novel of the same name.

== Plot ==
In World War I France, Lt. Jean Herbillion is watching a musical in Paris, and a lady who calls herself Denise sits next to him. The play is interrupted by an air raid and the theatre is evacuated, but Denise is knocked out in the audience panic, and Jean stays with her in the orchestra pit until she comes to. They spend the evening together, where he reveals he is hours away from joining a squadron. She agrees to meet him at his morning train, and as they exchange mailing addresses, she cautions him to mail her by General Delivery as she claims to be moving, and when he announces his division, she seems to recognize it but does not let on to him.

Upon arriving to the squadron, Jean finds himself among generally upbeat, patriotic men eager to fly. But their primary fighter pilot Lt. Claude Maury has a bad reputation, flying off on "lone wolf" missions. More importantly, Claude continually returns to base with his air observers/gunners killed or wounded. Others believe he is either "jinxed" or dangerous, and only Jean volunteers to fly with him as his observer/gunner. The two men become very close, and tell each other of the women they are fighting to stay alive for.

When Jean is given leave to return to Paris, Claude gives him a letter to convey to his wife. Upon going to the address, he discovers Denise is in fact Jean's wife Helene. She tries to explain that she feels loyalty to her husband but his near-suicidal behavior in combat has come between them, and she loves Jean more. Nevertheless, he is horrified at the prospect of having potentially betrayed his best friend and superior officer, and cuts off contact with her upon returning. In turn, he behaves more aloof with Claude, who has otherwise become more congenial because of their friendship.

Helene learns of the squadron will have an extended stay in a nearby city, and tells Claude but not Jean of her plan to visit. Jean attempts to fabricate a relationship with a saloon girl, Florence, and a fight with her previous boyfriend forces Claude to discipline him. He tries to avoid Helene during her visit, but they meet in a church and affirm their passion. Helene learns the squadron is unexpectedly summoned for a battle, and the high command seeks a volunteer to stay in Paris to train more pilots. She informs Jean of the offer and he volunteers, which arouses Claude's suspicions since he only told her about the offer. However, their superior Captain Thellis talks Jean out of it, warning him the other men will think him a coward, and he stays with the squad.

On the eve of a major dogfight, Claude confronts Jean and asks him if he has had an affair with his wife, but he continues to deny it. They go up in their plane and take down several enemy fighters together, but upon landing, Jean is killed and Claude badly wounded. Claude finds a signed photo of Jean and Helene together that he, in his dying moments, was trying to tear up. Claude finishes ripping the photo.

In hospital, Helene ministers to a recuperating Claude, when they are visited by Jean's young brother Georges. The boy begs to know the details of Jean's last moments, and Claude tells him that he died asking for his mother and Georges. When the boy leaves, Claude admits that he lied, saying Jean called out for his true love, Denise, and contemplates what hurt she must be feeling. Helene tries to hold back her emotions as she nurses him back to health.

== Cast ==
- Paul Muni as Lieutenant Claude Maury
- Miriam Hopkins as Madame Helene Maury
- Louis Hayward as Lieutenant Jean Herbillion
- Colin Clive as Captain Thelis
- Minor Watson as Deschamps
- Elisabeth Risdon as Madame Herbillion
- Paul Guilfoyle as Bertier
- Wally Albright as Georges
- Mady Christians as Florence
- Alec Craig as Doctor
- Owen Davis, Jr. as Mezziores
- Sterling Holloway as Duprez
- Adrian Morris as Marbot

== Production ==
Principal photography for The Woman I Love began on December 12, 1936 with Anatole Litvak at the helm. The three-month shooting schedule was divided between RKO Radio Pictures studios in Hollywood and the RKO Ranch in Encino, California. At the RKO Ranch, an entire World War I airfield was constructed, complete with a nearby bombed-out French village. Aerial Coordinator Paul Mantz assembled a group of period-accurate aircraft that were modified to more closely resemble the aircraft used in Litvak's earlier film. Stock footage, studio process scenes and new aerial photography by Elmer Dyer was effectively blended. Filming wrapped at the end of February 1937. (Note: Mantz and fellow stunt pilot Frank Clarke flew contemporary Stearman C3 and Curtiss Fledgling aircraft, modified to look like French World War I biplanes.) This was the last role for Colin Clive, who died less than two months after the release of the film.

== Reception ==
The Woman I Love generally received good reviews but was unable to generate much interest at the box-office, with a reported loss of $266,000. Frank Nugent in his review for The New York Times called the film "... a rather turgid wartime triangle ... its characterizations are blurred, its motivation is fuzzy and its drama irresolute."
