= Runaway Ladies =

1938 film

- Trade show advertisement
- Directed by: Jean de Limur
- Written by: Georges Lampin
- Based on: Le voyage imprévu by Tristan Bernard
- Produced by: Simon Barstoff; M. Haworth Booth; Adolf Forter
- Starring: Betty Stockfeld; Claude Dauphin; Hugh Wakefield
- Music by: Paul Segnitz; Jean Wiener
- Production company: International Players
- Distributed by: Exclusive Films
- Release date: June 1938
- Running time: 56 minutes
- Country: United Kingdom
- Language: English

Runaway Ladies (also known as The Unexpected Journey) is a 1938 British comedy film directed by Jean de Limur and starring Betty Stockfeld, Claude Dauphin and Hugh Wakefield. It was written by Georges Lampin and made as a quota quickie at Elstree Studios in 1935. It is an English-language remake of the French film The Slipper Episode (Le voyage imprévu, 1935), also directed by de Limur with a largely identical cast.

== Preservation status ==
The British Film Institute National Archive holds no stills or ephemera, and no film or video materials.

== Synopsis ==
Lady Ramsden, at home in Switzerland, finds that she has left a bedroom slipper in her lover André Chabrolles' house in Paris. She asks her friend Betty to retrieve the shoe. Betty does so, and her admirer Georges drives her to Switzerland where various farcial adventures ensue.

== Cast ==
- Betty Stockfeld as Betty
- Roger Tréville as Georges
- Claude Dauphin as André Chabrolles
- Edna Searle as Lady Ramsden
- Hugh Wakefield as Lord Ramsden
- Raymond Cordy as fisherman
- Jean Dax as hotel manager
- Émile Genevois as hotel groom
- Robert Rietty as boy

== Reception ==
The Monthly Film Bulletin wrote: "This farce might have raised an occasional laugh if it had moved at a less sluggish pace. It would also have been more convincing if the French drivers of French cars in Paris had not driven consistently on the left-hand side of the road, and if Betty Stockfield had not asked a French woman for the use of a telephone in French, and thanked her for the same in German. The settings are in places quite good, and the photography is average. The only actor who seems happy in his part is Raymond Cordy as the angler. On the whole a very tame comedy."

Kine Weekly wrote: "It is a slight bedroom farce concerning the search for a slipper a lady had left in a gentleman's bedroom, and is somewhat confusing in its issues and scrappy in continuity. ... The director has neglected characterisation and fails to interest one at all deeply in the fates of the various characters."

The Daily Film Renter wrote: "Amusing light comedy of marital infidelity, with neatly introduced romantic side issue. Story brings in familiar misunderstandings and complications, while authentic French and Swiss locations provide attractive backgrounds. Quite well acted by English cast, subject makes agreeable second feature popular halls."
