= Noguero =

Spanish surname

Noguero is a Spanish surname.

== Notable people ==
Notable people with the surname include:

- José Noguero, French actor of Spanish ancestry
- Lorenzo López Noguero, Spanish anarchist
- Jesús Noguero, Spanish actor
- Manuel Noguero, Spanish actor
