= Le Scandale de Monte-Carlo =

Le Scandale de Monte-Carlo is a comedy in three acts by French dramatist and playwright Sacha Guitry, premiered at théâtre du Gymnase on 22 April 1908.

== Original cast ==
- Armand Davégna: Abel Tarride
- Paul Hebert: Charles Dechamps
- Lucien Aveze: Jean Dax
- The commissaire: Edmond Bauer
- Monsieur Alexis: Chambaz
- Henri : Paul-Edmond
- Countesse Davégna: Marie Magnier
- Rosette Vignon: Alice Clairville
- Marguerite Davégna: Marguerite Montavon
- Céline: Claudia
- Madame X: Lydia Buck
- The maid: De Massol
