= The Crew (novel) =

1923 novel

- Author: Joseph Kessel
- Language: French
- Genre: War drama
- Publication date: 1923
- Publication place: France
- Media type: Print
- Pages: 223

The Crew (French: L'Équipage) is a 1923 war novel by the French writer Joseph Kessel. It is set during the First World War, focusing on the crew of a two-man reconnaissance plane whose pilot is in love with the wife of the observer. It was bestseller and later secured Kessel membership of the Académie Française.

== Film adaptations ==
It has been adapted into films on three occasions:

- The Crew, a 1928 French silent film directed by Maurice Tourneur and starring Jean Dax, Camille Bert and Claire de Lorez
- The Crew, a 1935 French sound film directed by Anatole Litvak and starring Annabella, Charles Vanel and Jean-Pierre Aumont
- The Woman I Love, a 1937 American remake directed by Litvak and starring Paul Muni, Miriam Hopkins and Louis Hayward

== Bibliography ==
- Goble, Alan. The Complete Index to Literary Sources in Film. Walter de Gruyter, 1999.
- Harvey, Arnold D. A Muse of Fire: Literature, Art and War. A&C Black, 1998.
- Van Creveld, Martin. The Age of Airpower . Hachette UK, 2011.
