= Return at Dawn =

- Theatrical poster
- Directed by: Henri Decoin
- Written by: Henri Decoin; Pierre Wolff; Vicki Baum (short story)
- Produced by: Joseph Bercholz
- Starring: Danielle Darrieux; Pierre Dux; Jacques Dumesnil
- Cinematography: Léonce-Henri Burel
- Edited by: Marguerite Beaugé
- Music by: Paul Misraki
- Production company: Union des Distributeurs Indépendants
- Release dates: 18 November 1936; 31 July 1947 (New York)
- Running time: 90 minutes
- Country: France
- Language: French

Return at Dawn, also known as She Returned at Dawn (French: Retour à l'aube), is a 1938 French drama film starring Danielle Darrieux. The film was directed by Henri Decoin, who cowrote the screenplay with Pierre Wolff, based on a short story by Vicki Baum. The music score is by Paul Misraki. The sets were designed by the art director Serge Piménoff. It was filmed in Zichyújfalu and Budapest, Hungary.

== Plot ==
A stationmaster's wife must travel to Budapest to claim an inheritance, but arrives late for her train and experiences many adventures during the night.

== Cast ==
- Danielle Darrieux as Anita Ammer
- Pierre Dux as Karl Ammer
- Jacques Dumesnil as Dick Farmer aka 'Keith'
- Pierre Mingand as Osten
- Raymond Cordy as Pali
- Samson Fainsilber as L'inspecteur Veber
- Marcel Delaître as Le commissaire
- Thérèse Dorny as La directrice de la maison de couture
- Louis Florencie
- Léonce Corne as Un ami d'Osten
- André Numès Fils as Le notaire
- Jacques Henley as Un ami d'Osten
- Robert Ozanne as Un voyageur
- Yvonne Yma
- Marcelle Barry
- Amy Collin
- Albert Brouett as Voyageur à la couronne
- Marcel Pérès as Le pharmacien
- Pierre de Ramey as Un ami d'Osten

== Reception ==
The film premiered in New York on July 31, 1947 as She Returned at Dawn. Critic Bosley Crowther of The New York Times wrote: "Do you remember Danielle Darrieux? ... [I]f she appears little changed, the explanation is simple. 'She Returned at Dawn' is a pre-war film. More than that, it is naive and foolish ... Except for the glimpse of pre-war Darrieux, there is little to see in this film. It is equipped with English sub-titles, which makes little difference either way."
