= The Crew (1935 film) =

1935 film

- Directed by: Anatole Litvak
- Written by: Joseph Kessel; Anatole Litvak
- Based on: The Crew by Joseph Kessel
- Produced by: Bernard Natan; Emile Natan; Simon Schiffrin
- Starring: Annabella; Charles Vanel; Jean Murat; Jean-Pierre Aumont
- Cinematography: Armand Thirard
- Edited by: Henri Rust
- Music by: Arthur Honegger; Jean Wiener
- Production company: Pathé-Natan
- Distributed by: Pathé Consortium Cinéma
- Release date: 22 October 1935
- Running time: 111 minutes
- Country: France
- Language: French

The Crew (French: L'Équipage) is a 1935 French war drama film directed by Anatole Litvak and starring Annabella, Charles Vanel, Jean Murat and Jean-Pierre Aumont. It was shot at the Joinville Studios in Paris and on location at an airfield in Mourmelon-le-Petit. The film's sets were designed by the art directors Lucien Aguettand and Lucien Carré. It is also known by the alternative title Flight Into Darkness.

The film is based on the 1923 novel of the same title by Joseph Kessel, which had previously been made into a 1928 French silent film The Crew. Litvak remade his own film as The Woman I Love for his first Hollywood production in 1937.

== Synopsis ==
In 1918 during the First World War, a French pilot has an affair with a married woman without realising that she is the wife of one of his colleagues from his new squadron.

== Cast ==
- Annabella as Hélène / Denise
- Charles Vanel as Le lieutenant Maury
- Jean Murat as Le capitaine Thélis
- Jean-Pierre Aumont as L'aspirant Jean Herbillon
- Daniel Mendaille as Deschamps
- Raymond Cordy as Mathieu - l'ordonnance
- Suzanne Desprès as Madame Herbillon
- Alexandre Rignault as L'amant de la patronne
- Pierre Labry as Marbot
- Geo Laby as Mézières
- René Bergeron as Fortin
- Jean Heuzé as Berthier
- Roland Toutain as Narbonne - un aviateur
- Yves Forget as Un officier
- Serge Grave as Georges Herbillon
- André Lannes as Officier
- Guy Sloux as Michel
- Jean Davy as Brulard
- Claire Franconnay as La patronne du beuglant
- Raymond Aimos as Le crieur de journaux
- Paul Amiot as Le soldat du 54e
- Vera Baranovskaya as La veuve
- Viviane Romance as Une girl

== Bibliography ==
- Capua, Michelangelo. Anatole Litvak: The Life and Films. McFarland, 2015.
- Goble, Alan. The Complete Index to Literary Sources in Film. Walter de Gruyter, 1999.
- Crisp, Colin. French Cinema—A Critical Filmography: Volume 1, 1929-1939. Indiana University Press, 2015.
- Rège, Philippe. Encyclopedia of French Film Directors, Volume 1. Scarecrow Press, 2009.
