= Sylvette Fillacier =

French actress

- Born: 9 March 1895; Mascara, Oran; French Algeria
- Died: 20 September 1960 (aged 65); Paris, France
- Occupation: Actress
- Years active: 1920-1938 (film)

Sylvette Fillacier (1895-1960) was a French Algerian film actress of the silent and early sound eras. She was married to the journalist Pierre Lazareff during the 1930s.

== Selected filmography ==
- La rue du pavé d'amour (1924)
- Paris (1924)
- Montmartre (1931)
- My Cousin from Warsaw (1931)
- Sailor's Song (1932)
- Student's Hotel (1932)
- The Yellow Dog (1932)
- La Maternelle (1933)
- Itto (1934)
- Divine (1935)
- The Lafarge Case (1938)

== Bibliography ==
- Campbell, Russell. Marked Women: Prostitutes and Prostitution in the Cinema. University of Wisconsin Press, 5 Apr 2006.
- Goble, Alan. The Complete Index to Literary Sources in Film. Walter de Gruyter, 1999.
