= The Unknown Singer (1931 film) =

1931 film directed by Viktor Tourjansky

- Directed by: Viktor Tourjansky
- Written by: Jean-Henri Blanchon; Henri-Georges Clouzot; Henri Decoin; Henri Diamant-Berger; Viktor Tourjansky; Pierre-Gilles Veber
- Produced by: Adolphe Osso; Noë Bloch
- Starring: Lucien Muratore; Simone Cerdan; Jim Gérald
- Cinematography: Curt Courant
- Edited by: Marguerite Beaugé
- Music by: René Sylviano
- Production company: Les Films Osso
- Distributed by: Pathé Consortium Cinéma
- Release date: 12 December 1931
- Running time: 95 minutes
- Country: France
- Language: French

The Unknown Singer (French: Le chanteur inconnu) is a 1931 French drama film directed by Viktor Tourjansky and starring Lucien Muratore, Simone Cerdan and Jim Gérald. The film's sets were designed by the art director Serge Piménoff.

== Synopsis ==
A singer long thought dead has in fact been in Russia suffering from memory loss. He returns home to France, surprising both the man who had plotted to kill him and his wife who has remained loyal to him.

== Cast ==
- Lucien Muratore as Claude Ferval
- Simone Cerdan as Hélène Corbigny
- Jim Gérald as Ernest
- Ghislaine Bru as Beggar woman
- Pedro Elviro
- Denise Guilloux as Monique
- Jean-Max as Jacques
- Alexandre Mathillon as Baliveau
- Ernest Mezigues
- Serge Piménoff as Fireman
- Henry Prestat as Riga
- Simone Simon as Pierette

== Bibliography ==
- Christopher Lloyd. Henri-Georges Clouzot. Manchester University Press, 2007.
