= The Call of Silence =

1936 film

- Directed by: Léon Poirier
- Written by: Léon Poirier
- Produced by: Léon Poirier
- Starring: Jean Yonnel; Pierre de Guingand; Jacqueline Francell
- Cinematography: Goudard Georges; Georges Million
- Music by: Claude Delvincourt
- Production company: Societé Artistique Commerciale et Industrielle
- Distributed by: Compagnie Industrielle Cinématographique
- Release date: 1 May 1936
- Running time: 109 minutes
- Country: France
- Language: French

The Call of Silence, also screened as The Call (French: L'Appel du Silence), is a 1936 French drama film directed by Léon Poirier and starring Jean Yonnel, Pierre de Guingand and Jacqueline Francell. It is a biography based on the life of the Catholic missionary Charles de Foucauld.

== Plot ==
Charles de Foucauld travels the Sahara as a missionary. He is killed by local bandits.

== Cast ==
- Jean Yonnel as Charles de Foucauld
- Pierre de Guingand as Général Laperrine
- Jacqueline Francell as Mademoiselle X
- Alice Tissot as La femme du notaire
- Suzanne Bianchetti as La femme du monde
- Pierre Juvenet as Le colonel
- Thomy Bourdelle as Un général
- André Nox
- Pierre Nay as Le marquis de Morès
- Fred Pasquali
- Auguste Bovério
- Alexandre Mihalesco
- Fernand Francell
- Jeanne Marie-Laurent
- Georges Cahuzac
- Jean Kolb
- Henri Defreyn
- Maurice Schutz
- Victor Vina
- Émile Saint-Ober
- Maurice de Canonge
- Pierre Darteuil
- Pierre Athon as Lieutenant de Guissart
- René Bergeron
- Jean Buquet]
- Mireille Monard as Pianist
- Francia Seguy

== Bibliography ==
- Andrews, Dudley. Mists of Regret: Culture and Sensibility in Classic French Film. Princeton University Press, 1995.
