= Too Young for Love (1953 film) =

- Directed by: Lionello De Felice
- Written by: André Birabeau (play); Franco Brusati; Lionello De Felice; Vittorio Nino Novarese
- Produced by: Niccolò Theodoli
- Starring: Aldo Fabrizi; Marina Vlady; Fernand Gravey
- Cinematography: Mario Montuori
- Edited by: Mario Serandrei
- Music by: Mario Nascimbene
- Production companies: Cormoran Film; Industrie Cinematografiche Sociali
- Distributed by: Diana Film
- Release date: 22 August 1953
- Running time: 85 minutes
- Countries: France; Italy
- Language: Italian

Too Young for Love AKA The Age of Indiscretion (Italian: L'età dell'amore) is a 1953 French-Italian comedy drama film directed by Lionello De Felice and starring Aldo Fabrizi, Marina Vlady and Fernand Gravey. Some of the film was shot on location in Castellana Grotte.

The film adapts a play, Dame Nature, by André Birabeau.

== Synopsis ==
In a small provincial Italian town, a fifteen-year-old boy meets and falls in love with a girl.

== Partial cast ==
- Aldo Fabrizi as Coletti, padre di Annette
- Marina Vlady as Annette
- Pierre-Michel Beck as Andrea
- Fernand Gravey as Padre di Andrea, presidente del tribunale
- Vittorio Sanipoli as Sergio
- Nando Bruno as Commisario
- Lauro Gazzolo as Vicepresidente del tribunale
- Lola Braccini as Zia di Sergio
- Xenia Valderi as Madre di Andrea
- Massimo Pianforini as Anselmo

== Bibliography ==
- Adriano Pintaldi. Aldo Fabrizi: arte romana : al cinema e in cucina. Maggioli Editore, 2012.
