= La Possession (film) =

1929 film

- Directed by: Léonce Perret
- Written by: Henry Bataille (play)
- Starring: Francesca Bertini; Pierre de Guingand
- Release date: 24 May 1929
- Country: France
- Language: French

La Possession [lit. Possession] is a 1929 French film directed by Léonce Perret. The film's sets were designed by the art director Lucien Jaquelux. La Possession is based on the play of the same name by Henry Bataille.

== Cast ==
- Francesca Bertini - Jessie Cordier
- Pierre de Guingand - Marquis Serge de Châvres
- Gil Roland - Max Brignon
- Jeanne Aubert - Passerose
- André Nox - Duc de Chavres
- Marguerite de Morlaye - Bianca

== Production ==
The film features Jeanne Aubert in one of her first film roles.

== Reception ==
A German contemporary brief review in Paimann's Filmlisten concluded: "The subject, conventional and somewhat broad, is not staged without care. The presentation, especially in the introductory scenes, would have required a certain dampening. Presentation and photography are good. — Overall qualification: Average film."

In his 2006 book about Perret, Daniel Taillé found the film technically brilliant and carefully produced but not very original in terms of plot.
