= My Friend Victor =

1931 film

- Directed by: André Berthomieu
- Written by: Georges Dolley (novel); André Berthomieu
- Produced by: Georges Dolley
- Starring: René Lefèvre; Pierre Brasseur; Simone Bourday
- Cinematography: Jean Isnard; Georges Périnal
- Edited by: Jacques Desagneaux
- Music by: René Sylviano
- Production company: Étoile-Film
- Distributed by: Étoile-Film
- Release date: 9 January 1931
- Running time: 109 minutes
- Country: France
- Language: French

My Friend Victor (French: Mon ami Victor) is a 1931 French comedy film directed by André Berthomieu and starring René Lefèvre, Pierre Brasseur and Simone Bourday. The film may have originally been made a silent and then had sound added to it.

The film's sets were designed by the art director Robert-Jules Garnier.

== Cast ==
- René Lefèvre as Victor de Fleury
- Pierre Brasseur as Edgar Flachon
- Simone Bourday as Hélène
- Gabrielle Fontan as Tante Ursule
- Alice Ael as Mme. Lambert
- Émile Garandet as M. Lambert

== Bibliography ==
- Crisp, C.G. Genre, Myth, and Convention in the French Cinema, 1929-1939. Indiana University Press, 2002.
