= Maximilienne =

French actress (1884–1978)

- Born: 28 November 1884; Paris, France
- Died: 28 August 1978 (aged 93); Nice, France
- Other name: Henriette Adeline Genty
- Occupation: Actress
- Years active: 1925-1959 (film)

Maximilienne (1884-1978) was a French stage and film actress. She appeared frequently in films, generally in supporting roles. Later in her career she played the domineering comic foil to the comedian Fernand Raynaud.

== Selected filmography ==
- The Adventures of Robert Macaire (1925)
- To the Polls, Citizens (1932)
- Our Lord's Vineyard (1932)
- Étienne (1933)
- Bastille Day (1933)
- The Surprises of Divorce (1933)
- Court Waltzes (1933)
- 600,000 Francs a Month (1933)
- The Concierge's Daughters (1934)
- Liliom (1934)
- Chourinette (1934)
- Tartarin of Tarascon (1934)
- Maria Chapdelaine (1934)
- Lovers and Thieves (1935)
- Disk 413 (1936)
- The Secrets of the Red Sea (1937)
- My Aunts and I (1937)
- The Man from Nowhere (1937)
- Prison sans barreaux (1938)
- My Priest Among the Rich (1938)
- Clodoche (1938)
- The Baker's Wife (1938)
- Shop Girls of Paris (1943)
- Picpus (1943)
- The Ménard Collection (1944)
- Rooster Heart (1946)
- Song of the Clouds (1946)
- Monsieur Vincent (1947)
- Clochemerle (1948)
- The Cupboard Was Bare (1948)
- Blonde (1950)
- The Treasure of Cantenac (1950)
- Monsieur Octave (1951)
- Music in the Head (1951)
- Adhémar (1951)
- Pardon My French (1951)
- Dans la vie tout s'arrange (1952)
- The Congress of Mother-in-Laws (1954)
- The Enigma of the Folies-Bergere (1959)

== Bibliography ==
- Crisp, Colin. French Cinema—A Critical Filmography: Volume 1, 1929–1939. Indiana University Press, 2015.
- Goble, Alan. The Complete Index to Literary Sources in Film. Walter de Gruyter, 1999.
