= 600,000 Francs a Month (1933 film) =

1933 film

- Directed by: Léo Joannon
- Written by: Jean Drault (novel); Albert Jean (play); André Mouëzy-Éon (play); René Pujol
- Produced by: Bernard Natan
- Starring: Germaine Michel; Georges Biscot; Jean Aymé
- Cinematography: Nikolai Toporkoff
- Music by: Jane Bos
- Production company: Norma Film
- Distributed by: Pathé-Natan
- Release date: 1 September 1933
- Running time: 75 minutes
- Country: France
- Language: French

600,000 Francs a Month (French: 600 000 francs par mois) is a 1933 French comedy film directed by Léo Joannon and starring Germaine Michel, Georges Biscot and Jean Aymé. It is a remake of the 1926 silent film of the same name.

== Synopsis ==
A wealthy American bets a French railway worker that he cannot spend 600,000 francs a month. All the Frenchman's attempts to win the bet are thwarted but his daughter ends up falling in love with and marrying the American.

== Cast ==
- Jean Aymé as Colchester
- Georges Biscot as Galupin
- Suzette Comte as Anna
- Louis Florencie as Bique
- Pierre de Guingand as John Durand
- Jacques Luce as Bernard
- Maximilienne as Madame Brochet
- Germaine Michel as Madame Galupin

== Bibliography ==
- Goble, Alan. The Complete Index to Literary Sources in Film. Walter de Gruyter, 1999.
