= Pierre de Guingand =

French actor (1885–1964)

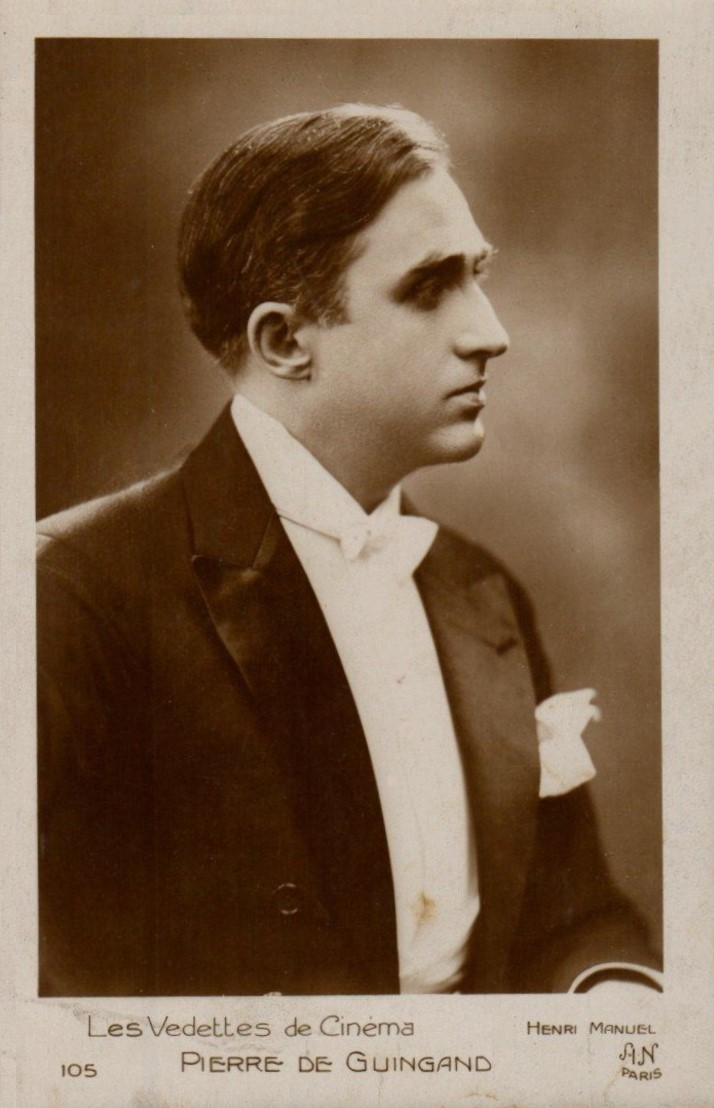
- Born: 6 June 1885; Paris, France
- Died: 10 June 1964 (aged 79); Versailles, France
- Occupation: Actor
- Years active: 1921–1952 (film)

Pierre de Guingand (June 6, 1885 - June 10, 1964) was a French stage and film actor. He portrayed Aramis in the 1921 version of The Three Musketeers and appeared in another silent swashbuckler Fanfan la Tulipe in 1925.

== Selected filmography ==
- The Three Musketeers (1921)
- Le vert galant (1924)
- Le roi de la vitesse (1924)
- Fanfan la Tulipe (1925)
- The Crew (1928)
- La Possession (1929)
- I Kiss Your Hand, Madame (1929)
- Luck (1931)
- Le Bal (1931)
- 600,000 Francs a Month (1933)
- A Weak Woman (1933)
- Chourinette (1934)
- Le Grand Jeu (1934)
- The Call of Silence (1936)
- Sarati the Terrible (1937)

== Bibliography ==
- Goble, Alan. The Complete Index to Literary Sources in Film. Walter de Gruyter, 1999.
- Klossner, Michael. The Europe of 1500-1815 on Film and Television: A Worldwide Filmography of Over 2550 Works, 1895 Through 2000. McFarland & Company, 2002.
- Rainey, Buck. Serials and Series: A World Filmography, 1912-1956. McFarland, 2015.
