= The Great Refrain =

1936 film

- Directed by: Yves Mirande; Robert Siodmak
- Written by: Yves Mirande; Arnold Lippschitz
- Produced by: Yves Mirande
- Starring: Fernand Gravey; Jacqueline Francell; Jeanne Aubert
- Cinematography: Fred Mandl; Harry Stradling Sr.
- Edited by: Jacques Grassi
- Music by: Werner R. Heymann
- Production company: Metropa Films
- Distributed by: Distribution Parisienne de Films
- Release date: 18 September 1936
- Running time: 98 minutes
- Country: France
- Language: French

The Great Refrain (French: Le grand refrain) is a 1936 French musical comedy drama film directed by Yves Mirande and Robert Siodmak and starring Fernand Gravey, Jacqueline Francell and Jeanne Aubert. The film's sets were designed by the art directors Robert Gys and Eugène Lourié.

== Cast ==
- Fernand Gravey as Charles Panard - un compositeur de talent
- Jacqueline Francell as Yvette Leclerc - la petite amie de Charles
- André Alerme as André Davin - un éditeur musical
- Jeanne Aubert as Léone de Vinci - une chanteuse vedette
- Gabriel Signoret as Le marquis de Barfleur
- Jean Tissier as Le réalisateur
- Raymond Aimos as Le clochard
- Lucien Callamand as Le barman
- Jean Dax as Le directeur du cinéma
- Cécile Lemaire as La capitaine des girls
- Madeleine Suffel as L'amie d'Yvette
- Emile Saulieu as Le domestique de Barfleur
- Roger Legris as Le secrétaire de Davin

== Bibliography ==
- Alpi, Deborah Lazaroff. Robert Siodmak: A Biography, with Critical Analyses of His Films Noirs and a Filmography of All His Works. McFarland, 1998.
- Bessy, Maurice & Chirat, Raymond. Histoire du cinéma français: 1935-1939. Pygmalion, 1986.
- Crisp, Colin. Genre, Myth and Convention in the French Cinema, 1929-1939. Indiana University Press, 2002.
- Rège, Philippe. Encyclopedia of French Film Directors, Volume 1. Scarecrow Press, 2009.
