= My Aunts and I =

- Directed by: Yvan Noé
- Written by: Jean Guignebert; Yvan Noé
- Produced by: Simon Schiffrin
- Starring: René Lefèvre; Marguerite Moreno; Jacqueline Francell
- Cinematography: Nicolas Hayer
- Edited by: Isa Elmann
- Music by: Jane Bos
- Production company: Flag Films
- Distributed by: Gray-Film
- Release date: 5 February 1937
- Running time: 90 minutes
- Country: France
- Language: French

My Aunts and I (French: Mes tantes et moi) is a 1937 French comedy film directed by Yvan Noé and starring René Lefèvre, Marguerite Moreno and Jacqueline Francell. Three Aunts keep a close watch on their nephew's romantic developments.

The film's sets were designed by the art director Marcel Magniez.

== Cast ==
- René Lefèvre as Eloi
- Marguerite Moreno as Tante Adèle
- Jacqueline Francell as Lisette
- Tramel as Jolibois
- Pierrette Caillol as Monette
- Maximilienne as Tante Julie
- Nine Assia as Simone
- Michèle Morgan as Michèle
- Peggy Bonny as Le soubrette
- Jacques Deluard as Fredo
- Maurice Mosnier as Robert
- Pierre Huchet
- Paul Asselin as Le greffier
- Alice Tissot as Tante Lucie

== Bibliography ==
- Rège, Philippe. Encyclopedia of French Film Directors, Volume 1. Scarecrow Press, 2009.
