= A Hole in the Wall (1950 film) =

- Directed by: Émile Couzinet
- Written by: Yves Mirande (play); Émile Couzinet
- Produced by: Émile Couzinet
- Starring: André Alerme; Marguerite Pierry; Raymond Galle
- Cinematography: Roger Fellous
- Edited by: Henriette Wurtzer
- Music by: Vincent Scotto
- Production company: Burgus Films
- Distributed by: SELF
- Release date: 22 February 1950
- Running time: 113 minutes
- Country: France
- Language: French

A Hole in the Wall (French: Un trou dans le mur) is a 1950 French comedy film directed by Émile Couzinet and starring André Alerme, Marguerite Pierry and Raymond Galle. It is based on a play by Yves Mirande which had previously been made into a 1930 film of the same title.

== Cast ==
- André Alerme as Campignac
- Marguerite Pierry as Artémise Corbin
- Raymond Galle as André de Kerdrec
- Jacqueline Dor as Lucie
- Nina Myral as La concierge
- Gaby Basset as La cliente
- François Joux as Anatole
- Palau as L'antiquaire
- Claudette Falco as La secrétaire

== Bibliography ==
- Goble, Alan. The Complete Index to Literary Sources in Film. Walter de Gruyter, 1999.
