= The Crew (1928 film) =

1928 film directed by Maurice Tourneur

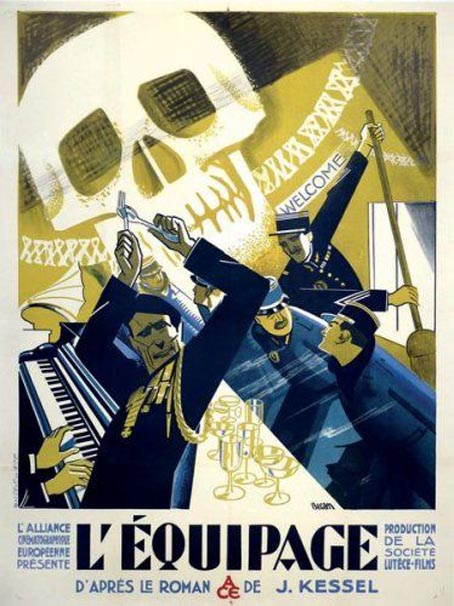
- Directed by: Maurice Tourneur
- Written by: Maurice Tourneur
- Based on: The Crew by Joseph Kessel
- Starring: Jean Dax; Camille Bert; Claire de Lorez
- Cinematography: Léonce-Henri Burel
- Production companies: Lutèce Films; Société de Générale de Films
- Distributed by: L'Alliance Cinématographique Européenne
- Release date: 23 November 1928
- Running time: 114 minutes
- Country: France
- Languages: Silent; French intertitles

The Crew (French: L'équipage) is a 1928 French silent drama film directed by Maurice Tourneur and starring Jean Dax and Camille Bert. The film's sets were designed by the art director Robert-Jules Garnier. It is based on the 1923 novel of the same title by Joseph Kessel, later remade as a 1935 sound film The Crew directed by Anatole Litvak.

== Cast ==
- Claire de Lorez as Denise Maury
- Jean Dax as Capitaine Maury
- Georges Charlia as Lieutenant Herbillon
- Camille Bert as Berthier
- Pierre de Guingand as Thélis
- Daniel Mendaille as Deschamps
- René Donnio as Mécanicien
- Robert Astruc as Neuville
- Charles Barrois as Marbot
- Belleville
- Robby Guichard as Georges
- Mitchell as Le médecin
- Henri Monteux as Mathieu
- Thèvenet

== Bibliography ==
- Waldman, Harry. Maurice Tourneur: The Life and Films. McFarland, 2001.
