= The Love of the Brothers Rott =

1929 film

- Directed by: Erich Waschneck
- Written by: Fritz Gantzer (novel Das Kreuz im Moor); Hans Rameau
- Produced by: Olga Chekhova; Robert Wüllner
- Starring: Olga Chekhova; Jean Dax; Paul Henckels; Jameson Thomas
- Cinematography: Franz Planer
- Production company: Tschechowa Film
- Distributed by: Deutsch-Russische Film-Allianz
- Release date: 17 June 1929
- Country: Germany
- Languages: Silent; German intertitles

The Love of the Brothers Rott (German: Die Liebe der Brüder Rott) is a 1929 German silent film directed by Erich Waschneck and starring Olga Chekhova, Jean Dax and Paul Henckels. It was shot at the Staaken Studios in Berlin. The film's sets were designed by the art director Andrej Andrejew.

== Cast ==
- Olga Chekhova as Theresa Donath
- Jean Dax as Donath - ihr Vater
- Paul Henckels as Clemens Rott
- Jameson Thomas as Robert
- Ekkehard Arendt as Wolf
- Alexej Bondireff as John Meyer
- Jakob Tiedtke
- Fritz Greiner
- Paul Otto
- Philipp Manning
- Hermann Krehan
- Charles Vanel

== Bibliography ==
- Hans-Michael Bock and Tim Bergfelder. The Concise Cinegraph: An Encyclopedia of German Cinema. Berghahn Books.
