= A Weak Woman =

- Directed by: Max de Vaucorbeil
- Written by: Jacques Deval (play Une faible femme)
- Produced by: Robert Kane
- Starring: Meg Lemonnier; André Luguet; Pierre de Guingand
- Music by: Ralph Erwin
- Production company: Les Studios Paramount
- Distributed by: Les Films Paramount
- Release date: 20 March 1933
- Running time: 73 minutes
- Country: France
- Language: French

A Weak Woman (French: Une faible femme) is a 1933 French comedy film directed by Max de Vaucorbeil and starring Meg Lemonnier, André Luguet and Pierre de Guingand.

== Cast ==
- Meg Lemonnier as Arlette Morand
- André Luguet as Henri Fournier
- Pierre de Guingand as Serge Armeville
- Betty Daussmond as Mme. Benoit-Lenger
- Germaine Roger as Jacqueline
- Nane Germon

== Bibliography ==
- Crisp, Colin. Genre, Myth and Convention in the French Cinema, 1929-1939. Indiana University Press, 2002.
