= The Slipper Episode =

1935 film

- Directed by: Jean de Limur
- Written by: Georges Lampin
- Based on: Le voyage imprévu by Tristan Bernard
- Produced by: Adolf Forter
- Starring: Betty Stockfeld; Roger Tréville; Claude Dauphin
- Cinematography: Fédote Bourgasoff
- Edited by: Raymond Lamy
- Music by: Roger Désormière; Paul Segnitz; Jean Wiener
- Production company: Les Films Helgal
- Distributed by: Les Films Adimon
- Release date: 3 January 1935
- Running time: 80 minutes
- Country: France
- Languages: French; Switzerland

The Slipper Episode (French: Le voyage imprévu) is a 1935 French-Swiss romantic comedy film directed by Jean de Limur and starring Betty Stockfeld, Roger Tréville and Claude Dauphin. It was based on a 1928 novel by Tristan Bernard. It was shot at the Cité Elgé in Paris and on location around Locarno and the Canton of Bern in Switzerland. The film's sets were designed by the art director Serge Piménoff. A British version Runaway Ladies was released in 1938.

The Slipper Episode was partially censored in New York state, despite being similar in content to several Hollywood films.

== Synopsis ==
A woman in Switzerland with her jealous husband remembers that she has left an item of clothing at her lover's house in Paris, which her husband is now demanding to see. She asks her friend Béatrice to pick it up and bring to her, but has a number of delays and a romantic encounter as she does so.

== Cast ==
- Betty Stockfeld as Béatrice
- Roger Tréville as Georges
- Claude Dauphin as André Chabrolles
- Raymond Cordy as Le pêcheur
- Janine Guise as Laurence de Tourville
- Jean Tissier as Jacques de Tourville
- Jean Dax as Le directeur de l'hôtel
- Maryanne as La dame de compagnie
- Émile Genevois as Le groom

== Bibliography ==
- Bessy, Maurice & Chirat, Raymond. Histoire du cinéma français: 1929-1934. Pygmalion, 1986.
- Crisp, Colin. Genre, Myth and Convention in the French Cinema, 1929-1939. Indiana University Press, 2002.
- Goodman, Ezra. "Notes for a Geography of Morals; In the Movies, Naughty and Nice Depend a Lot on Latitude". The New York Times, 10 July 1938.
- Rège, Philippe. Encyclopedia of French Film Directors, Volume 1. Scarecrow Press, 2009.
