= Marguerite Beaugé =

French film editor (1892–1977)

- Born: 23 October 1892; Blois, France
- Died: 6 April 1977 (aged 84); Paris, France
- Occupation: Editor
- Years active: 1918–1963

Marguerite Beaugé (23 October 1892 – 6 April 1977) was a French film editor. Beaugé died in April 1977. Her daughter, Yvonne Martin, was also a renowned film editor.

== Selected filmography ==
- Napoléon (1927)
- The Passion of Joan of Arc (1928)
- Levy and Company (1930)
- The Mystery of the Yellow Room (1930)
- The Unknown Singer (1931)
- The Levy Department Stores (1932)
- Sailor's Song (1932)
- The Abbot Constantine (1933)
- Toboggan (1934)
- Second Bureau (1935)
- White Cargo (1937)
- Pépé le Moko (1937)
- Beethoven's Great Love (1937)
- Lights of Paris (1938)
- Return at Dawn (1938)
- My Priest Among the Rich (1938)
- Chéri-Bibi (1938)
- Sacred Woods (1939)
- Immediate Call (1939)
- Radio Surprises (1940)
- Pierre and Jean (1943)
- The Murderer Is Not Guilty (1946)
- The Tragic Dolmen (1948)
- The Dancer of Marrakesh (1949)
- The Ladies in the Green Hats (1949)
- Minne (1950)
- They Were Five (1952)
- The Blonde Gypsy (1953)
- It's All Adam's Fault (1958)

== Bibliography ==
- Capua, Michelangelo. Anatole Litvak: The Life and Films. McFarland, 2015.
