= Serge Piménoff =

French production designer (1895–1960)

- Born: 5 October 1895; Yalta, Crimea; Russian Empire
- Died: 1960 (aged 64–65); Boulogne-Billancourt, France
- Other name: Sergei Pimenov
- Occupation: Art director
- Years active: 1927–1959 (film)

Serge Piménoff (1895–1960) was a Russian-born French art director. He designed the sets for the 1958 film Les Misérables.

== Selected filmography ==
- Nights of Princes (1930)
- The Unknown Singer (1931)
- Sailor's Song (1932)
- Lilac (1932)
- King of the Hotel (1932)
- Rouletabille the Aviator (1932)
- The Orderly (1933)
- Variety (1935)
- The Slipper Episode (1935)
- Nitchevo (1936)
- The Volga Boatman (1936)
- The Alibi (1937)
- Street of Shadows (1937)
- Return at Dawn (1938)
- The Postmaster's Daughter (1938)
- Savage Brigade (1939)
- The Pavilion Burns (1941)
- Colonel Pontcarral (1942)
- The Benefactor (1942)
- Macao (1942)
- The London Man (1943)
- Panic (Panique) (1946)
- Farewell Mister Grock (1950)
- Without Leaving an Address (1951)
- The Moment of Truth (1952)
- Napoleon Road (1953)
- Service Entrance (1954)
- The Case of Doctor Laurent (1957)
- Les Misérables (1958)
- The Goose of Sedan (1959)

== Bibliography ==
- Hayward, Susan. French Costume Drama of the 1950s: Fashioning Politics in Film. Intellect Books, 2010.
