= Orange Blossom (film) =

1932 film

- Directed by: Henry Roussel
- Written by: André Birabeau (play); Georges Dolley (play); Henry Roussel
- Produced by: Bernard Natan; Emile Natan
- Starring: André Lefaur; André Alerme; José Noguéro
- Cinematography: Victor Arménise
- Production company: Pathé-Natan
- Distributed by: Pathé Consortium Cinéma
- Release date: 17 October 1932
- Running time: 87 minutes
- Country: France
- Language: French

Orange Blossom (French: La fleur d'oranger) is a 1932 French comedy film directed by Henry Roussel and starring André Lefaur, André Alerme and José Noguéro. A son doesn't tell his domineering father that he has recently got married.

The film's sets were designed by Guy de Gastyne.

== Cast ==
- André Lefaur as Le juge Le Hochet de Méricourt
- André Alerme as Birbat
- José Noguéro as Alfredo Ramos
- Marcel Lutrand as Darblay
- René Lefèvre as Raymond de Méricourt
- Simone Deguyse as Madeleine
- Hélène Robert as Renée
- Blanche Denège as Mme de Méricourt
- Marfa d'Hervilly as Mme de Saint-Fugasse
- Daisy Thomas as La femme de chambre
- Jacques Beauvais
- Pierre Berlioz
- Clairjane
- Irma Perrot

== Bibliography ==
- Crisp, Colin. Genre, Myth and Convention in the French Cinema, 1929-1939. Indiana University Press, 2002.
