= Betty Stockfeld =

Australian actress (1905–1966)

- Born: 15 January 1905; Sydney, New South Wales, Australia
- Died: 27 January 1966 (aged 61); Tadworth, Surrey, England
- Other name: Betty Stockfield
- Occupations: Film and television actress
- Years active: 1931–60

Betty Stockfeld (15 January 1905 – 27 January 1966), often misspelled "Stockfield", was an Australian film actress. She appeared mostly in British and French films.

Betty was the daughter of Sydney businessman Harry Hooper Stockfeld and Susan Elizabeth Stockfeld, née Evans, and a niece of commander F. Pryce Evans of Shackleton's Nimrod expedition. They were in London at the outbreak of war in 1914, so unable to return to Australia.

The following is the copied entry from the Hungarian National Picture Gallery, which refers to the picture of Stockfeld, by Philip de László, in their collection:-

"2932 Betty Stockfeld as Mary Magdalen 1930 Standing half-length to the right, face turned upwards, wearing a large white wrap over a flowing purple dress, her long red hair loose, her hands raised to her face in a gesture of grief, all against a grey-blue background. Oil on canvas, 93 × 72 cm (36 ½ × 28 ¼ in.) Inscribed lower left:-

Philip de László / 1930 Laib L16226(433) / C31(12) Magdalaine [sic] NPG Album, 1929-30, p. 30 Magyar Nemzeti Galéria (Hungarian National Gallery), Budapest".

The National Portrait Gallery, London's website, shows four of their six portraits of Stockfeld in their collection.

== Filmography ==
- Captivation (1931)
- 77 Park Lane (1931)
- Blanc comme neige (1931)
- City of Song (1931) with Jan Kiepura
- Life Goes On (1932)
- The Night at the Hotel (1932)
- Monsieur Albert (1932)
- The Impassive Footman (1932)
- King of the Hotel (1932)
- Money for Nothing (1932)
- The Maid of the Mountains (1932)
- La bataille (1933)
- King of the Ritz (1933)
- Lord of the Manor (1933)
- Anne One Hundred (1933)
- The Weaker Sex (1933)
- The Abbot Constantine (1933)
- La garnison amoureuse (1934)
- The Man Who Changed His Name (1934)
- Thunder in the East (1934)
- Brides to Be (1934)
- Three Sailors (1934)
- The Slipper Episode (1935)
- The Lad (1935)
- Happy Arenas (1935)
- Fanfare of Love (1935)
- Runaway Ladies (1935)
- Le vagabond bien-aimé (1936)
- Under Proof (1936)
- Une gueule en or (1936)
- Women's Club (1936)
- The Beloved Vagabond (1936)
- Dishonour Bright (1936)
- L'ange du foyer (1937)
- Who's Your Lady Friend? (1937)
- I See Ice (1938)
- Les femmes collantes (1938)
- The New Rich (1938)
- Behind the Facade (1939)
- Les gangsters du château d'If (1939)
- His Uncle from Normandy (1939)
- Nine Bachelors (1939)
- Frenzy (1939)
- Sur le plancher des vaches (1940)
- President Haudecoeur (1940)
- They Were Twelve Women (1940)
- Hard Steel (1942)
- Flying Fortress (1942)
- The Girl Who Couldn't Quite (1950)
- Edward and Caroline (1951)
- The Lovers of Lisbon (1955)
- Guilty? (1956)
- True as a Turtle (1957)
