= Lilac (film) =

1932 film

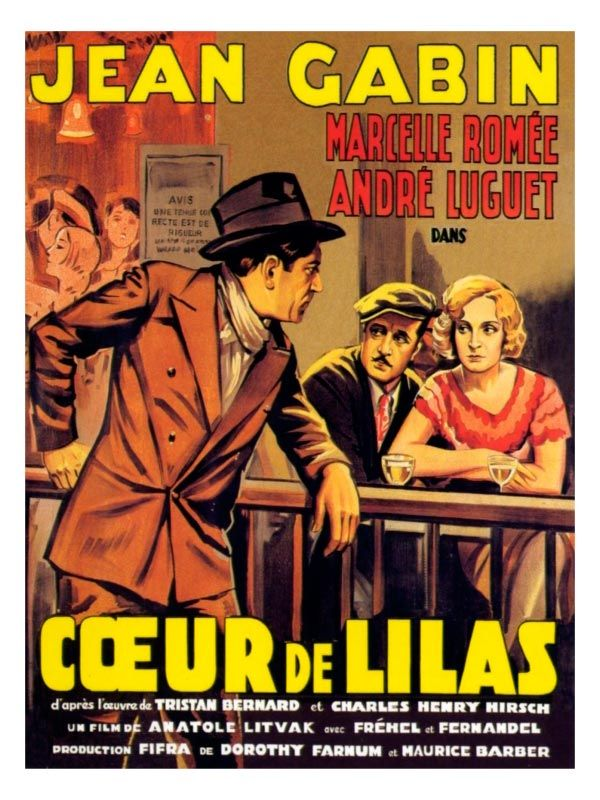
- Directed by: Anatole Litvak
- Written by: Dorothy Farnum; Anatole Litvak; Serge Veber
- Based on: Lilac by Tristan Bernard and Charles-Henry Hirsch
- Produced by: Grégoire Metchikian
- Starring: Marcelle Romée; André Luguet; Jean Gabin
- Cinematography: Curt Courant
- Edited by: Victor Fartowitch
- Music by: Maurice Yvain
- Production company: Fifra
- Distributed by: Les Artistes Associés
- Release date: 13 February 1932
- Running time: 90 minutes
- Country: France
- Language: French

Lilac (French: Coeur de lilas) is a 1932 French crime drama film directed by Anatole Litvak and starring Marcelle Romée, André Luguet and Jean Gabin. The film's sets were designed by the art director Serge Piménoff.

== Cast ==
- Marcelle Romée as Coeur de lilas
- André Luguet as André Lucot
- Jean Gabin as Martousse
- Madeleine Guitty as Mme. Charignoul
- Carlotta Conti as Mme. Novion
- Lydie Villars as La crevette
- Fordyce as Mme Darny
- Fréhel as La Douleur
- Marcel Delaître as Darny
- Paul Amiot as Merlu
- Georges Paulais as Le juge d'instruction
- Pierre Labry as Charignoul
- Fernandel as Le garçon d'honneur

== Bibliography ==
- Capua, Michelangelo. Anatole Litvak: The Life and Films. McFarland, 2015.
- Crisp, Colin. Genre, Myth and Convention in the French Cinema, 1929-1939. Indiana University Press, 2002.
- Goble, Alan. The Complete Index to Literary Sources in Film. Walter de Gruyter, 1999.
- Rège, Philippe. Encyclopedia of French Film Directors, Volume 1. Scarecrow Press, 2009.
