= Abduct Me =

1932 film

- French: Enlevez-moi
- Directed by: Léonce Perret
- Written by: Henri Hallais (operetta); Raoul Praxy (operetta)
- Starring: Jacqueline Francell; Roger Tréville; Arletty
- Cinematography: Jean Bachelet; Henri Barreyre
- Music by: Gaston Gabaroche; Pierre Varenne
- Production company: Pathé-Natan
- Distributed by: Pathé-Natan
- Release date: 28 October 1932
- Running time: 98 minutes
- Country: France
- Language: French

Abduct Me (French: Enlevez-moi) is a 1932 French comedy film directed by Léonce Perret and starring Jacqueline Francell, Roger Tréville and Arletty.

The film's art direction was by Guy de Gastyne.

== Cast ==
- Jacqueline Francell as Simone
- Roger Tréville as René Dargelle
- Arletty as Lulu
- Jean Devalde as Edgar
- Youcca Troubetzkov as Prince Aga
- Félix Oudart as the beautiful Léon
- Pierre Moreno as witness
- Gaston Jacquet as witness
- Mado Bailly
- Laura Bales
- Willy Castello
- Annette Doria
- Jacques Ehrem
- Andrée Lorraine
