= That Scoundrel Morin =

1932 film

- Directed by: Georges Lacombe
- Written by: Max Dianville; Charles Spaak
- Based on: Ce cochon de Morin by Guy de Maupassant
- Produced by: Joseph Muller
- Starring: Jacques Baumer; Rosine Deréan; José Noguéro
- Music by: Michel Michelet
- Production company: Compagnie Universelle Cinématographique
- Distributed by: Pathé Consortium Cinéma
- Release date: 30 December 1932
- Running time: 87 minutes
- Country: France
- Language: French

That Scoundrel Morin (French: Ce cochon de Morin) is a 1932 French comedy film directed by Jacques Baumer, Rosine Deréan and José Noguéro. It is based on the 1882 short story of the same title by Guy de Maupassant. The film's sets were designed by the art director Georges Wakhévitch. A further adaptation of the story was made in 1956 as The Terror with Women.

== Cast ==
- Jacques Baumer as Morin
- Rosine Deréan as Henriette
- José Noguéro as Valette
- Colette Darfeuil as Nelly
- Pauline Carton as Madame Morin
- Charles Dechamps as Le marchand de mannequins
- Roland Caillaux
- Edmond Castel
- Raymond Cordy
- Léon Courtois
- Alexander D'Arcy
- Monette Dinay
- Jeanne Fusier-Gir
- Anthony Gildès
- Gustave Huberdeau
- Charles Lamy
- Nathalie Lissenko
- Jane Marken
- Marthe Mellot
- Madame Montbel
- Marcelle Monthil
- Paul Ollivier
- Paul Polthy
- Louis Pré Fils
- Émile Saint-Ober

== Bibliography ==
- Goble, Alan. The Complete Index to Literary Sources in Film. Walter de Gruyter, 1999.
- Rège, Philippe. Encyclopedia of French Film Directors, Volume 1. Scarecrow Press, 2009.
