= Raymond Galle =

French actor (1913–2003)

- Born: 11 September 1913; Saint-Ouen, Seine-Saint-Denis, France
- Died: 23 April 2003 (aged 89); Paris, France
- Occupation: Actor
- Years active: 1931-1951 (film)

Raymond Galle (1913–2003) was a French stage and film actor.

== Selected filmography ==
- His Highness Love (1931)
- The Dream (1931)
- Coquecigrole (1931)
- Student's Hotel (1932)
- Hotel Free Exchange (1934)
- Bad Seed (1934)
- The Lie of Nina Petrovna (1937)
- Clodoche (1938)
- A Foolish Maiden (1938)
- Monsieur Breloque Has Disappeared (1938)
- Latin Quarter (1939)
- Angelica (1939)
- The Last Metro (1945)
- The Adventurers of the Air (1950)
- A Hole in the Wall (1950)
- Great Man (1951)

== Bibliography ==
- Klossner, Michael. The Europe of 1500-1815 on Film and Television: A Worldwide Filmography of Over 2550 Works, 1895 Through 2000. McFarland & Company, 2002.
