= Clochard (film) =

1932 film

- Directed by: Robert Péguy
- Written by: Robert Péguy; Maurice de Canonge
- Produced by: O.J Monat
- Starring: Georges Biscot; Simone Cerdan
- Cinematography: Willy Faktorovitch; Nicolas Hayer
- Music by: Albert Chantrier; Vincent Scotto
- Production company: Norma Film
- Distributed by: Pathé Consortium Film
- Release date: 1932
- Running time: 95 minutes
- Country: France
- Language: French

Clochard is a 1932 French comedy film directed by Robert Péguy and starring Georges Biscot and Simone Cerdan. In French the title is a phrase roughly equivalent to tramp. The film's sets were designed by the art director Robert-Jules Garnier.

== Cast ==
In alphabetical order

- Robert Ancelin as Poum
- Marcel Barencey as Le président
- Georges Biscot as Muche
- Germaine Brière as Madame Caquet
- Simone Cerdan as Madame Lubin
- Georges Flateau as Maître Chambourcy
- Louis Florencie as Bourrache
- Henri Lemarchand as Firmin
- René Poyen
- René Sarvil as Le chanteur des rues
- Louis Vonelly as Le substitut

== Bibliography ==
- Maurice Bessy & Raymond Chirat. Histoire du cinéma français: 1929-1934. Pygmalion, 1988.
