= Eugène Morel =

French librarian, writer, and literary critic

- Born: 21 June 1869 Paris, France
- Died: 23 March 1934 (aged 64) Paris, France
- Occupation: librarian, writer, literary critic

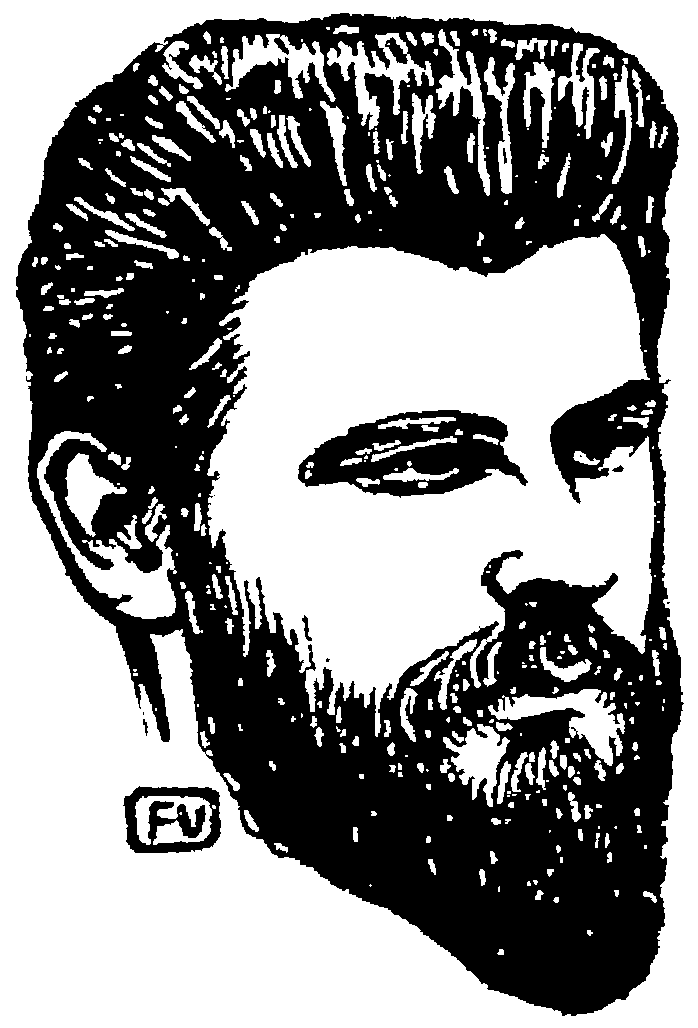
Eugène Morel par Valloton - T14p453.png

Eugène Morel (21 June 1869 – 23 March 1934) was a French librarian, writer and literary critic. One of the founders of the Association of French Librarians, Morel contributed greatly to the development of French libraries and librarianship in the 19th and early 20th centuries.

== Biography ==
Morel graduated as a lawyer from the faculté de droit of the University of Paris in 1869. After a brief literary career he became an assistant librarian at the Bibliothèque nationale in 1892. He was elected president of the Association of French Librarians in 1918, which he helped to found in 1906.

Morel’s main contributions to the profession of librarianship include a redefining of the librarian’s role and career. He also predicted the development of libraries in his book La Librairie Publique. As a pilot project, he introduced the Dewey Decimal Classification System in 1911 to the Levallois-Perret Library. He also supported the development of L'Heure Joyeuse, the first public library for children in France, founded in Paris in 1923.

== Bibliography ==
Librarianship

- Bibliothèques, essai sur le développement des bibliothèques publiques et de la librairie dans les deux mondes (1908–1909)
- La Librairie publique (1910)
- Bibliothèques, livres et librairies (1912)
- Le Dépôt légal, étude et projet de loi (1917)
- La Loi sur le dépôt légal (19 mai 1925) (1925)
- Catalogue de la bibliothèque de Levallois-Perret (1925)
- Cadre et index de classement décimal réduit à 3 chiffres (1925)

Fiction

- L'Ignorance acquise (1889)
- Artificielle (1895)
- Les Morfondus (1898)
- Les Boers (1899)
- Petits Français (1890)
- La Rouille du sabre (1897)
- Terre promise (1898)
- La Prisonnière (1900)
- La Parfaite maraîchère (1904)
