= Marcelle Romée =

French actress (1903–1932)

- Born: 7 February 1903; Neuilly-sur-Seine, France
- Died: 3 December 1932 (aged 29); Chatou, France
- Occupation: Actress
- Years active: 1931–1932 (film)

Marcelle Romée (7 February 1903 – 3 December 1932) was a French stage and film actress. She emerged as a film star and played the female lead role in four films, before committing suicide by drowning in the River Seine in Paris.

== Filmography ==
- La lettre (1931)
- Le cap perdu (1931)
- The Night at the Hotel (1932)
- Lilac (1932)

== Bibliography ==
- Capua, Michelangelo. Anatole Litvak: The Life and Films. McFarland, 2015.
- Conway, Kelley. Chanteuse in the City: The Realist Singer in French Film. University of California Press, 2004.
- Goble, Alan. The Complete Index to Literary Sources in Film. Walter de Gruyter, 1999.
