= Sailor's Song (film) =

1932 film directed by Carmine Gallone

- Directed by: Carmine Gallone
- Written by: Henri Decoin
- Produced by: Adolphe Osso
- Starring: Albert Préjean; Jim Gérald; Lolita Benavente
- Cinematography: Franz Planer
- Edited by: Marguerite Beaugé; Henri Rust
- Music by: Georges Van Parys; Serge Véber
- Production company: Les Films Osso
- Release date: 14 January 1932
- Country: France
- Language: French

Sailor's Song (French: Le chant du marin) is a 1932 French comedy film directed by Carmine Gallone and starring Albert Préjean, Jim Gérald and Lolita Benavente. The film's sets were designed by the art director Serge Piménoff.

== Cast ==
- Albert Préjean as Georget
- Jim Gérald as Marius
- Lolita Benavente as Carmen
- Sylvette Fillacier as Catherine
- Marthe Mussine as Marie
- Robert Cuperly as Le matelot
- Oreste Bilancia as Le cuisinier
- Doumbia as L'homme de couleur
- Ginette Gaubert as Maxe
- Franz Maldacea as Zizi
- Pedro Elviro as Jeff
- Louis Zellas as Gaspard
- Gasquet as Le capitaine
- Rene Rufly as L'officier
- Willy Castello
- Jesús Castro Blanco
- Fernandel

== Bibliography ==
- Crisp, Colin (2002). Genre, Myth and Convention in the French Cinema, 1929-1939. Bloomington, IN: Indiana University Press.
