= Henri Rust =

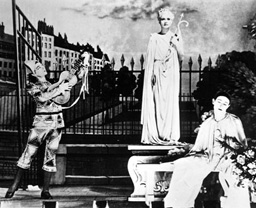
- Les enfants du Paradis
- Born: 10 August 1906; Laren, North Holland, Netherlands
- Died: 2 May 1996 (aged 89)
- Other name: Han Rust
- Occupation: Editor
- Years active: 1931–1977 (film)

Henri Rust (1906–1996) was a Dutch-born film editor who worked in several countries, notably France.

== Selected filmography ==
- The Threepenny Opera (1931)
- Sailor's Song (1932)
- Sleeping Car (1933)
- The Old Devil (1933)
- The Crew (1935)
- Mayerling (1936)
- Tovarich (1937)
- Les Visiteurs du Soir (1942)
- Children of Paradise (1945)
- Passion (1951)
- The Girl with the Whip (1952)
- Thérèse Raquin (1953)
- The Air of Paris (1954)
- Gervaise (1956)
- Wasteland (1960)
- Germinal (1963)
- Johnny Banco (1967)
- Les Assassins de l'ordre (1971)

== Bibliography ==
- Capua, Michelangelo. Anatole Litvak: The Life and Films. McFarland, 2015.
