= Fernand Francell =

French opera singer

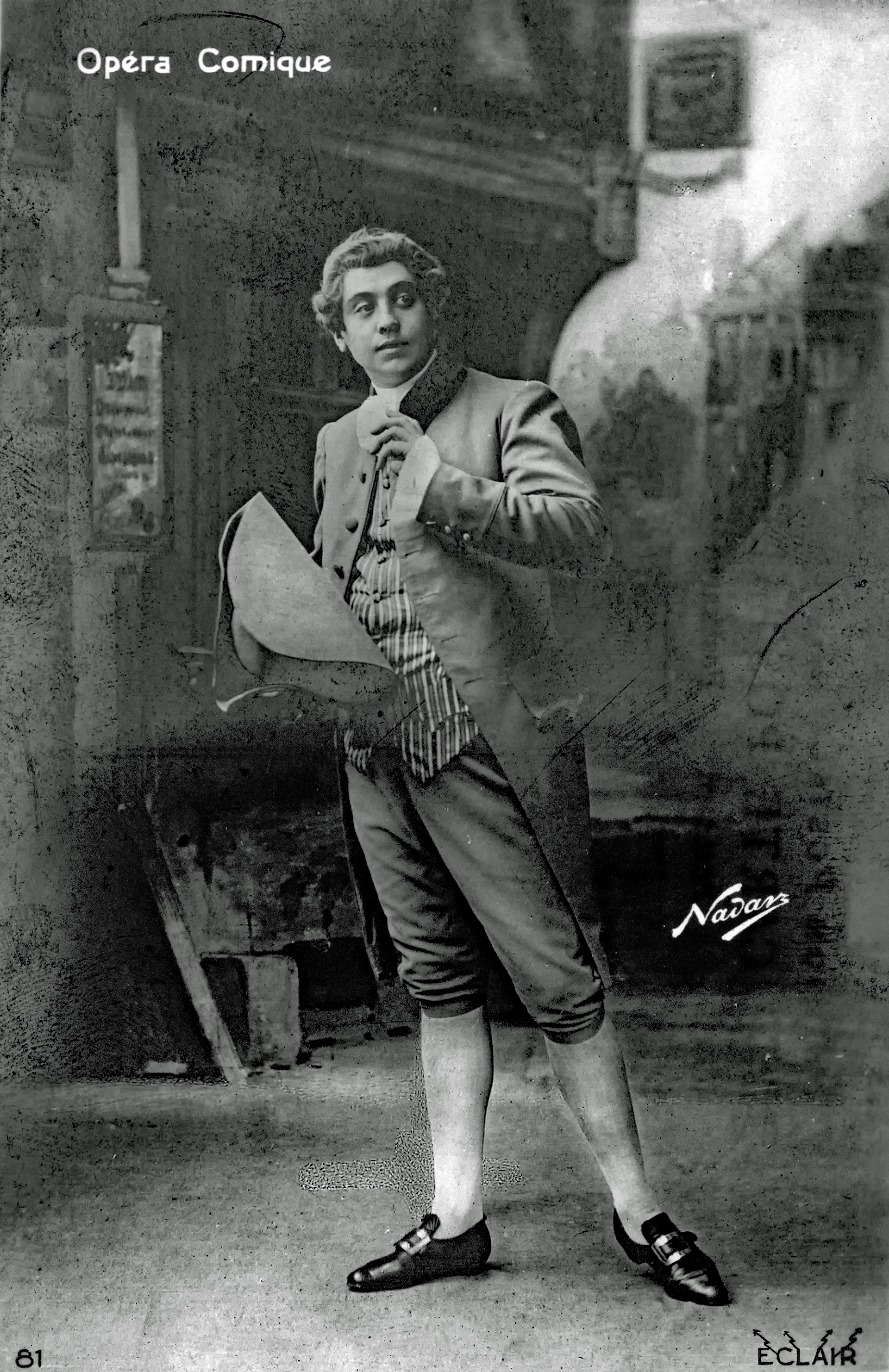
Fernand Francell, the creator of Fortunio, 1907

Fernand Francell (9 November 1879 – 18 February 1966, in Paris) was a French tenor and later actor and vocal teacher who was particularly associated with the Opéra-Comique.

== Career ==
Born Fernand Claude Eugène François in Gevrey-Chambertin, he studied singing at the Paris Conservatoire as a pupil of Isnardon in the opéra comique class and with Rose Caron in vocal studies.

He made his debut at the Opéra-Comique in Paris in September 1906 as Vincent in Mireille by Gounod, going on later that year to sing in the premiere of the one-act Le Bonhomme Jadis by Dalcroze (Octave) and the role of Prince Yamadori in the French premiere of Madama Butterfly by Puccini.

His other creations at the Opéra-Comique included Chiquito (the title role), La Danseuse de Pompéi (as Hyacinthe), Fortunio (title role), La Marchande d'allumettes (Gréham) Le Mariage de Télémaque (Télémaque), Solange (Frédéric), and in a double bill of the Paris premiere of La vida breve (singing Paco), coupled with Francesca da Rimini by Leoni (Paolo).

In 1908 Francell appeared at the Théâtre de la Gaîté in Paris, in a new production of La Basoche alongside André Baugé, Edmée Favart and Lucien Fugère, also singing Wilhelm Meister in Mignon.

He had a great success as Mârouf in Nice in 1921, and in 1922 he made a foray into comédie musicale with Monsieur l'Amour and Le Secret de Polichinelle.

Other roles at the Salle Favart included Ange Pitou in La Fille de Madame Angot, Almaviva in Le Barbier de Séville, Clément Marot in La Basoche, Rodolphe in La Bohème, Don José in Carmen, the title role in Les Contes d'Hoffmann, Georges in La Dame blanche, Alexis in Le Déserteur, Ottavio in Don Giovanni, Tamino in The Magic Flute, the title role in Fra Diavolo, Pedro in La Habanera, Jean in Le Jongleur de Notre-Dame, the title role in Joseph, Gérald in Lakmé, Des Grieux in Manon, Pelléas in Pelléas et Mélisande, Nicias in Phryné, and Jean in Sapho.

He left only a few recordings; for Odeon La Traviata 'De ma folle jeunesse' and Fortunio 'Si vous croyez que je vais dire', for Eden Disques Mignon 'Adieu, Mignon, courage' and, for Lyraphon, Fortunio 'J'aimais la vieille maison grise'. He was the dedicatee of "Parfois, je suis triste", the third song in Lili Boulanger's cycle 'Clairières dans le Ciel'.

In the 1930s Francell appeared in the films Les Trois Mousquetaires (as Louis XIII) in 1932 and L'Appel du silence in 1936.

His daughter was the singer and well-known stage and film actress Jacqueline Francell (1908–1962). They both appeared in L'Appel du silence.
