= Georges Dolley =

French writer

- Born: 13 December 1882; Paris, France
- Died: 17 May 1958 (aged 75); Paris, France
- Occupation: Screenwriter
- Years active: 1930-1947 (film)

Georges Dolley (1882–1958) was a French playwright, novelist and screenwriter. A number of his works have been adapted into films.

== Selected filmography ==
- The King of Paris (1930)
- My Friend Victor (1931)
- Orange Blossom (1932)
- Beauty Spot (1932)
- Fun in the Barracks (1932)
- Two Hearts Beat as One (1932)
- The Girl and the Boy (1932)
- High and Low (1933)
- Professeur Cupidon (1933)
- The Fakir of the Grand Hotel (1934)
- Your Smile (1934)
- L'aristo (1934)
- The Lady from Vittel (1937)
- Four Knaves (1947)

== Bibliography ==
- Goble, Alan. The Complete Index to Literary Sources in Film. Walter de Gruyter, 1999.
- Leahy, Sarah & Vanderschelden, Isabelle. Screenwriters in French cinema. Manchester University Press, 2021.
- Waldman, Harry. Maurice Tourneur: The Life and Films. McFarland, 2001.
