= Suzanne (1932 film) =

1932 film

- Directed by: Léo Joannon; Raymond Rouleau
- Written by: Steve Passeur
- Produced by: Georges Marret
- Starring: Pauline Carton; Louis Florencie; Yves Gladine
- Cinematography: Nikolai Toporkoff
- Edited by: Jean Feyte
- Music by: Lionel Cazaux
- Release date: 1932
- Country: France
- Language: French

Suzanne is a 1932 French drama film directed by Léo Joannon and Raymond Rouleau and starring Pauline Carton, Louis Florencie and Yves Gladine.

== Cast ==
- Pauline Carton as Mme Batonné
- Louis Florencie
- Yves Gladine
- Jean-Max
- Joachim
- Yolande Laffon
- Véra Markels
- Raymonde Mickel
- Raymond Rouleau

== Bibliography ==
- Dayna Oscherwitz & MaryEllen Higgins. The A to Z of French Cinema. Scarecrow Press, 2009.
