= At Your Orders, Madame =

1939 film

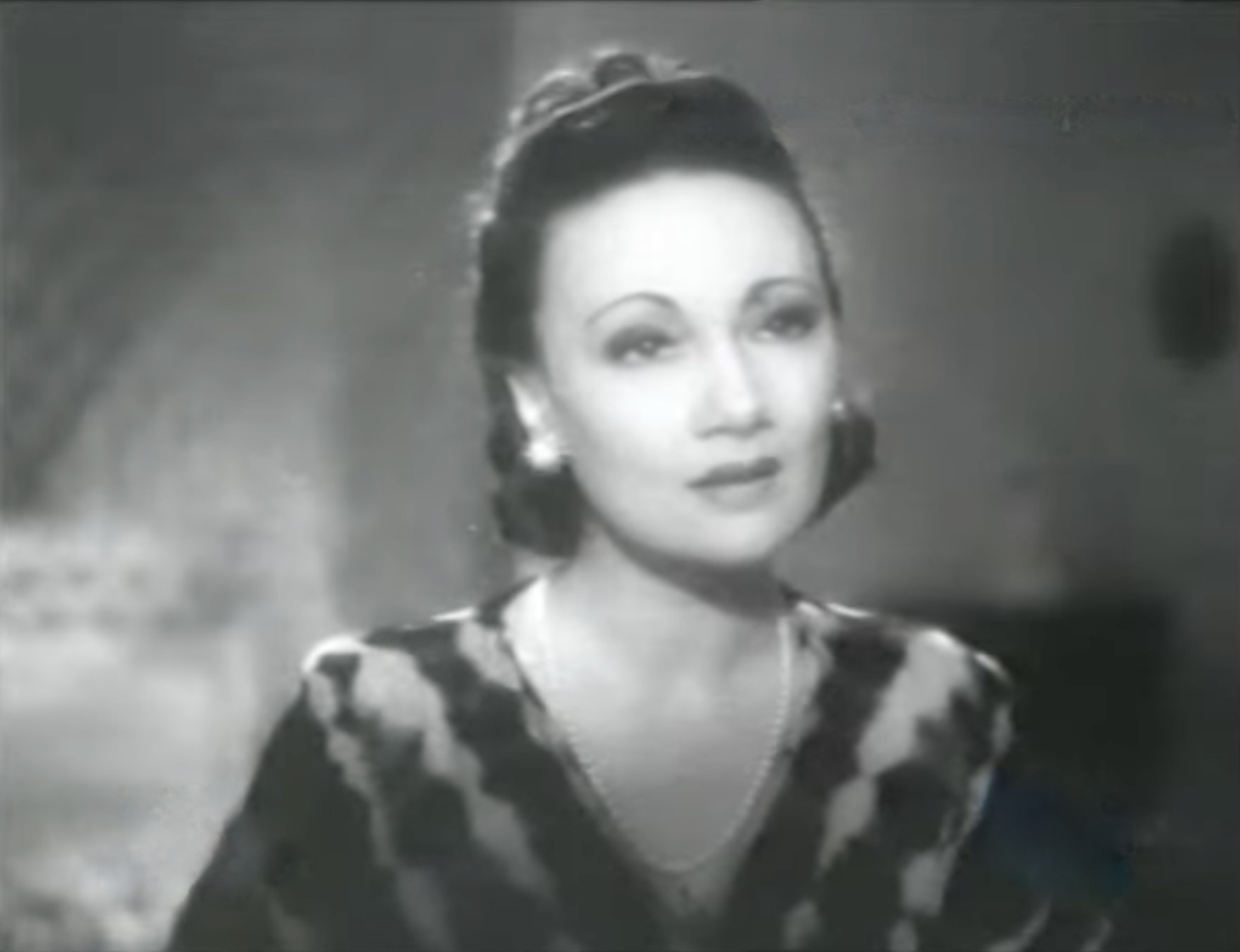
- Merlini in a film scene
- Directed by: Mario Mattoli
- Screenplay by: Oreste Biancoli; Mario Mattoli
- Based on: Un déjeuner de soleil, a 1926 play by André Birabeau
- Produced by: Angelo Besozzi
- Starring: Elsa Merlini; Vittorio De Sica
- Cinematography: Arturo Gallea
- Edited by: Fernando Tropea
- Release date: 15 February 1939
- Running time: 70 minutes
- Country: Italy
- Language: Italian

At Your Orders, Madame (Italian: Ai vostri ordini, signora) is a 1939 Italian "white-telephones" comedy film directed by Mario Mattoli and starring Antonio Gandusio.

== Cast ==
- Elsa Merlini as Manon
- Vittorio De Sica as Pietro Haguet
- Giuditta Rissone as Evelina Watron
- Enrico Viarisio as Paolo Vernisset
- Enzo Biliotti as Fleury Valée
- Pina Renzi as Madame Bagnol
- Armando Migliari as Il notaio
- Elena Altieri as Ginette
- Achille Majeroni as L'attore
- Luigi Pavese as Il maître d'hotel
- Lauro Gazzolo as Il cameriere all'albergo
- Ernesto Almirante as Lorot, l'impiegato del notaio

== See also ==
- Breakfast at Sunrise (1927)
