= Beauty Spot =

1932 film

- Directed by: Pierre Caron; Léonce Perret
- Written by: Georges Dolley (play); Léonce Perret
- Produced by: Bernard Natan; Emile Natan
- Starring: Simone Cerdan; Marfa d'Hervilly; Doris Morrey
- Cinematography: Fédote Bourgasoff
- Music by: André Roubaud; Otto Stransky
- Production company: Pathé-Natan
- Distributed by: Pathé Consortium Cinéma
- Release date: 8 March 1932
- Running time: 78 minutes
- Country: France
- Language: French

Beauty Spot (French: Grains de beauté) is a 1932 French musical comedy film directed by Pierre Caron and Léonce Perret and starring Simone Cerdan, Marfa d'Hervilly and Doris Morrey. It is a remake of the 1931 German film Opera Ball and is part of the operetta film genre.

The film's sets were designed by Jacques Colombier.

== Cast ==
- Simone Cerdan as Colette Dupont
- Marfa d'Hervilly as Tante Aurélie
- Doris Morrey as Pepita
- Christiane Tourneur as Lily
- Jeanne Fusier-Gir as Jacqueline
- Roger Tréville as Jacques
- Albert Duvaleix as Lucien Fortier
- Marcel Lutrand as André
- Marcel Lagrange as Durvy
- Henri Richard as L'ambassadeur
- André Roanne as Pierre Daumont
- Netta Duchâteau
- Louis Florencie
- Nono Lecorre
- George Rigaud

== See also ==
- After the Ball (1932)

== Bibliography ==
- Crisp, Colin. Genre, Myth and Convention in the French Cinema, 1929-1939. Indiana University Press, 2002.
