= Our Lord's Vineyard =

1932 film

- Directed by: René Hervil
- Written by: Francis de Croisset (play); Pierre Maudru; Robert de Flers (play)
- Produced by: Jacques Haïk
- Starring: Victor Boucher; Simone Cerdan
- Cinematography: Paul Cotteret
- Music by: Louis Masson
- Production company: Les Établissements Jacques Haïk
- Distributed by: Les Établissements Jacques Haïk
- Release date: 20 September 1932
- Running time: 102 minutes
- Country: France
- Language: French

Our Lord's Vineyard (French: Les Vignes du Seigneur) is a 1932 French comedy film directed by René Hervil and starring Victor Boucher and Simone Cerdan. It was based on a play of the same title by Francis de Croisset and Robert de Flers. The film was remade in 1958, starring Fernandel.

Victor Boucher reprised the role he had played on stage with great success. The film is one of Hervil best-known features.

== Cast ==
- Victor Boucher as Henri Levrier
- Simone Cerdan as Gisèle
- Victor Garland as Jack
- Jacqueline Made as Yvonne
- Maximilienne as Aunt Aline
- Mady Berry as Mrs Bourjeon
- Jean Dax as Hubert Martin
- Léon Malavier as Jean

== Legacy ==
The film was screened at the Cinémathèque française in 2013 and in 2017.

== Bibliography ==
- Crisp, Colin. Genre, Myth and Convention in the French Cinema, 1929-1939. Indiana University Press, 2002.
