= The Night at the Hotel =

1932 film

- Directed by: Leo Mittler
- Written by: Eliot Crawshay-Williams (novel)
- Starring: Marcelle Romée; Jean Périer; Betty Stockfeld
- Production company: Les Studios Paramount
- Distributed by: Les Films Paramount
- Release date: 15 May 1932
- Running time: 85 minutes
- Country: France
- Language: French

The Night at the Hotel (French: Une nuit à l'hôtel) is a 1932 French drama film directed by Leo Mittler and starring Marcelle Romée, Jean Périer and Betty Stockfeld. It was made at the Joinville Studios in Paris by the French subsidiary of Paramount Pictures.

== Cast ==
- Marcelle Romée as Marion Barnes
- Jean Périer as Le colonel Cartier
- Betty Stockfeld as Jennifer
- Maurice Lagrenée as Fred
- Lise Jaux as Mme. Cartier
- Yvonne Hébert as Louise
- Willy Rozier as Emmanuel
- Magdeleine Bérubet as Aimée, la violoniste
- Vera Baranovskaya as La Russe désabusée
- Marcel Carpentier
- Hubert Daix as Le docteur
- Marcel Dalio as Jérôme
- Henry Harment as Le docteur
- Marcel Loche
- Jeannie Luxeuil
- Marcel Vallée as Le portier
- Ludmilla Yacowleff as Colette

== Bibliography ==
- Dayna Oscherwitz & MaryEllen Higgins. The A to Z of French Cinema. Scarecrow Press, 2009.
