= Student's Hotel =

1932 film directed by Viktor Tourjansky

- Directed by: Viktor Tourjansky
- Written by: Henri Decoin
- Produced by: Noë Bloch
- Starring: Lisette Lanvin; Raymond Galle; Christian Casadesus
- Cinematography: Jean Charpentier; Louis Née; Georges Périnal
- Music by: René Sylviano
- Production companies: Capitole Films; Les Films Osso
- Distributed by: Pathé Consortium Film
- Release date: 19 September 1932
- Running time: 91 minutes
- Country: France
- Language: French

Student's Hotel (French: Hôtel des étudiants) is a 1932 French drama film directed by Viktor Tourjansky and starring Lisette Lanvin, Raymond Galle and Christian Casadesus. The film's sets were designed by the art director Edouard Nikitine. It was screened at the inaugural Venice Film Festival in 1932.

== Synopsis ==
Odette, a student at the Sorbonne University in Paris is courted by two fellow students. She goes out with the charming Jacques and falls pregnant by him. Her rejected suitor, Maxime, still offers to marry her. Jacques, when he discovers her true situation steps in to propose to herself.

== Cast ==
- Lisette Lanvin as Odette
- Raymond Galle as Maxime
- Christian Casadesus as Jacques
- Yvonne Yma as Madame Sabatier
- Germaine Roger as Une étudiante
- Sylvette Fillacier as Thérèse
- Robert Lepers as Imac
- Henri Vilbert as Étienne
- Dimitri Dragomir as Tristan
- Georges Adet
- Jeanne Boyer
- Fanny Lacroix
- Jacqueline Made
- Bob Maix
- Odette Olga

== Bibliography ==
- Crisp, Colin. French Cinema—A Critical Filmography: Volume 1, 1929–1939. Indiana University Press, 2015.
- Crisp, Colin. Genre, Myth and Convention in the French Cinema, 1929-1939. Indiana University Press, 2002.
