= The Chocolate Girl (1932 film) =

1932 film

- Directed by: Marc Allégret
- Written by: Paul Gavault (play); Marc Allégret
- Starring: Raimu; Jacqueline Francell; Pierre Bertin
- Cinematography: Roger Hubert; Georges Périnal; Nikolai Toporkoff
- Edited by: Jean Mamy
- Production company: Les Établissements Braunberger-Richebé
- Distributed by: Les Établissements Braunberger-Richebé
- Release date: 12 February 1932
- Running time: 80 minutes
- Country: France
- Language: French

The Chocolate Girl (French: La petite chocolatière) is a 1932 French comedy film directed by Marc Allégret and starring Raimu, Jacqueline Francell and Pierre Bertin. It is an adaptation of Paul Gavault's play The Chocolate Girl. The film's sets were designed by the art director Gabriel Scognamillo.

== Cast ==
- Raimu as Félicien Bédarride
- Jacqueline Francell as Benjamine Lapistolle
- Pierre Bertin as Paul Normand
- Jean Gobet as Hector
- André Dubosc as M. Lapistolle
- Michèle Verly as Rosette
- Simone Simon as Julie
- Anthony Gildès as Mingassol
