= Breakfast at Sunrise =

1927 film

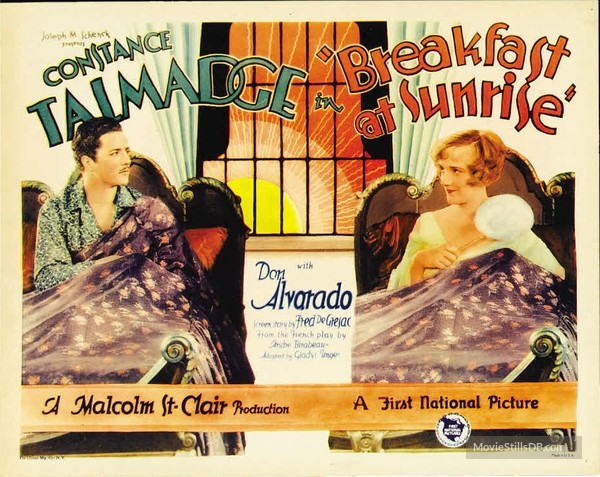
- Lobby card
- Directed by: Malcolm St. Clair
- Written by: Gladys Unger (adaptation); Fred de Gresac (scenario)
- Based on: Un Dejeuner de soleil, a 1925 play by André Birabeau
- Produced by: Constance Talmadge; Joseph M. Schenck
- Starring: Constance Talmadge; Marie Dressler
- Cinematography: Robert Kurrle
- Distributed by: First National Pictures
- Release date: October 23, 1927
- Running time: 62 minutes
- Country: United States
- Language: Silent film (English intertitles)

Breakfast at Sunrise is a 1927 American silent comedy film directed by Malcolm St. Clair and produced by and starring Constance Talmadge. It was distributed by First National Pictures.

Breakfast at Sunrise is one of the “sophisticated comedies” that St. Clair filmed of Paramount. The film presents a “doubled-plot line” in which two couples “rivaling each other, respectively toast with champagne, and the dueling/doubling effect is achieved with cross-cutting.”

== Plot ==
Two denizens of a grand hotel nightclub, the rich and attractive Madeleine, and the poor and handsome Marquis have a common desire: they wish to discipline their respective lovers by making them jealous: Madeleine, her betraying boyfriend Champignol, and Marquis, his faithless mistress Loulou, who performs at the nightclub.

Madeleine and Marquis enter into a conspiracy: they will publicly concoct a phony courtship, pretending to be in love. This charade is paralleled by dozens of nondescript people who have been hired by the hotel owner to parade about the nightclub in fancy dress. The purpose is to make the hotel appear prosperous to prospective customers. The entire hotel staff is operating under false pretenses: nobody is who he or she pretends to be. Madeleine and Marquis go so far as to stage a mock marriage to delude their lovers. In the end they abandon the deception, and genuinely fall in love with one another.

== Cast ==
- Constance Talmadge as Madeleine
- Bryant Washburn as Marquis
- Alice White as Loulou
- Paulette Duval as Georgiana
- Marie Dressler as Queen
- Albert Gran as Champignol
- Burr McIntosh as General
- David Mir as Prince
- Don Alvarado as Lussan
- Nellie Bly Baker as Madeleine's Maid

== Preservation ==
Prints survive at the George Eastman House and Library of Congress.

== See also ==
- At Your Orders, Madame (1939)
