= Louis Florencie =

French actor (1896-1951)

- Born: 4 December 1896; Paris, France
- Died: 4 December 1951 (aged 55); Madrid, Spain
- Occupation: Actor
- Years active: 1927–1951

Louis Florencie (4 December 1896 – 4 December 1951) was a French film actor. He appeared in more than 80 films between 1927 and 1951.

== Selected filmography ==
- Make a Living (1931)
- Companion Wanted (1932)
- Beauty Spot (1932)
- Suzanne (1932)
- Night Shift (1932)
- Clochard (1932)
- Ciboulette (1933)
- 600,000 Francs a Month (1933)
- Madame Bovary (1934)
- Bach the Detective (1936)
- Moutonnet (1936)
- The Lover of Madame Vidal (1936)
- Lady Killer (1937)
- The House Opposite (1937)
- Return at Dawn (1938)
- Paid Holidays (1938)
- Barnabé (1938)
- There's No Tomorrow (1939)
- Prince Bouboule (1939)
- Deputy Eusèbe (1939)
- The Porter from Maxim's (1939)
- Coral Reefs (1939)
- Love Marriage (1942)
- Prince Charming (1942)
- The Island of Love (1944)
- The Ménard Collection (1944)
- The Last Metro (1945)
- My First Love (1945)
- Patrie (1946)
- Four Knaves (1947)
- A Cop (1947)
- Coincidences (1947)
- City of Hope (1948)
- The Cupboard Was Bare (1948)
- White as Snow (1948)
- Night Express (1948)
- Return to Life (1949)
- The Sinners (1949)
- Two Loves (1949)
- Women Are Crazy (1950)
- The Darling of His Concierge (1951)
