= Georges Biscot =

French actor (1889–1944)

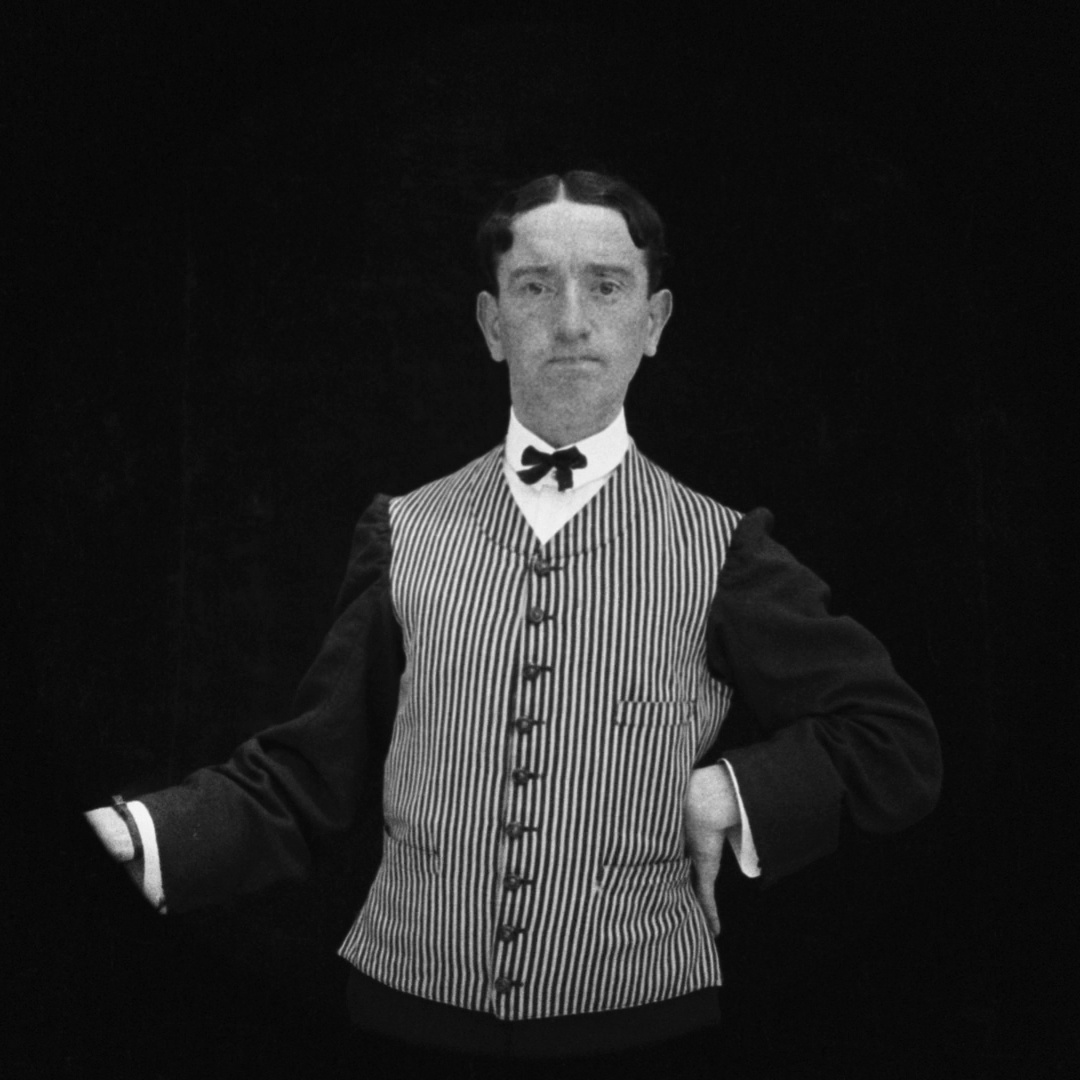
- Georges Biscot in Tih Minh (1918)
- Born: 15 September 1889; Paris, France
- Died: 18 December 1944 (aged 55); Paris
- Occupation: actor
- Years active: 1916–1945

Georges Biscot (15 September 1889 – 18 December 1944) was a French film actor. His birth name was Gaston Georges Bouzac. He starred in some 28 films between 1916 and his death in 1944.

He appeared in films such as Barrabas in 1920, and he died on 18 December 1944 in Paris.

== Filmography ==
- Barrabas (1920)
- Le p'tit Parigot (1926)
- Clochard (1932)
- 600,000 Francs a Month (1933)
- Untel père et fils (The Heart of a Nation, 1943)
