= Companion Wanted =

1932 film directed by Joe May

- Directed by: Joe May
- Written by: Bruno Granichstaedten; Ernst Marischka; Louis Verneuil; Hans Wilhelm
- Produced by: Bernard Natan
- Starring: Jean Murat; Annabella; José Noguéro
- Cinematography: Jean Bachelet; René Colas
- Music by: Bruno Granichstaedten; Willy Schmidt-Gentner
- Production company: Pathé-Natan
- Distributed by: Pathé-Natan
- Release date: 19 February 1932
- Running time: 85 minutes
- Country: France
- Language: French

Companion Wanted (French: Paris-Méditerranée) is a 1932 French comedy film directed by Joe May and starring Jean Murat, Annabella and José Noguéro. A separate German version Two in a Car was made, also directed by May.

== Cast ==
- Jean Murat as Lord Kingdale
- Annabella as Solange Pascaud
- José Noguéro as Antonio Mirasol
- Louis Florencie as Benoit
- Frédéric Duvallès as Anatole Biscotte
- Pierre Finaly as L'aubergiste
- Henri Richard
- Émile Riandreys
- Georges Tréville
- Charles Dechamps
- Louis Lorsy as Hotel Receptionist
- Christiane Tourneur
- Gaby Morlay
- Louis Verneuil

== Bibliography ==
- Jonathan Driskell. The French Screen Goddess: Film Stardom and the Modern Woman in 1930s France. I.B.Tauris, 2015.
