= Simone Cerdan =

French singer and actress (1897–1967)

- Born: 28 November 1897; Fontainebleau, Seine-et-Marne, France
- Died: 12 May 1967 (aged 69); Rémalard, Orne, France
- Occupation: Actress
- Years active: 1927–1948 (film)

Simone Cerdan (1897–1967) was a French singer and film actress.

== Selected filmography ==
- Marquitta (1927)
- Departure (1931)
- The Unknown Singer (1931)
- Beauty Spot (1932)
- Our Lord's Vineyard (1932)
- Clochard (1932)
- Paris Camargue (1935)
- Prince of My Heart (1938)
- Night Warning (1946)
- Three Investigations (1948)

== Bibliography ==
- Chris Fujiwara. Jacques Tourneur: The Cinema of Nightfall. McFarland, 2013.
