= Jean de Limur =

French film director, actor and screenwriter

- Born: Jean François Marie Chenu de Limur; 13 November 1887; Vouhé, Charente-Maritime, Paris
- Died: 5 June 1976 (aged 88); Paris, France
- Occupation: Film director

Jean de Limur (13 November 1887 – 5 June 1976) was a French film director, actor and screenwriter. His works include La Garçonne (1936) and The Letter (1929). He was born in Vouhé, Charente-Maritime. A French army officer and a designer, he first came to the United States with his parents, Count and Countess de Limur in September 1920; their destination was Burlingame, California, where lived Jean's brother André (who married Ethel, daughter of William Henry Crocker). He died in Paris in 1976.

== Selected filmography ==
- The Arab (1924) actor
- Human Desires (1924)
- The Legion of the Condemned (1928) co-screenplay
- The Letter (1929) director
- Jealousy (1929) director
- My Childish Father (1930)
- Monsieur the Duke (1931)
- Paprika (1933) director
- L'Auberge du Petit-Dragon (1935)
- The Slipper Episode (1935)
- La Garçonne (1936) director; with Arletty, Edith Piaf, and Marie Bell
- Runaway Ladies (1938)
- The City of Lights (1938)
- The Man Who Played with Fire (1942)
- The Golden Age (1942)
- Apparition (1943)
- The Great Pack (1945)
