= Marfa Dhervilly =

French actress (1876–1963)

- Born: 9 November 1876; Paris, France
- Died: 18 November 1963 (aged 87); Lagny-sur-Marne, Seine-et-Marne, France
- Other names: Marfa d'Hervilly; Marthe Dutreix
- Occupation: Actress
- Years active: 1922-1955 (film)

Marfa Dhervilly (1876–1963) was a French stage and film actress.

== Selected filmography ==
- Orange Blossom (1932)
- Beauty Spot (1932)
- A Day Will Come (1934)
- Sapho (1934)
- The Pearls of the Crown (1937)
- Paris (1937)
- The Red Dancer (1937)
- Fort Dolorès (1939)
- Monsieur Hector (1940)
- The Mondesir Heir (1940)
- Hopes (1941)
- The Lost Woman (1942)
- Private Life (1942)
- Last Chance Castle (1947)
- To the Eyes of Memory (1948)
- The Passenger (1949)

== Bibliography ==
- Goble, Alan. The Complete Index to Literary Sources in Film. Walter de Gruyter, 1999.
