= Jacqueline Francell =

French actress (1908–1962)

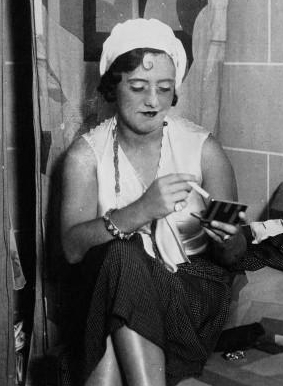
- Francell in 1930
- Born: 23 March 1908; Paris, France
- Died: 1962 (aged 53–54); Neuilly-sur-Seine, France
- Occupations: Singer, Actress
- Years active: 1928–1938

Jacqueline Francell (24 March 1908, in Paris – 12 October 1962, in Neuilly-sur-Seine) was a French singer, stage and film actress. As a singer she also appeared in opera at the Théâtre des Champs-Élysées, and created the role of Princess Blanche-Aline in Les Aventures du roi Pausole by Honegger in 1930.

In the field of comédie musicale she created roles in Déshabillez-vous ! (1928), Flossie (1929), Arsène Lupin, banquier (1930, alongside Jean Gabin), La Pouponnière (1932), Oh ! Papa !... (1933), Florestan 1er, prince de Monaco (1933), La Margoton du bataillon (1937) and J'hésite (1938), recording songs from most of these pieces.

She was the daughter of the tenor, and later vocal teacher, Fernand Francell.

== Selected filmography ==
- The Chocolate Girl (1932)
- Abduct Me (1932)
- Call of Silence (1936)
- The Great Refrain (1936)
- My Aunts and I (1937)

== Bibliography ==
- Goble, Alan. The Complete Index to Literary Sources in Film. Walter de Gruyter, 1999.
