= José Noguero =

French actor (1905–1993)

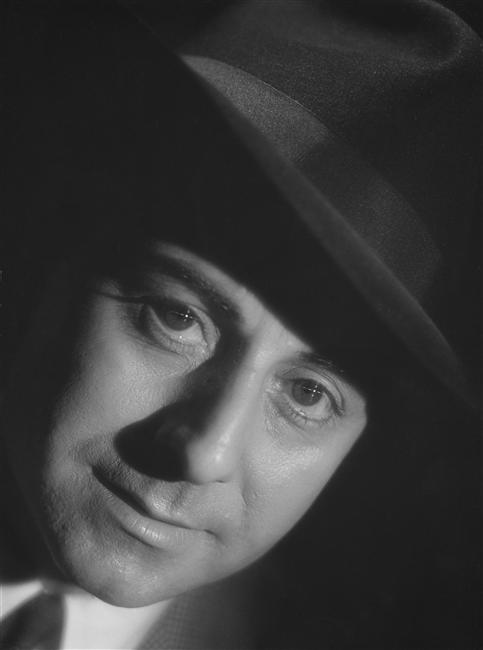
- Noguero in 1944
- Born: José Noguero-Sierra; March 10, 1905; Bordeaux, France
- Died: March 11, 1993; Bordeaux, France
- Occupation: Actor
- Years active: 1930–1979

José Noguero (March 10, 1905 – March 11, 1993) was a French film and stage actor and comedian. In 1948 he starred in the film The Lame Devil directed by Sacha Guitry. He was the son of Spanish immigrants. Between 1930 and 1980 he appeared in more than 40 films.

== Filmography ==
- Tenderness (1930) as Jarville, L'amant
- L'Arlésienne (1930) as Frédéri
- Dance Hall (1931) as Luisito
- Companion Wanted (1932) as Antonio Mirasol
- In the Name of the Law (1932) Gonzalès
- Orange Blossom (1932) as Alfredo Ramos
- That Scoundrel Morin (1932) as Valette
- King of Hotels (1932) as Unknown role
- The Merry Monarch (1933) as The Airman
- Le grand bluff (1933) as Roger Latour
- Die Abenteuer des Königs Pausole (1933) as Giglio
- The Weaker Sex (1933) as Carlos Pinto
- Les aventures du roi Pausole (1933) as Giglio
- The Last Night (1934) as Paul Gérard
- The Last Billionaire (1934) as Band Leader
- Turandot, Princess of China (1935) as Le prince de Samarcande
- Le baron tzigane (1935) as Ernö
- Sous la griffe (1935) as Harry Trelawnay
- La petite sauvage (1935) as Pedro
- Excursion Train (1936) as Verdurin
- Miarka (1937) as Luigi
- The West (1938) as Armand
- Troubled Heart (1938) as René Arnal
- Yamilé sous les cèdres (1939) as Khalil
- The Blue Danube (1940) as Sandor
- Retour de flamme (1943) as Colombière
- Mandrin (1947) as Mandrin
- Le comédien (1948) as Le journaliste argentin
- The Lame Devil (1948) as Le duc de San Carlos
- Forbidden to the Public (1949) as Pepito Papajo
- Le 84 prend des vacances (1950) as Micha Bey
- Nous avons tous fait la même chose de René Sti (1950) as Rémi de la Vieuxville
- Adhémar (1951) as Don Cristobal
- An Artist with Ladies (1952) as Gonzalès Cordeba y Navarro y Vavor
- This Age Without Pity (1952) as Eduardo Tocata
- L'inspecteur connaît la musique (1956) as L'inconnu
- Coplan, agent secret FX 18 (1964) as Le colonel espagnol
- Les enquiquineurs (1966) as Señor de Azucar
- The Looters (1967) as Le diplomate
- Le cavaleur (1979) as le Marquis d'Albufera (final film role)

== Theatre ==
- 1935: La guerre de Troie n'aura pas lieu by Jean Giraudoux, directed by Louis Jouvet, Théâtre de l'Athénée
- 1935: Supplément au voyage de Cook by Jean Giraudoux, directed by Louis Jouvet, Théâtre de l'Athénée
- 1955: Lady 213 by Jean Guitton, directed by Georges Vitaly, Théâtre de la Madeleine
- 1957: Feu ! by Yves Chatelain, directed by Paul Abram, Théâtre des Arts
- 1962: N'écoutez pas, mesdames ! by Sacha Guitry, directed by Jacques Mauclair, Théâtre de la Madeleine
