= Jean Dax =

French actor (1879–1962)

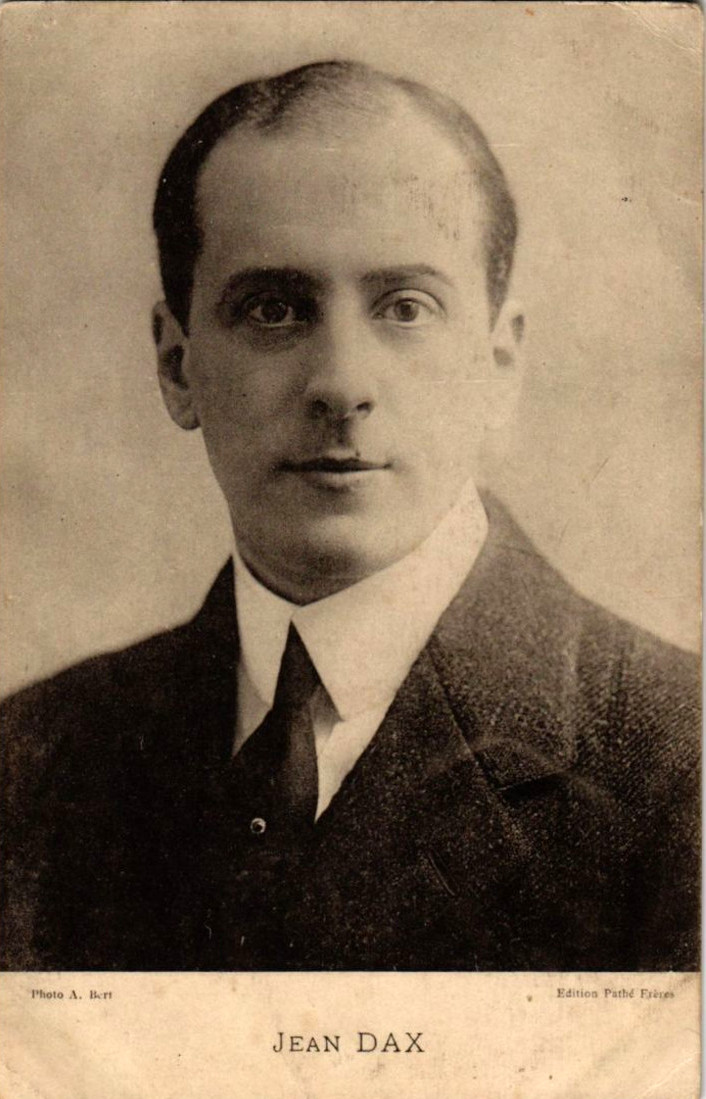
- Born: Gontran-Théodore-Louis-Henri Willar; 17 September 1879; Paris, France
- Died: 6 June 1962 (aged 82); Paris, France
- Occupation: Actor
- Years active: 1909-1939 (film)

Jean Dax (born Gontran-Théodore-Louis-Henri Willar; 17 September 1879 – 6 June 1962) was a French actor who appeared in more than 70 films during his career. He appeared in Maurice Tourneur's 1928 film The Crew

== Selected filmography ==
- The Hunchback of Notre Dame (1911)
- The King of Paris (1923)
- Education of a Prince (1927)
- The Crew (1928)
- The Secret Courier (1928)
- The Love of the Brothers Rott (1929)
- Der Kongreß tanzt (1930)
- Accused, Stand Up! (1930)
- Gloria (1931)
- Monsieur, Madame and Bibi (1932)
- Our Lord's Vineyard (1932)
- In the Name of the Law (1932)
- Charlemagne (1933)
- The Uncle from Peking (1934)
- The Queen of Biarritz (1934)
- Little Jacques (1934)
- The Slipper Episode (1935)
- Port Arthur (1936)
- Mayerling (1936)
- Charley's Aunt (1936)
- Counsel for Romance (1936)
- The Great Refrain (1936)
- Madelon's Daughter (1937)
- My Priest Among the Rich (1938)

== Bibliography ==
- Waldman, Harry. Maurice Tourneur: The Life and Films. McFarland, 2001.
