= Duhour =

Duhour is a French surname. Notable people with the surname include:

- Clément Duhour (1911–1983), French shot putter, actor, and director
- Édouard Duhour (1905–1969), French shot putter, brother of Clément

== See also ==
- Dufour (surname)
