= Henrique Zaga =

Euro-Indigenous Brazilian actor (born 1993)

- Born: Henrique Chagas Moniz de Aragão Gonzaga; 30 April 1993 (age 33); Brasília, Federal District, Brazil
- Occupation: Actor
- Years active: 2015–present
- Father: Admar Gonzaga

Henrique Chagas Moniz de Aragão Gonzaga (born 30 April 1993), also credited as Henry Zaga, is a Brazilian actor.

== Early life ==
Henrique Zaga was born in Brasília, Brazil's capital city. He is of Afro and Native Brazilian descent through his mother and Euro Brazilian descent through his father.

Zaga moved to Los Angeles to pursuit his acting career.

== Career ==
Zaga gained recognition early in his career, when he was cast as Josh Diaz in the MTV series Teen Wolf. Gonzaga later appeared in the Netflix film XOXO, and the series 13 Reasons Why.

In April 2017, he was cast as Marvel superhero Roberto da Costa / Sunspot in the 20th Century Fox X-Men spin-off film, The New Mutants.

On 12 November 2021, it was announced that Zaga would star in the Netflix romantic comedy film Beyond the Universe alongside Giulia Be. The film was released on 27 October 2022.

In April 2024, it was announced that Zaga had joined the cast of Warfare, a war film written and directed by Ray Mendoza and Alex Garland.

== Filmography ==
=== Film ===
Year	Title	Role	Notes
2016	XOXO	Jordan	
2017	MDMA	Donnie	
2017	Deadly Detention	Barrett Newman	
2017	Cherry Pop	Brendan	
2020	The New Mutants	Roberto da Costa / Sunspot	
2022	Beyond the Universe	Gabriel	Acting in Portuguese and dubbing himself in English
2024	The Ministry of Ungentlemanly Warfare	Captain Binea	Credited as Henrique Zaga
2024	Queer	Winston Moor	Credited as Henrique Zaga
2025	Warfare	Aaron	

=== Television ===
Year	Title	Role	Notes
2015	The Mysteries of Laura	Theo Barnett	Episode: "The Mystery of the Sunken Sailor"
2015–2016	Teen Wolf	Josh Diaz	9 episodes
2017	13 Reasons Why	Brad	4 episodes
2019	Looking for Alaska	Jake	Miniseries; 5 episodes
2019–2020	Trinkets	Luca Novak	13 episodes
2020–2021	The Stand	Nick Andros	Miniseries; 5 episodes
2023	Nancy Drew	Tristan Glass	6 episodes
2023	The Crowded Room	Philip	Guest

=== Music videos ===
Year	Title	Artist	Role
2018	"Curious"	Hayley Kiyoko	New Boyfriend
