= Paulo Marinho =

Brazilian businessman and politician

- Marinho in 2018

President of PSDB in Rio de Janeiro
- In office June 18, 2019 – June 9, 2021
- Preceded by: Jorge Miranda
- Succeeded by: Otavio Leite

Personal details
- Born: Paulo Roberto Franco Marinho; March 5, 1952 (age 74) Rio de Janeiro, Federal District, Brazil
- Party: PP (2001–2009); PSL(2018–2019); PSDB (2019–2022); Avante (2022–2023); Republicans (2023–present)
- Spouse(s): Odile Rubirosa (m. 1973; div. 1981) Maitê Proença (m. 1982; div. 1991) Adriana Bourguignon (m. 1992)
- Children: 4, including Giulia Be
- Occupation: Businessman and politician

Paulo Roberto Franco Marinho (born March 5, 1952) is a Brazilian businessman, executive and politician affiliated with the Republicans. He worked in the financial market, in the shipbuilding industry, as a communications executive and became a well-known and influential figure in the society of Rio de Janeiro.

Marinho joined public life in 2018 after being elected first deputy senator for Rio de Janeiro on Flávio Bolsonaro's ticket as a member of the Social Liberal Party (PSL). He played a leading role during the 2018 election as one of the main contributors to President Jair Bolsonaro's election campaign, after providing his residence in Jardim Botânico as "headquarters". The location was used to record the election programs and, after the victory at the polls, to hold the first formal transition meeting and ministerial composition of the current federal government. Marinho and Bolsonaro split at the beginning of 2019 after Gustavo Bebianno resigned from the General Secretariat of the Presidency. A personal friend of Marinho, Bebianno was responsible for introducing Bolsonaro to Marinho in November 2017.

== Biography ==
Marinho in his 1973 wedding photo

Paulo Marinho, son of Moacyr Marinho from Acre and Maria Carmen Franco Marinho from Minas Gerais, was born on March 5, 1952, in Rio de Janeiro. He lived with his parents and three siblings in a two-bedroom apartment on Miguel Lemos Street in Copacabana. Marinho finished high school at the Colégio Pedro II and studied law at Candido Mendes University until his third year.

=== Business life ===
Paulo Marinho started working at the age of 14 as a helper for Ronaldo Xavier de Lima, owner of Excelsior Seguros and husband of former Miss Brazil Martha Rocha. Lima offered him an internship at Sedwick Forbes Insurance in London, where he studied for six months. At the age of 19, he joined the financial market and worked for large foreign exchange and securities brokers, such as Marcelo Leite Barbosa, where he operated on the stock exchange, buying and selling shares. Afterwards, he was hired by Vetor Corretora, where he dealt in the open securities market. At the end of the 1970s, he founded Stock de Valores, his own company.

After selling his share in Stock, he set up a new business partnership with Henrique Mayrinck and founded Globus Representações, a company representing foreign industrial companies in Brazil. He also established the independent video production company Press Vídeo, which produced the journalistic TV program Dia D, on Rede Bandeirantes, with several journalists, such as Zózimo Barroso do Amaral, Belisa Ribeiro, Fernando Gabeira, Miriam Leitão, William Waack, Augusto Nunes, Ricardo Boechat and Marcos Sá Corrêa. The program ran for three years.

In 1990, he joined Roberto Medina as a partner in the company Artplan Empreendimentos. Marinho was one of the people responsible for raising the sum of US$2.5 million required to get Medina released from captivity. In 1991, alongside Medina, he was one of the leading figures in organizing and promoting the second edition of Rock in Rio at the Maracanã.

In 1992, he was introduced to businessman Nelson Tanure by his friend and lawyer, Sergio Bermudes, and began working in the shipbuilding sector at the Verolme shipyard in Angra dos Reis, one of the largest in the world. Under Tanure's leadership, Verolme merged with the Japanese shipyard Ishibras in 1994. Marinho was vice-president of Verolme Ishibrás for over a decade. During the same period, he was vice-president of the Brazilian Association of Infrastructure and Basic Industries (Associação Brasileira da Infraestrutura e Indústrias de Base - ADBIB) and president of the National Union of the Naval and Offshore Construction and Repair Industry (Sindicato Nacional da Indústria da Construção e Reparação Naval e Offshore - SINAVAL).

In 2000, he worked with Tanure again. He mediated the sale of Jornal do Brasil and Gazeta Mercantil to the Nascimento Brito family, and became vice president of the new publishing group. Due to his new role, he moved to Brasília in 2004, where he stayed until 2006. In 2003, Marinho received the Collar of Judicial Merit from Miguel Pachá, president of the Court of Justice of the State of Rio de Janeiro (Tribunal de Justiça do Estado do Rio de Janeiro - TJRJ), the highest honor of Rio de Janeiro's judiciary. It recognizes authorities and personalities who, in the exercise of their activities, have contributed, directly or indirectly, with outstanding services to the legal culture and the Judiciary of Rio de Janeiro. In 2004, besides being a member of the Social Communication Council (Conselho de Comunicação Social - CCS) of the National Congress, at the time chaired by Dom Orani Tempesta, Marinho was awarded the Medal of Judicial Merit, the highest honorary distinction of the Court of Justice of the Federal District and Territories (Tribunal de Justiça do Distrito Federal e dos Territórios - TJDFT).

=== Political life ===
In 1986, Paulo Marinho, alongside Roberto Medina, Ricardo Boechat and Belisa Ribeiro, was one of the main contributors to Moreira Franco's victorious campaign against Darcy Ribeiro for the Rio de Janeiro State Government. Despite invitations to join Franco's administration, Marinho refused and remained in the private sector.

In 2017, after the election of Mayor Marcelo Crivella in the city of Rio de Janeiro, Marinho joined a council composed of Roberto Medina, Boni, Ricardo Amaral and Paulo Protásio, which developed the Rio de Janeiro a Janeiro project, a strategic plan that formulated an annual calendar with guidelines aimed at structuring, planning and reheating the tourism agenda in Rio de Janeiro. Although Crivella had personally announced and publicly promoted the project, his administration had not fulfilled the promises made after six months. The council was dissolved and the members disassociated themselves from Crivella.

In the same year, Marinho organized two major events with the Rio de Janeiro business community in support of João Dória, the then mayor of São Paulo, with whom he had been personal friends for decades. The goal was to expand Doria's base in the state for a potential presidential bid in 2018. On March 12, 2018, after the Brazilian Social Democracy Party (PSDB) selected Geraldo Alckmin, then governor of São Paulo, as the presidential candidate, Doria announced that he would resign as mayor to run for governor of the state of São Paulo in the 2018 elections.

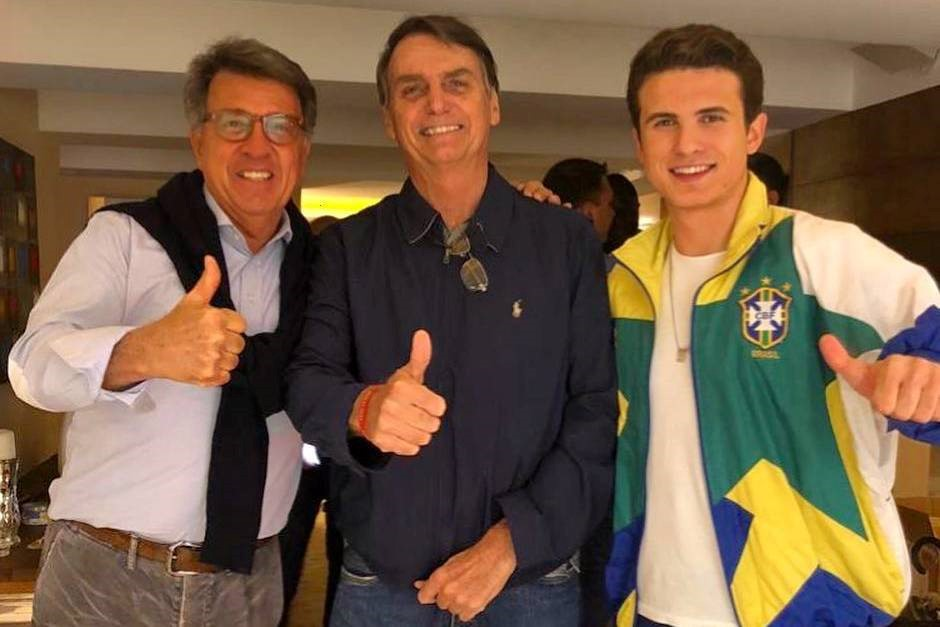
Paulo Marinho, Jair Bolsonaro and André Marinho together after the first round of the 2018 elections.

In November 2017, Gustavo Bebianno, a lawyer and then president of the PSL, with whom Marinho had been friends for more than 30 years, introduced him to the Bolsonaro family. Bebianno and Marinho met in the 1990s at the law firm of their mutual friend, Sergio Bermudes, and worked together in the 2000s at Jornal do Brasil, when Bebianno held the position of legal director. Marinho acquired trust and influence with the Bolsonaro family and played a decisive role in enabling Bolsonaro's candidacy during his presidential pre-campaign. Marinho's residence in Jardim Botânico became a meeting place for the campaign's main collaborators, including Paulo Guedes, Onyx Lorenzoni and Julian Lemos. Due to the campaign's financial limitations, Marinho provided his bodybuilding gym to host the marketing team responsible for recording and producing the material for the PSL's free electoral campaign on television and social media in the second round. On the eve of the PSL convention, Marinho was invited by Flávio Bolsonaro, the president's eldest son, to be his first deputy in the Federal Senate.

On September 6, 2018, Bolsonaro was stabbed while campaigning in Juiz de Fora. His wife Michelle was at Marinho's house monitoring the recordings in sign language when the attack occurred. Marinho and his son André were responsible for informing Michelle of the incident and taking her to meet Bolsonaro at the Santa Casa de Misericórdia in Juiz de Fora. On the way, he contacted the Sírio Libanês hospital, through his personal cardiologist, Roberto Kalil, to attend to him. However, Bolsonaro was treated at Albert Einstein.

On October 30, 2018, the first ministerial meeting was held at Marinho's residence. Since then, Marinho and Bolsonaro have never met in person. On February 18, Bebianno's resignation was announced; at the same time, Marinho officially broke with Bolsonaro. The following day, Veja magazine published audio recordings of Jair Bolsonaro and Bebianno talking during the crisis, which later revealed that Bolsonaro had lied.

In November 2019, Marinho testified to the CPI investigating fake news and virtual harassment on social media. On May 17, 2020, in an interview with Folha de S. Paulo, Marinho revealed that Flavio Bolsonaro said that he knew that Operation Furna da Onça, which targeted Fabrício Queiroz, would be launched. Marinho said that Flávio Bolsonaro confided in him that he had been warned about the operation between the first and second rounds of the elections by a Federal Police delegate who was sympathetic to Jair Bolsonaro's candidacy and that the police had contained the operation, then secret, to prevent it from taking place in the middle of the second round and damaging Bolsonaro's candidacy. However, Marinho failed to provide any proof of this information.

In June 2019, at the invitation of João Doria, governor of São Paulo, and Bruno Araújo, national president of the PSDB, Marinho quit the PSL and joined the PSDB to chair the party's Rio de Janeiro directory. Tasked with revitalizing the party in the state after the PSDB's worst electoral performance in decades, he summoned Bebianno to assume the pre-candidacy for mayor. After Bebianno's death on March 14, 2020, Marinho was chosen by Doria and Araújo to occupy the position of PSDB pre-candidate for the mayor of Rio de Janeiro in the 2020 election.

In the 2022 presidential election, he declared his vote for former president Luiz Inácio Lula da Silva (PT). Asked about his support, Marinho said: "Anyone who knows Bolsonaro like I do will vote for Lula. I have to pay a penance for 2018. [...] You need a side. My side now is to support Lula."

==== Pre-candidacy for mayor of Rio de Janeiro in 2020 ====
In June 2020, Marinho joined and was sworn in as the new state president of the PSDB in Rio de Janeiro. In an interview with the newspaper O Estado de SP, he defended Dória in the race for the presidency: "Dória is better prepared than the captain". Guided by Dória's mantra that the "new PSDB" should attract more "young people and women", Marinho contacted Mariana Ribas, the city's former culture secretary, which provoked criticism. For older members, she was unknown to the electorate and the decision ignored discussion; the new leadership defended the choice. In February 2020, Mariana claimed personal issues and dropped out of the running.

On March 5, 2020, Bebianno was announced as a pre-candidate for the mayoralty of Rio de Janeiro by the PSDB. The announcement was made by João Doria, then governor of São Paulo, at an event held at the PSDB's São Paulo headquarters. According to Dória, Bebianno's candidacy would be part of the party's national strategy for the 2022 presidential election. At the time, Wilson Witzel, the governor of Rio de Janeiro, praised Bebianno's pre-candidacy for the position of mayor of Rio de Janeiro and considered forming a single slate for the election between the PSDB and the Social Christian Party (PSC), to which Witzel is affiliated.

On March 14, 2020, Bebianno was with his son on a farm in Teresópolis. At around 4am, he fainted and was taken to the hospital, where resuscitation was attempted, but he died of a heart attack. On March 15, 2020, after deliberations made by Dória and Araújo, Marinho was chosen to take on the position of PSDB pre-candidate for the mayor of Rio de Janeiro in the 2020 election.

=== Personal life ===
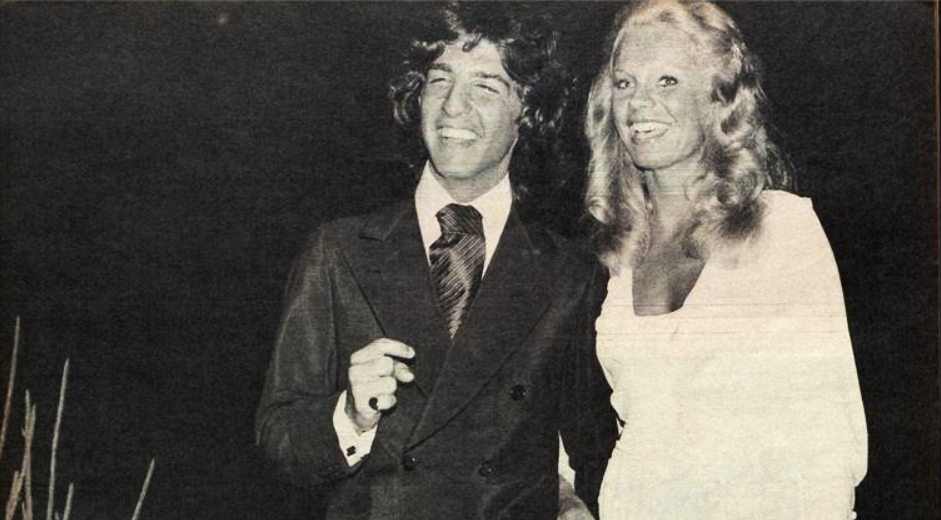
Photo of the wedding of Paulo Marinho and Odile Rubirosa, published in Manchete magazine.

In May 1973, at the age of 21, Paulo Marinho married the French actress and international socialite Odile Rubirosa, widow of the Dominican diplomat Porfirio Rubirosa. The wedding was featured on the cover of that month's Manchete magazine. The apartments they lived in together in Ipanema and Copacabana were the location of many high society parties in Rio in the 1970s, attended by figures such as Frank Sinatra, Mick Jagger, Valentino Garavani, Michel Legrand, Rod Stewart, Elton John, Bob Colacello, Marisa Berenson, Ursula Andress, Alain Delon, Peter Frampton, Candice Bergen and Elsa Martinelli. Both also frequented Parisian high society in the 1970s alongside notables such as Aristotle Onassis, Jacqueline Kennedy Onassis, Henry Kissinger and Philippe Junot. In 1981, Marinho and Rubirosa divorced.

In 1982, he married actress Maitê Proença, with whom he had a daughter, Maria. In 1992, he married Adriana Bourguignon Marinho, from Rio de Janeiro, in a ceremony held at the home of his friend Sergio Bermudes and celebrated by his friend and then-judge Luiz Fux. Marinho had three more children, Danyel, André and singer Giulia Be.

== See also ==
- Jair Bolsonaro 2018 presidential campaign
- Presidency of Jair Bolsonaro
