= Odile Rodin =

French actress (1937–2018)

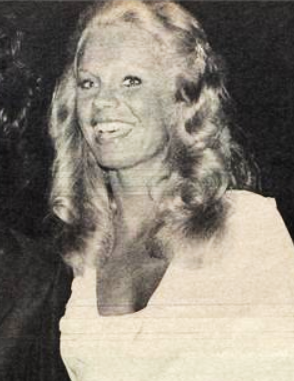
Rodin at her second marriage in 1973

Odile Rodin (born Odile Marie-Josèphe Léonie Bérard; February 21, 1937 – December 12, 2018), was a French actress and covergirl before she became the fifth and last wife of Porfirio Rubirosa. She adopted the artistic name of Odile Rodin due to the beauty of her body, alluding to the French sculptor Auguste Rodin.

Born in Lyon, Rodin came from a family where her father and grandfather were physicians. She came to Paris to study at the Conservatoire National d'Art Dramatique. Her career as an actress was promising but brief; she acted in two movies: Futures vedettes by Marc Allégret in 1955 and Si Paris nous était conté fr by Sacha Guitry in 1956. In 1956 she took the theater role of Marinette in Marcel Pagnol's play Fabien fr in Paris.

After her cover on Paris Match in 1955, she met Rubirosa, and their marriage on October 27, 1956 put an end to her acting career. Rodin accompanied Rubirosa during his social and diplomatic activities, was in Havana during the Cuban revolution, and mixed with the Kennedys. Kroth lists her as one of many mistresses of John F. Kennedy. After the death of her husband in 1965 she disappeared from the social chronicles and went to live in Rio de Janeiro, Brazil, where she married the businessman Paulo Marinho 1973, whom she divorced a few years later. She had an affair with the 16-year-old Alexander Onassis. Eventually she remarried and moved to New England, fading from public view.

She later married James Moss, an American, and died in New Hampshire at age 81.

== See also ==
Year	Title	Role	Notes
1955	Futures vedettes	Erica	
1956	Si Paris nous était conté	La Princesse d'Essling	(final film role)
