= Porfirio Rubirosa =

Dominican diplomat and playboy (1909–1965)

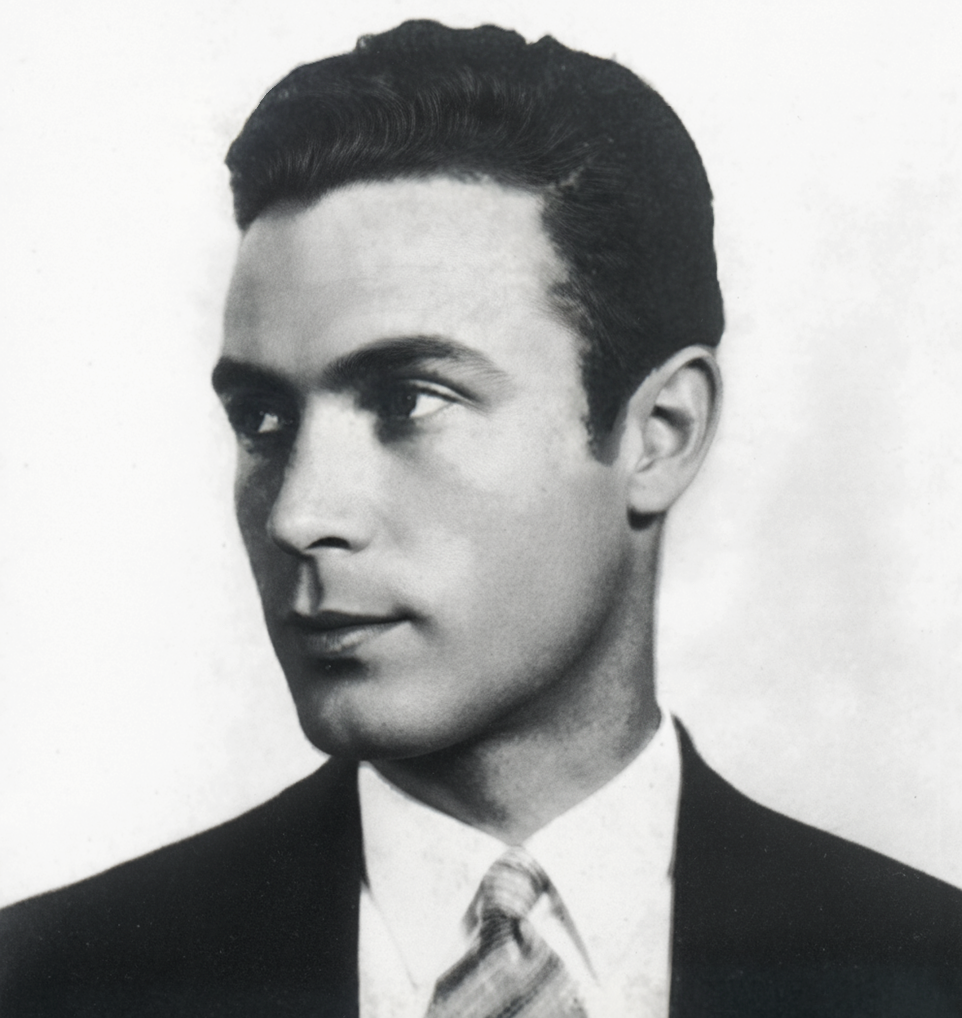
- Rubirosa in 1930
- Born: Porfirio Rubirosa Ariza; January 22, 1909; San Francisco de Macorís, Dominican Republic
- Died: July 5, 1965 (aged 56); Paris, France
- Occupations: Diplomat, polo player, racecar driver
- Spouses: Flor de Oro Trujillo (m. 1932; div. 1937) Danielle Darrieux (m. 1942; div. 1947) Doris Duke (m. 1947; div. 1951) Barbara Hutton (m. 1953; div. 1954) Odile Rodin (m. 1956)

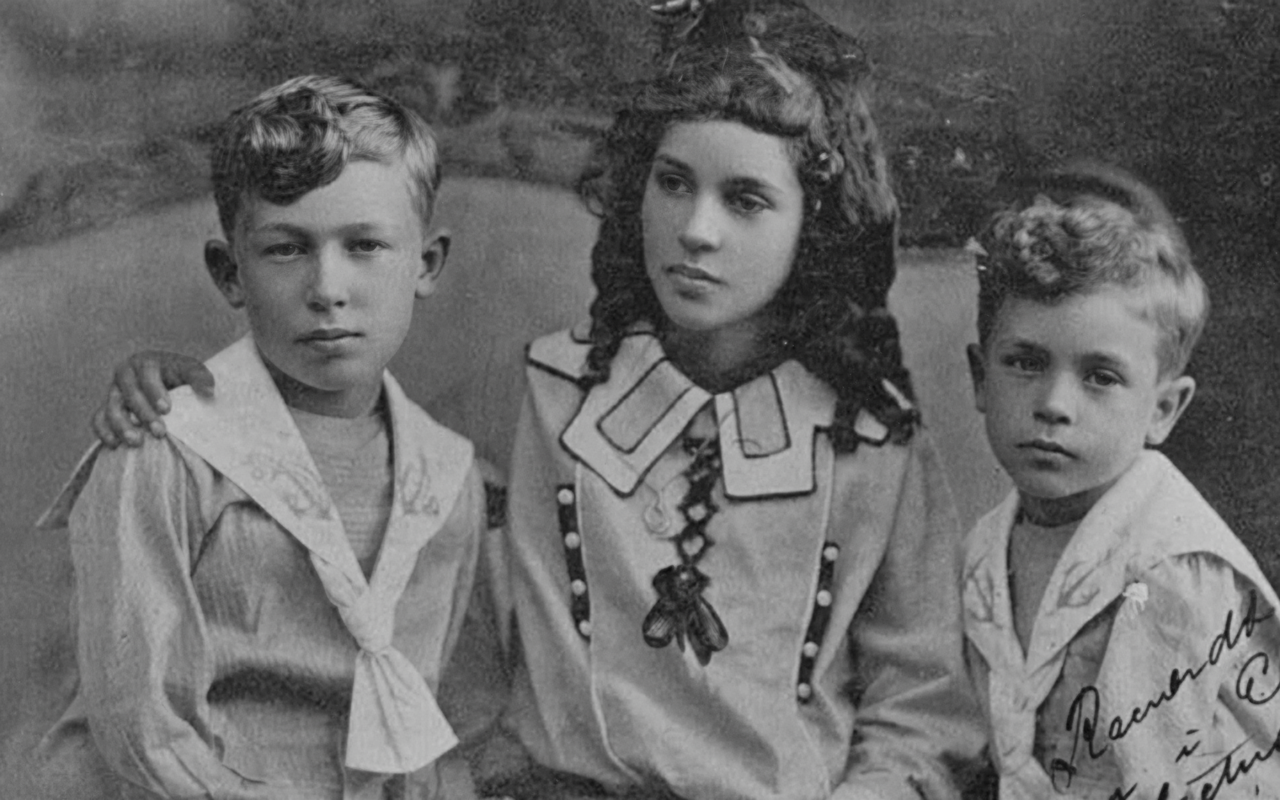
Porfirio Rubirosa appears on the left at just 6 years old, alongside his two siblings, Ana and Cesar.

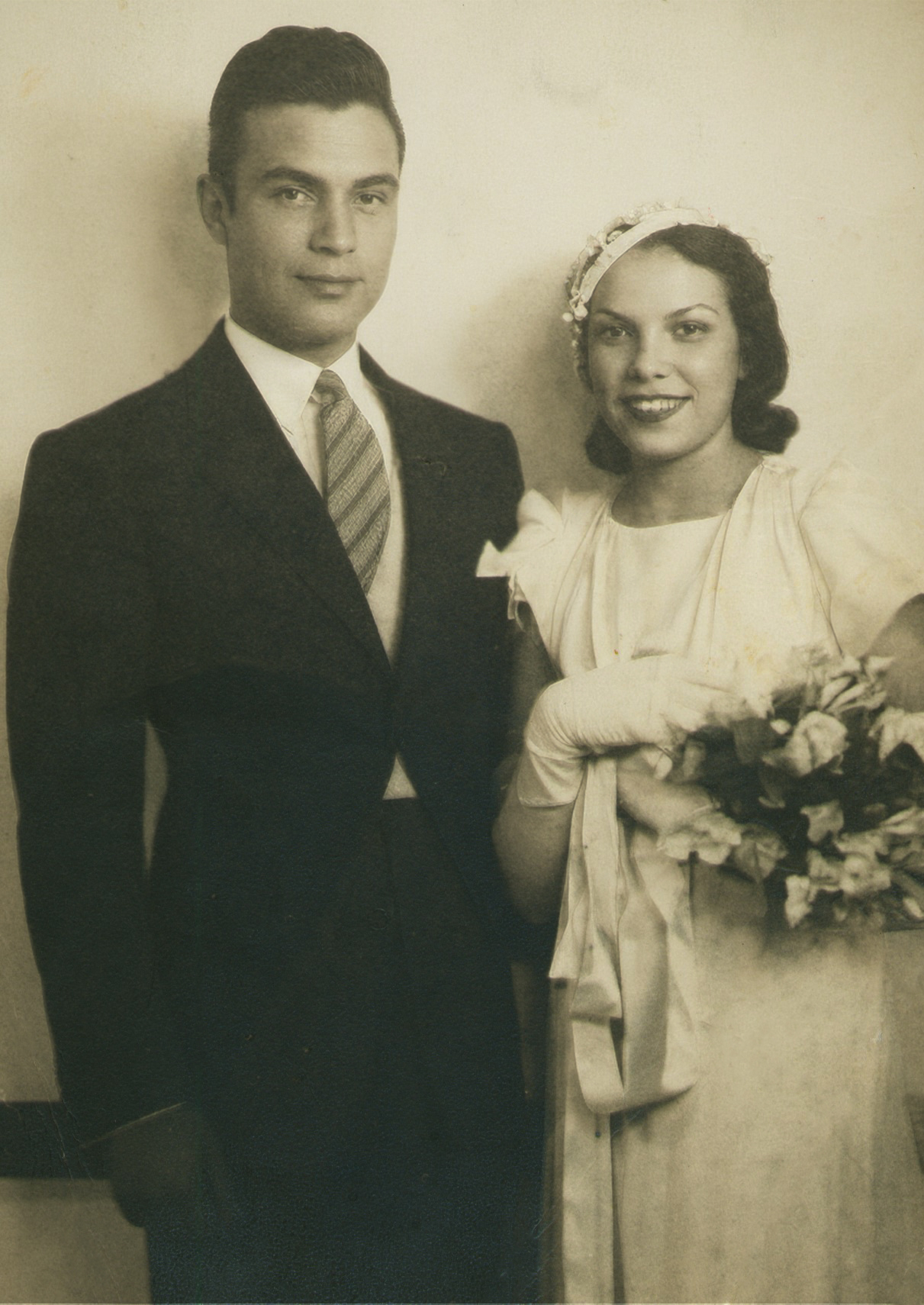
Flor de Oro and Porfirio Rubirosa, circa 1934

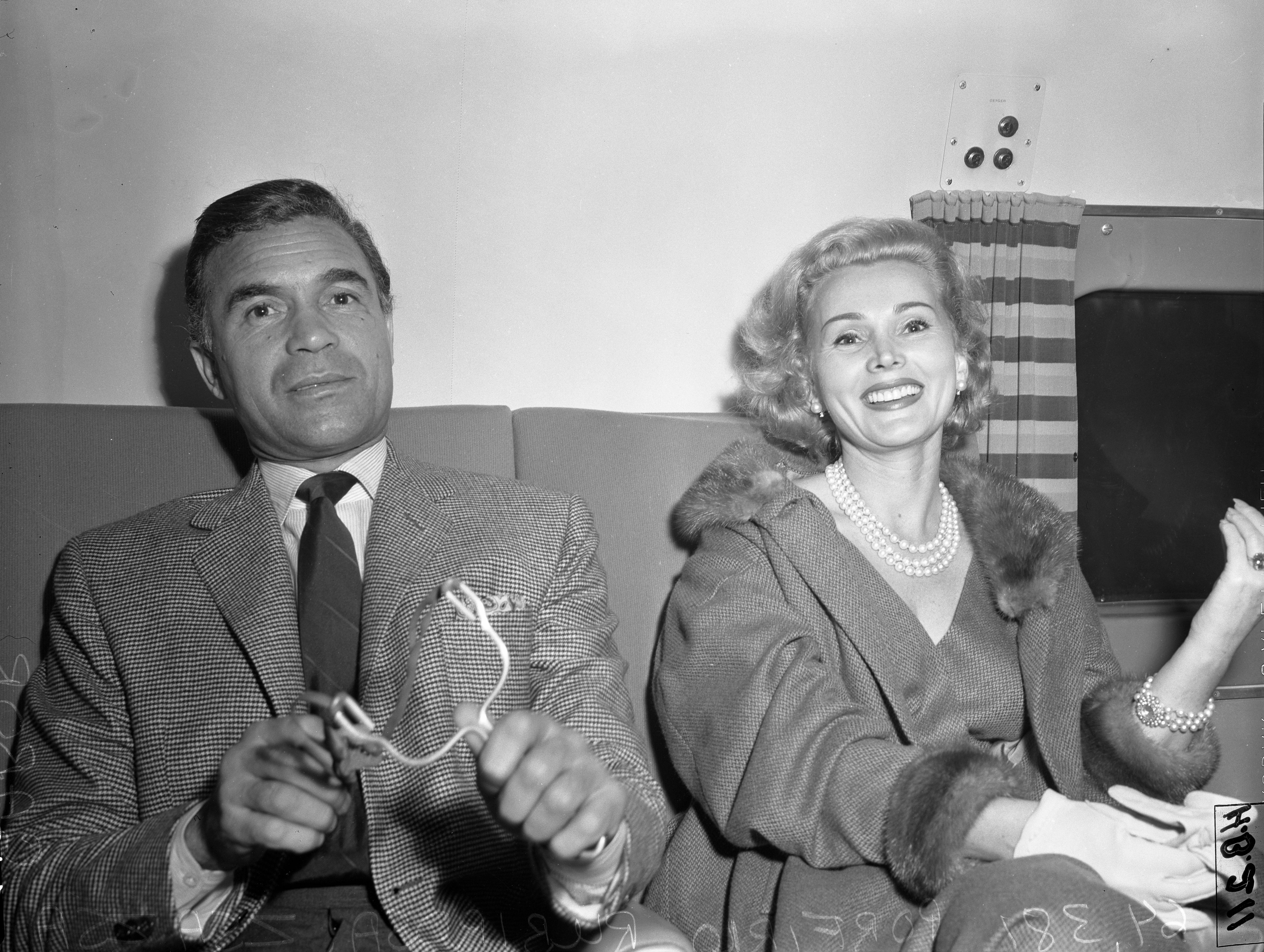
Zsa Zsa Gabor and Porfirio Rubirosa

Porfirio Rubirosa Ariza (January 22, 1909 – July 5, 1965) was a Dominican diplomat, race car driver, soldier and polo player. He was a supporter of dictator Rafael Trujillo, and was rumored to be a political assassin under his regime. Rubirosa made his mark as an international playboy for his jetsetting lifestyle and his legendary sexual prowess with women. His five spouses included two of the richest women in the world.

== Early life ==
Porfirio Rubirosa Ariza was born in 1909 in San Francisco de Macorís in the northern Cibao region of Dominican Republic. He was the third and youngest child of an upper-middle-class family. His parents were Pedro María Rubirosa and Ana Ariza Almánzar. The eldest child was named Ana and the elder son was named César. His maternal grandparents were Buenaventura Ariza y Castillo, who was from the Dominican colonial elite, and María Dolores Almánzar. His paternal grandparents were Pedro Rovirosa, a Catalan immigrant, and María de la Paz Rossi, the daughter of an Italian immigrant.

His father, also a womanizer, was at one time a "general" of a militia of heavily armed men working with the government in the mountainous Cibao region. Don Pedro advanced to become a diplomat, and after a stint at St. Thomas was made Chief of the Dominican Embassy to Paris in 1915. Rubirosa thus grew up in Paris, France, and returned to the Dominican Republic at the age of 17 to study law. But he soon changed course and enlisted in the military.

== Diplomat ==
In 1931, Rubirosa met Rafael Trujillo at a country club. The next morning, Trujillo made him a lieutenant of the Presidential Guard. This began a lifelong relationship between the two men. While there were rocky periods in the relationship between Rubirosa and Trujillo, Trujillo's patronage defined Rubirosa's professional career. Eventually, Rubirosa followed his father into diplomatic service, becoming a diplomat of the Dominican Republic in 1936.

In this role, he was sent to various embassies, first at Berlin (during the 1936 Olympic Games) and eventually to Paris, where he spent most of his time. Rubirosa would also serve at the embassies at Vichy, Buenos Aires, Rome, Havana (witnessing the Cuban Revolution), and Brussels. As an ally of the Trujillo regime, Rubirosa became an international socialite.

His 1938 divorce from Trujillo's daughter had little affect on his relationship with the regime. However, Rubirosa's social life occasionally ignited scandals, motivating Trujillo to dismiss him – as from his post in Paris in 1953 – or transfer him to another diplomatic role. Despite Rubirosa's flamboyant lifestyle, Trujillo recognized him as an asset for the regime, remarking: "He is good at his job, because women like him and he is a wonderful liar."

After Trujillo's assassination on May 30, 1961, Rubirosa supported his son, Rafael "Ramfis" Trujillo, as successor and attempted to persuade John F. Kennedy to help his government. Ramfis, however, lived a hedonistic lifestyle similar to Rubirosa himself. After his father's assassination, Ramfis struggled to stabilize the country's political landscape and was overthrown. When Ramfis and his family fled the Dominican Republic, Rubirosa's career came to an end. On January 2, 1962, the Council of State removed him from his unique appointment as "Inspector of Embassies". After losing his diplomatic immunity, he was interrogated by the New York District Attorney concerning the disappearance of Trujillo opponents Sergio Bencosme in 1935 and Jesus Galíndez in 1956, but was never charged.

== Personal life ==
Rubirosa was linked romantically to Dolores del Río, Eartha Kitt, Marilyn Monroe, Ava Gardner, Zsa Zsa Gabor, Maria Montez, Rita Hayworth, Dorothy Dandridge, Lupe Vélez, Soraya Esfandiary, Peggy Hopkins Joyce, Joan Crawford, Veronica Lake, Kim Novak, Judy Garland, Eva Perón and Amália Rodrigues. He dallied with his ex-wife Flor de Oro Trujillo Ledesma during his marriage to Doris Duke. He and Zsa Zsa Gabor were seen together during her marriage to George Sanders. When she would not marry him, although George was divorcing her, Rubirosa married Barbara Hutton. He was named a co-respondent in George Sanders's divorce suit from Gabor.

Rubirosa was married five times, but he never had any children. His wives were:

- Flor de Oro Trujillo, Rafael Trujillo's eldest daughter, December 2, 1932 – 1937
- Danielle Darrieux, French actress, September 18, 1942 – May 21, 1947
- Doris Duke, American heiress, September 1, 1947 – October 30, 1948; with marital gifts and final settlement he received an alimony ($25,000 per year until remarriage), a fishing fleet off Africa, several sports cars, a converted B-25 bomber (La Ganza), and a 17th-century house in Rue de Bellechasse, Paris.
- Barbara Hutton, American heiress, December 30, 1953 – February 20, 1954; in the settlement he received a coffee plantation in the Dominican Republic, another B-25, polo ponies, jewelry, and a reported $2.5 million.
- Odile Rodin, French actress, October 27, 1956 – July 5, 1965 (his death).

His playboy lifestyle was matched by stories of his sexual prowess. His reputedly larger than average penis size inspired Parisian waiters at Maxim's to name gigantic pepper mills "Rubirosas". The name stuck and has been in use all over the world.

== Polo and car racing ==
After World War II, Rubirosa became engaged in two major passions, polo and car racing, both expensive sports that would be supported in years to come by his wives. He organized and led his own polo team Cibao-La Pampa that was an often successful contender for the Coupe de France. Rubirosa played polo until the end of his life. In the same period, he started to acquire fast cars and form friendships with racing car drivers. He would own a number of Ferraris. His first race at 24 Hours of Le Mans took place in June 1950 with his partner Pierre Leygonie, and his second race, this time with Innocente Baggio, was four years later; in both races his car did not finish. Rubirosa participated in a number of races at Sebring, all but once as a private entry.

Rubirosa entered one Formula One race, in 1955, the Grand Prix de Bordeaux on April 25. He planned to drive his own Ferrari 500, identical to the one which brought Alberto Ascari the 1952 and 1953 Drivers' World Championship. However, he fell ill before the race and did not drive.

== Death ==
Rubirosa died in the early morning of July 5, 1965, at the age of 56, when he crashed his silver Ferrari 250 GT Cabriolet into a horse chestnut tree in the Bois de Boulogne after an all-night celebration at the Paris nightclub "Jimmy's" in honor of winning the polo Coupe de France. He is buried in Cimetière de Marnes la Coquette, in Paris.
