= Gilbert Bokanowski =

French actor and film producer (1920–1975)

- Born: 17 September 1920; Toulouse, France
- Died: 28 October 1975 (aged 55); Toulouse, France
- Occupations: Actor, Producer
- Years active: 1954–1960 (film)

Gilbert Bokanowski (1920–1975) was a French film actor and film producer. He is also known as Gilbert Boka. He played King Louis XVI three times for Sacha Guitry.

== Selected filmography ==
=== Actor ===
Year	Title	Role	Notes
1954	Royal Affairs in Versailles	Louis XVI	
1954	Madame du Barry	Minor rôle	Uncredited
1955	Napoléon	Marchand / Louis XVI	Uncredited
1956	If Paris Were Told to Us	Louis XVI	
1956	Le Pays d'où je viens		
1956	Assassins et Voleurs	Naquet / L'aumônier de la prison	Uncredited
1957	Les trois font la paire	M. Duval	
1958	Life Together	Roland Sauvage	(final film role)

=== Producer ===
- Life Together (1958)

== Bibliography ==
- Hayward, Susan. Simone Signoret: The Star as Cultural Sign. A&C Black, 2004.
