= Paris Still Sings =

1951 film

- Directed by: Pierre Montazel
- Written by: Jacques Chabannes; Clément Duhour; Roger Féral
- Produced by: Clément Duhour
- Starring: Lucien Baroux; Clément Duhour; Madeleine Lebeau
- Cinematography: Armand Thirard
- Edited by: Paulette Robert
- Music by: Raymond Legrand
- Production company: Courts et Longs Métrages
- Distributed by: Cocinor
- Release date: 29 November 1951
- Running time: 102 minutes
- Country: France
- Language: French

Paris Still Sings (French: Paris chante toujours) is a 1951 French musical comedy film directed by Pierre Montazel and starring Lucien Baroux, Clément Duhour and Madeleine Lebeau with performances from a large number of leading French singers.

== Cast ==
- Les Compagnons de la Chanson Themselves / En personne
- André Dassary as himself / En personne
- Georges Guétary as himself / En personne
- Luis Mariano as himself / En personne
- Yves Montand as himself / En personne
- Édith Piaf as herself / En personne
- Line Renaud as herself / En personne
- Tino Rossi as himself / En personne
- Jean Sablon as himself / En personne
- Georges Ulmer as himself / En personne
- Angelvin
- Frédéric Bart
- Léon Belières as Le président des vieux comédiens
- Michel de Bonnay
- Charles Camus
- Christine Carère as La partenaire de Tino Rossi
- Christine Chesnay as La femme blonde
- Jean Clarieux
- Marguerite Deval
- Denis d'Inès as Le maître d'hôtel
- Pierre Magnier
- Maryse Martin as La concierge
- Marcel Melrac as Un policier
- Frédéric O'Brady as Le concierge
- Philippe Olive as Le ministre
- Jean Ozenne as Le partenaire de Line Renaud
- Janine Marsay
- Van Doude
- Lucien Baroux as Clodomir
- Clément Duhour as Gilbert
- Madeleine Lebeau as Gisèle
- Perrette Souplex as Pierrette
- Raymond Souplex as himself / En personne
- Les Petites poulbots de Montmartre as Themselves / En personne
- Les Pensionnaires de la maison de retraite de Ris Orangis as Themselves / En personne
- Henri Cote
- Arthur Devère as Le commissaire
- Guy Henry
- Jacqueline Joubert
- Yvonne Legeay
- Fred Mella as himself / En personne
- Albert Michel as Un agent
- Geneviève Morel as La femme de Raoul
- Evelyn Nattier
- Jean-Claude Rameau
- Edouard Rousseau

== Bibliography ==
- Simon Frith. Popular Music: Critical Concepts in Media and Cultural Studies, Volume 2. Psychology Press, 2004.
