= Life Together (film) =

1958 film

- Directed by: Clément Duhour
- Written by: Clément Duhour; Sacha Guitry
- Produced by: Gilbert Bokanowski; Clément Duhour
- Starring: Fernandel; Danielle Darrieux; Sophie Desmarets
- Cinematography: Robert Lefebvre
- Edited by: Paulette Robert
- Music by: Hubert Rostaing
- Production companies: C.L.M. Cocinor
- Distributed by: Cocinor
- Release date: 24 September 1958
- Running time: 100 minutes
- Country: France
- Language: French
- Box office: 2,679,987 admissions (France)

Life Together (French: La Vie à deux) is a 1958 French comedy film directed by Clément Duhour. It features an ensemble star cast including Fernandel, Pierre Brasseur Lilli Palmer, Danielle Darrieux, Jean Marais, Edwige Feuillère, Gérard Philipe and Sophie Desmarets. The screenplay was written by Sacha Guitry, his final work before his death the same year.

It was shot at the Billancourt Studios in Paris and on location in Nice including at the Hotel Negresco. The film's sets were designed by the art director Raymond Gabutti.

== Synopsis ==
A celebrated writer has made a fortune by writing a successful book about four loving couples. Many years later he considers leaving them money in his will and sends out researchers to find if they are still as happy at they once were.

== Cast ==
- Pierre Brasseur as Pierre Carreau
- Danielle Darrieux as Monique Lebeaut
- Sophie Desmarets as Marguerite Caboufigue, wife of Marcel
- Fernandel as Marcel Caboufigue, the husband of Marguerite
- Edwige Feuillère as Françoise Sellier, ex-Carreau
- Robert Lamoureux as Thierry Raval, the lover of Monica
- Louis de Funès as Maître Stéphane, the notary
- Jean Marais as Teddy Brooks, the illusionist
- Lilli Palmer as Odette de Starenberg, the minister's girlfriend
- Gérard Philipe as Désiré, Odette's new valet
- Jean Richard as André Le Lorrain
- Pauline Carton as Mrs Vattier, wife of directeur
- Mathilde Casadesus as Adèle, cuisine of Odette
- Marie Daëms as Madeleine
- Ivan Desny as Michel Sellier
- Jacques Dumesnil as Professor Henri Girane
- Christian Duvaleix as Jean Pommier, généalogiste
- Jacques Jouanneau as Sentis, généalogiste
- Madeleine Lebeau as Peggy
- Robert Manuel as Georges
- Jane Marken as Madame Fourneau
- Maria Mauban as La soeur-infirmière
- Pierre Mondy as Monsieur Lebeaut
- Jacques Morel as Claude
- Jean Tissier as Arthur Vattier
- Palmyre Levasseur as Marie
- Raoul Marco as Doctor Leclerc

== Bibliography ==
- Harding, James. Sacha Guitry: the Last Boulevardier. Methuen, 1968.
