= School for Love =

1955 film by Marc Allégret

- Directed by: Marc Allégret
- Written by: Marc Allégret] Roger Vadim
- Based on: Eingang zur Bühne (The Entrance to the Stage); 1920 novel by Vicki Baum
- Produced by: Gilbert Cohen-Seat
- Starring: Jean Marais; Brigitte Bardot
- Cinematography: Robert Juillard
- Edited by: Suzanne de Troeye
- Music by: Jean Wiener
- Production companies: Régie du Film; Del Duca Films
- Distributed by: Columbia Pictures
- Release date: 26 April 1955 (France)
- Running time: 96 minutes
- Country: France
- Language: French
- Box office: $7.1 million

School for Love (Futures vedettes) is a 1955 French drama film directed by Marc Allégret, written by Marc Allégret, and starring Brigitte Bardot and Jean Marais. The screenplay, based on a novel by Vicki Baum was adapted for the screen by Allégret.

The film was released under different titles in various countries: Joy of Living or School for Love in the U.S., Sweet Sixteen in the U.K. and Reif auf junge Blüten in West Germany.

== Plot ==
Tenor Eric Walter, a teacher at a Vienna conservatory, is separated from his wife, opera singer Marie. When he starts a romantic relationship with one of his students, Sophie, another student named Elisa becomes jealous, leading to a complex web of emotions and conflicts.

== Cast ==
- Jean Marais as Éric Walter
- Brigitte Bardot as Sophie
- Isabelle Pia as Élis (Élisa)
- Yves Robert as Clément
- Denise Noël as Marie Koukowska-Walter
- Mischa Auer (crédité Misha Auer) as Berger
- Lila Kedrova as la mère de Sophie
- Edmond Beauchamp as le père d’Élis
- Yvette Etiévant as la mère d’Élis
- Georges Reich as Dick
- Anne Colette as Marion
- Odile Rodin as Erika
- Mylène Demongeot as The vocalist

== Reception ==
The film performed poorly at the French box office, with only 949,416 admissions.

Variety wrote "Title does not look prophetic, with Brigitte Bardot lacking any depth as yet for star stamping."
