= Beyond the Universe (2022 film) =

Brazilian drama film

- Brazilian Portuguese: Depois do Universo
- Directed by: Diego Freitas
- Screenplay by: Diego Freitas; Ana Reber; Rodrigo Azevedo; João Côrtes
- Produced by: Luciano Reck; André Carreira
- Starring: Giulia Be; Henry Zaga; João Miguel; Othon Bastos; Leo Bahia; Viviane Araújo; Denise Del Vecchio
- Music by: Ed Côrtes
- Distributed by: Netflix
- Release date: 27 October 2022
- Running time: 127 minutes
- Country: Brazil
- Language: Portuguese

Depois do Universo (English: Beyond the Universe) is a 2022 Brazilian drama film written and directed by Diego Freitas and produced by Camisa Listrada. The feature starring Giulia Be and Henry Zaga had its world premiere on October 27 on the Netflix streaming platform. It co-stars Leo Bahia, Viviane Araújo, Othon Bastos and João Miguel. In less than 24 hours the film had already reached the Top 10 of the platform's most consumed productions of the week. The feature shared the ranking with Brazilian production Esposa de Aluguel, a comedy starring Thati Lopes.

== Plot ==
Talented pianist Nina Soares started playing at eight, and wanted to join the symphony orchestra from 14. At that age she collapses during an important recital, and is soon diagnosed with lupus.

Now a young adult, Nina discovers the lupus has damaged her kidneys so severely they are working at under 10%, so is put on a kidney donor list and must undergo four hours of dialysis three times a week. There are over 14,000 people before her on the list.

After a month, Nina is scheduled to start dialysis. That morning, she sees the São Paulo Symphony Orchestra is seeking a piano soloist. After teaching a lesson at the music conservatory, Nina is warily OKed to practise after hours, but her work mustn't suffer.

Nina plays piano in the train station by the hospital, as Gabriel is passing through on his bike. Mesmerized, he crashes into the piano. Unimpressed, Nina stops, heading to the hospital.

Gabriel is a resident doctor at Nina's hospital. There, he is constantly brightening up patients' days. Gabriel and fellow resident Yuri compare notes on their crushes, one the chance encounter in the station and the other through an app.

The next day Nina finds Gabriel on her medical team, and is surprised by the strong connection they have. Initially she is very pessimistic, but he insists she keep fighting. Gabriel finds her a practise piano when the conservatory fires her, then rushes her across town to apply for the audition.

Hospital director Doctor Alberto summons Gabriel, who is also his son, reminding him of his hippocratic oath, because of Nina. The young adults end up making a trade, he teaches her to cycle while she teaches him to play piano, afterwards they go dancing and kiss.

During her long dialysis sessions, Nina befriends Amanda, who's under the same treatment. An optimist, she attributes her attitude to her daughter. Observing the chemistry between Nina and Gabriel, she predicts her young friend's outlook might be improving.

Although the pain from the lupus makes her hands ache, Nina practises through the pain and gets to the first audition. Initially pausing after a shooting pain, she powers through and passes to the second round. Gabriel invites Nina to a celebratory dinner.

Yuri, also Gabriel's roommate, preps dinner. His love interest Tulio arrives before Nina, and he mildly irritates Gabriel, who gets them to leave so he can be alone with Nina. She spends the night, and in the morning he tells her about a hike he does annually to honor his mother, his inspiration who died of cancer when he was 13.

Alberto confronts Gabriel about secretly getting tested to donate his kidney to Nina, which Gabriel then shares with her the negative result. Although he'd planned to attend Nina's second audition, Gabriel unexpectedly has to do clinic hours. He crashes his bike hurrying to get there, just as she collapses at the piano.

Nina wakes three days later in the hospital, dejected. When she realizes Gabriel might lose his residency due to their inappropriate doctor-patient relationship, she gets discharged without telling him. Finding her at home, Nina pessimistally doesn't want to request an appeal with the orchestra or stay together. She suggests he apologize to the disciplinary hearing committee.

When Nina tells Amanda what happened, she calls her an idiot for not fighting for Gabriel. So, she goes to his hearing and convinces them to keep him on, taking full responsibility for their interaction. Gabriel then gets Nina to go to the hospital, allegedly for Amanda's birthday. The chapel is set up with a piano, so she performs for one of the orchestra's jurors, who offers her another audition.

Gabriel soon leaves for his annual hiking trip, but first gives Nina his mother's lucky necklace to protect her. On the top of the mountain, he suffers a great fall. Although rushed to the hospital, Gabriel contracts a subdermal hematoma and passes away in the operating room. Nina and Alberto bond over their grief for Gabriel. The director discovers he is compatible to donate his kidney to her.

One year later, on stage with the São Paulo orchestra, Nina dedicates a song she wrote in Gabriel's honor.

== Cast ==
- Giulia Be as Nina Soares
- Henry Zaga as Gabriel
- Othon Bastos as Joaquim Soares.
- Viviane Araújo as Amanda.
- Leo Bahia as Yuri
- João Miguel as Alberto
- Denise Del Vecchio as Emília Borba
- Isabel Fillardis as Doctor Simone
- Rita Assemany as Raimunda
- Adriana Lessa as Lurdes
- Chan Suan como as Huang
- Giselle Prattes as Bianca
- Guilherme Rodio as Eduardo
- Luiza Dantas as Lara
- Matheus Ribeiro as Túlio
- Sérgio Menezes as Doctor Antônio Borges

=== Dubbing ===
- Doug Stone as Joaquim Soares (Othon Bastos)
- Wolfie Trausch as Yuri (Leo Bahia)
- Christopher Swindle as Alberto (João Miguel)
- Sophia Thomas as Doctor Simone (Isabel Fillardis)

==== Additional voices ====
- Iara Nemirovsky
- Ashleigh Morghan
- Ayaamii Sledge
- Brian D. Mason
- Gabriel Souza
- Jody Carlisle
- Courtney Taylor
- Erin Coker
- Tinser Korel
- Michael Sorich
- Christian Albert
- Paula Tiso

==== Technical sheet ====
- Studio: VSI - Los Angeles
- Dubbing Director: Hermes Baroli
- Adapter: Mia Ruf
- Recordist: Cameron Sloan
- Production Supervisor: Diego Diniz
- Editor: Mirage Zampriollo
- Mixer: Serge Perron

==== Notes ====
- Giulia Be and Henry Zaga dubbed themselves in English.

== Release ==
The film was released on Netflix on October 27, 2022. Immediately, the movie gained a lot of traction on the platform, reaching a place among the most watched in several countries. In Brazil, it was in the top 10 in its opening week and remained there for eight weeks.
