= If Paris Were Told to Us =

1956 film

Si Paris nous était conté
- Directed by: Sacha Guitry
- Written by: Sacha Guitry
- Produced by: Gilbert Bokanowski
- Starring: Françoise Arnoul; Danielle Darrieux; Sacha Guitry; Robert Lamoureux; Jean Marais; Michèle Morgan; Gérard Philipe
- Cinematography: Philippe Agostini
- Edited by: Paulette Robert
- Music by: Jean Françaix
- Production companies: Courts et Longs Métrages (C.L.M.); F.L.F. Société Nouvelle des Établissements Gaumont (SNEG)
- Distributed by: Société des Etablissements L. Gaumont
- Release date: 27 January 1956
- Running time: 130 minutes
- Country: France
- Budget: $3 million
- Box office: 2,8113,682 admissions (France)

If Paris Were Told to Us (French: Si Paris nous était conté) is a 1956 French historical film directed and written by Sacha Guitry. The admissions in France were 2,813,682 people.

== Summary ==
If Paris Were Told to Us is a historical film about the French capital, Paris, from the founding of the city to the significant events shaping its history. Narrated by Guitry himself, the film journeys through events and features historical figures prominent in shaping the city's history. From King Charles VII to the assassination of King Henry III, and to the creation of printing and the construction of the Louvre Palace, the film depicts how the French capital came to be.

== Principal cast ==
- Françoise Arnoul as Duchesse de L...
- Jeanne Boitel as Mme Geoffrin / Sarah Bernhardt
- Gilbert Bokanowski as Louis XVI
- Julien Carette as Un cocher
- Danielle Darrieux as Agnès Sorel
- Sophie Desmarets as Rose Bertin
- Clément Duhour as Aristide Bruant
- Sacha Guitry as Louis XI
- Odette Joyeux as La Passementiere
- Robert Lamoureux as Latude
- Jacques Dumesnil as Cardinal Richelieu
- Pierre Larquey as Pierre Broussel
- Jean Marais as François Ier
- Jean Martinelli as Henri IV / Firmin
- Lana Marconi as La reine Marie-Antoinette
- Michèle Morgan as Gabrielle d'Estrées
- Jean Parédès as Un médecin
- Giselle Pascal as Comtesse de G...
- Gérard Philipe as Le Trouvère
- Odile Rodin as the Princess of Essling
- Claude Sylvain as Catherine de Médicis jeune
