= Ferrari 250 GT California Spyder =

Sports car

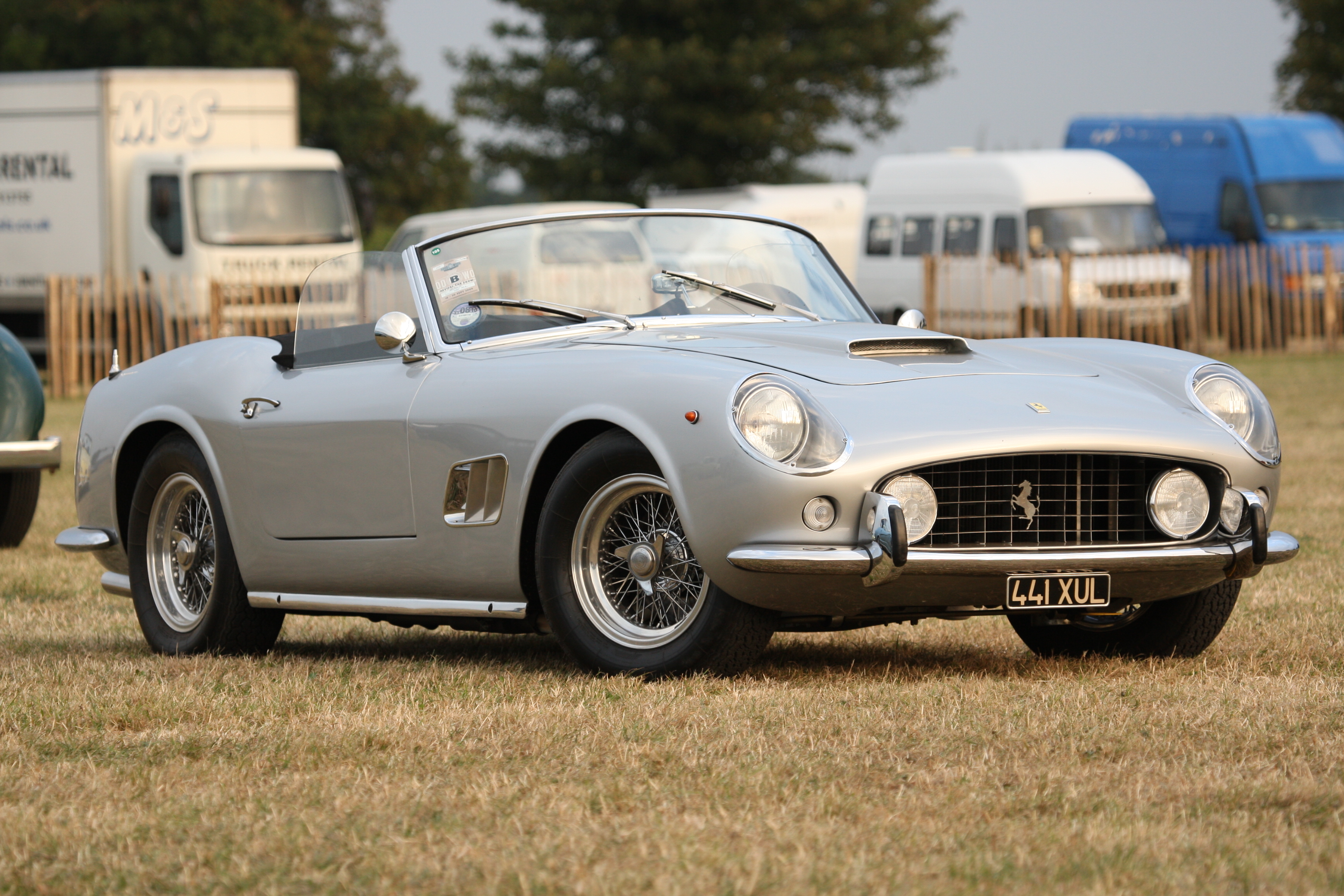
- Ferrari 250 GT California Spyder SWB at the Goodwood Revival 2009.

Overview
- Manufacturer: Ferrari
- Production: 1957–1963 (106 produced)
- Assembly: Italy: Modena (Carrozzeria Scaglietti)
- Designer: Sergio Scaglietti

Body and chassis
- Class: Sports car
- Body style: 2-door roadster
- Layout: Longitudinally-mounted, front mid-engine, rear-wheel-drive
- Related: Ferrari 250 GT Berlinetta

Powertrain
- Engine: 3.0 L (2953.21 cc) Colombo Tipo 128 and 168 V12
- Transmission: 4-speed manual

Dimensions
- Wheelbase: 2,600 mm (102.4 in) (LWB); 2,400 mm (94.5 in) (SWB)
- Curb weight: 1,100 kg (2,425 lb) (dry)

Chronology
- Successor: Ferrari 275 GTS

The Ferrari 250 GT California Spyder is a sports car developed by the Italian automotive company Ferrari. It is presented by the brand as Ferrari 250 Gran Turismo Spyder California or simply Ferrari 250 California. It was designed by Sergio Scaglietti, who adapted the styling of the 250 GT Pinin Farina, and was produced by Carrozzeria Scaglietti. The model gained considerable recognition following its appearance in the 1986 film Ferris Bueller's Day Off.

The 250 GT California Spyder is a convertible version of the contemporary Berlinetta. It is powered by the traditional Ferrari V12 engine and was produced in approximately 100 units, nearly equally split between Long-wheelbase (LWB) versions from 1957 to 1960 and short wheelbase (SWB) versions from 1960 to 1963.

== Context and background ==
The growing American interest in European auto racing and the popularity of smaller sports cars led to a significant increase in sales of European sports car manufacturers in the United States. This trend prompted Ferrari, along with other European manufacturers, to consider developing models tailored specifically for the American market.

The success of convertible sports cars, especially in California, led to interest from American dealers such as Jon von Neumann and Luigi Chinetti to advocate for Ferrari to produce a sporty convertible designed for American consumers. They identified a demand for a more aggressive convertible, a market segment not sufficiently addressed by the luxurious 250 GT Cabriolet Pinin Farina. In an interview, Chinetti explains "that in Italy it was difficult for the company to seriously consider a convertible as a sports car". (Note: Original quote, "In Italy, it was difficult for the factory to understand that a convertible was a serious fast car. ")

Initially, Enzo Ferrari was hesitant to produce the California model, as the popular 250 GT Cabriolet Pinin Farina was already in the lineup. However, had he rejected Chinetti and Neumann's proposal, it is likely they would have converted the 250 GT Berlinetta "Tour de France" or SWB into a spider with Scaglietti's assistance, a practice they later employed in 1967 with some Ferrari 275 GTB/4 models.

The 250 GT California Spyder was created to appeal to American consumers, particularly those in California, as reflected in its name. This model effectively combined race car performance with custom specifications, sustaining interest in the car over the years. The prototype was introduced in 1957, and series production commenced in the second quarter of 1958.

At the 1960 Geneva International Motor Show, the 250 GT California Spyder transitioned from the long chassis of the Ferrari 250 GT Berlinetta "Tour de France", which had a wheelbase of 2.60 meters, to a short chassis version with a reduced wheelbase of 2.40 meters. This change aimed to enhance the car's performance, particularly its cornering capabilities.

== Exterior appearance ==
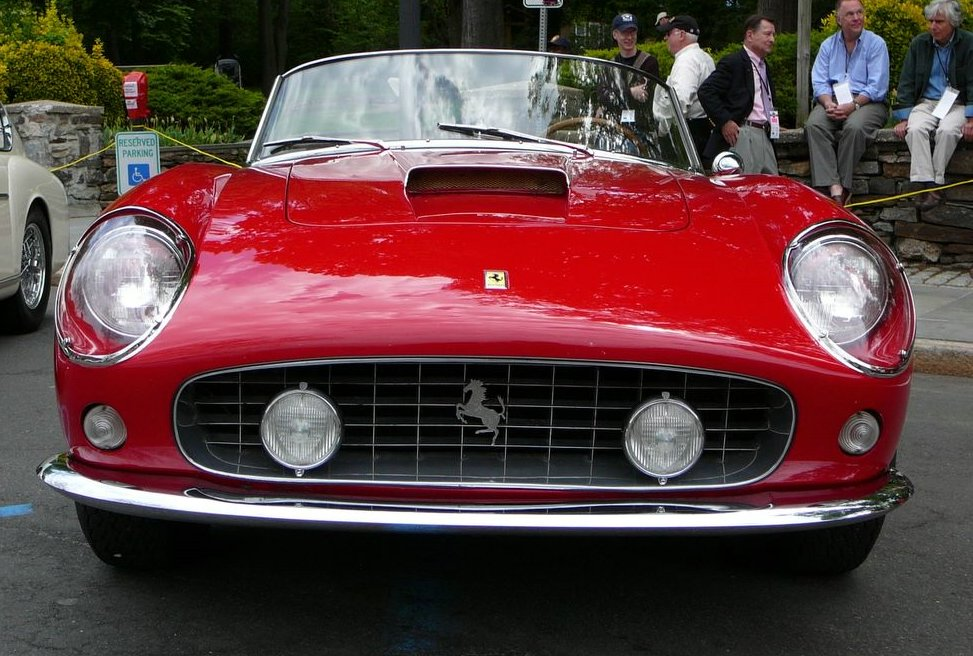
A Ferrari 250 GT California Spyder LWB with fairing headlights.

The design of the California, noted for its influence in automotive styling, was created by Sergio Scaglietti. Aesthetically, it closely resembles the luxurious Ferrari 250 GT Cabriolet Pinin Farina Series I, produced in the same year, but the California Spyder is characterized by a more slender profile. Its fluid body lines extend from the front lights to the curves of the wings, complemented by an aggressive "shark mouth" grille.

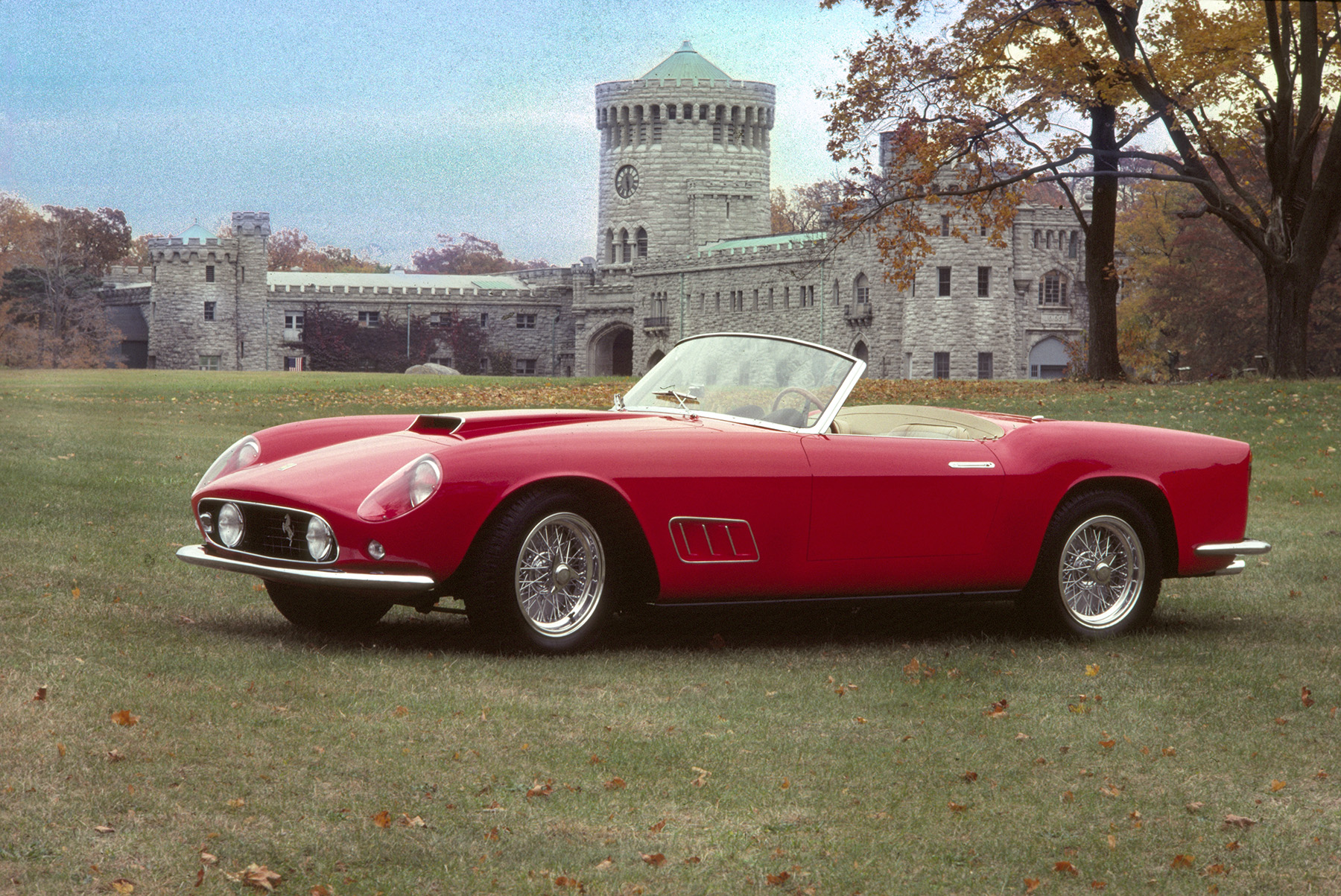
1959 Ferrari 250 GT LWB California Spyder

Based on the berlinetta, the California Spyder retains many of its aesthetic features, including the distinctive "hip recess" in front of the rear wheels. The windshield slope is more pronounced due to its convertible design.

In 1960, the adoption of the short chassis from the 250 GT Berlinetta SWB resulted in more compact proportions that enhanced the muscular silhouette of the California. The two versions of the California (SWB and LWB) can be distinguished by the design of the air intake on the hood, which supplies air to the carburetors; the SWB version features a half-recessed intake.

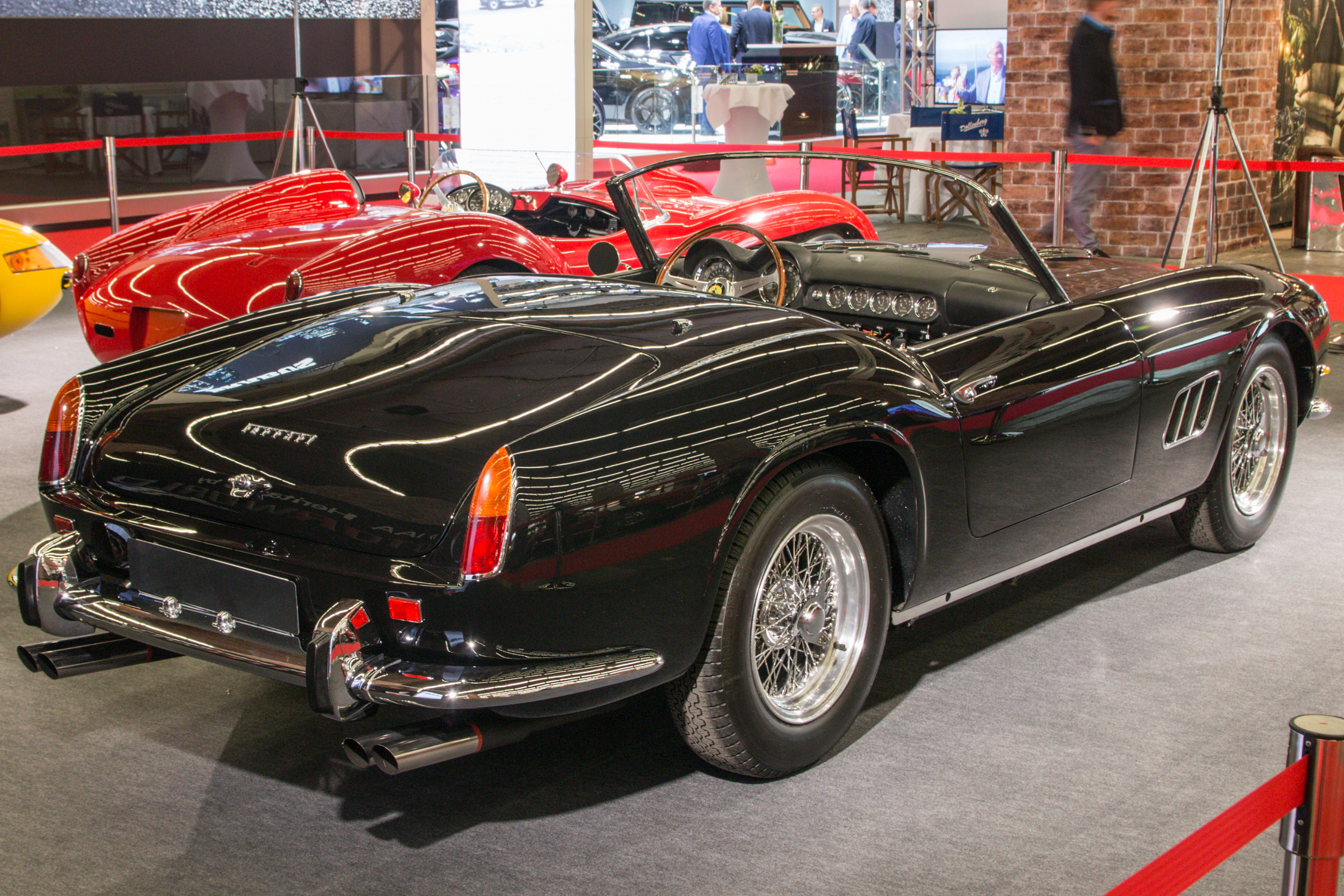
Ferrari 250 GT SWB California Spyder rear

The 250 GT California Spyder was hand-built by Carrozzeria Scaglietti at its workshop in Modena, a common practice for most Ferrari competition models of that era. Although Pinin Farina was known for its body designs, it was unable to produce the California Spyder due to other commitments.

In contrast to the Pinin Farina Cabriolet, Scaglietti chose Marchal headlights, which were enclosed in plexiglass, with fog lights integrated into the grille. Buyers of the California Spyder had the option to select projecting headlights; however, Italian regulations required the use of non-fairing headlights. Additionally, Scaglietti did not include a designated area for a license plate, necessitating that owners find their solutions to comply with local regulations.

== Interior ==
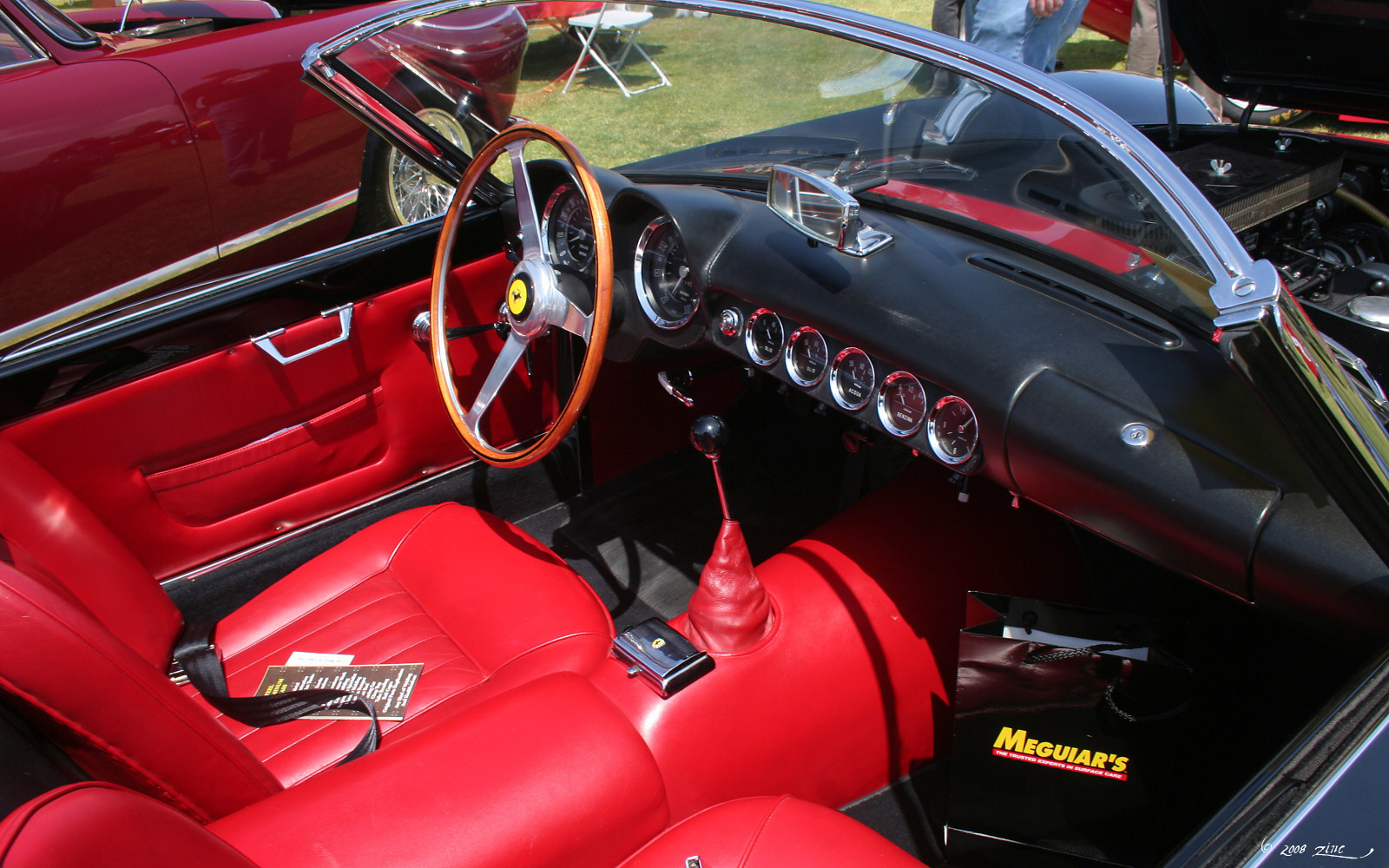
Interior of a 250 GT California Spyder SWB.

The interior of the 250 GT California Spyder, while similar in finish to that of the 250 GT Cabriolet Pinin Farina I, is characterized by a minimalist design that prioritizes functionality over luxury, resulting in a simpler and more utilitarian appearance.

The dashboard features seven circular dials, including the tachometer and the rev counter, providing essential information about engine operation. In the long wheelbase (LWB) version, these dials are positioned behind a three-spoke Nardi steering wheel, crafted from wood and aluminum. In contrast, the short wheelbase (SWB) version displays the dials in a linear arrangement on the dashboard.

== Chassis, brakes and suspensions ==
The Ferrari 250 GT California Spyder shares its chassis and drivetrain with the 250 GT "Tour de France." It features an independent suspension with superimposed triangles and coil springs at the front, while the rear is equipped with a rigid axle, suspended by leaf springs and guided by four push struts and link shocks. In 1960, telescopic shock absorbers replaced the Houdaille torsion bars at the front.

The chassis underwent detailed evolution alongside that of the "Tour de France" berlinetta and, in May 1960, adopted a significant wheelbase change introduced on the 250 GT Berlinetta SWB. This adjustment reduced the wheelbase to 2,400 mm, allowing for wider tracks and lower ground clearance.

The tubular chassis supports bodywork primarily made of steel, with aluminum doors. This design results in a weight approximately 100 kilograms heavier than that of the Berlinetta, a difference attributed to the need for structural reinforcement in the convertible design. While the car's weight is slightly over one ton, exact figures may vary among sources.

Braking was initially provided by drum brakes until October 1959, when the 250 GT California Spyder was upgraded to Dunlop disc brakes.

== Engine and transmission ==
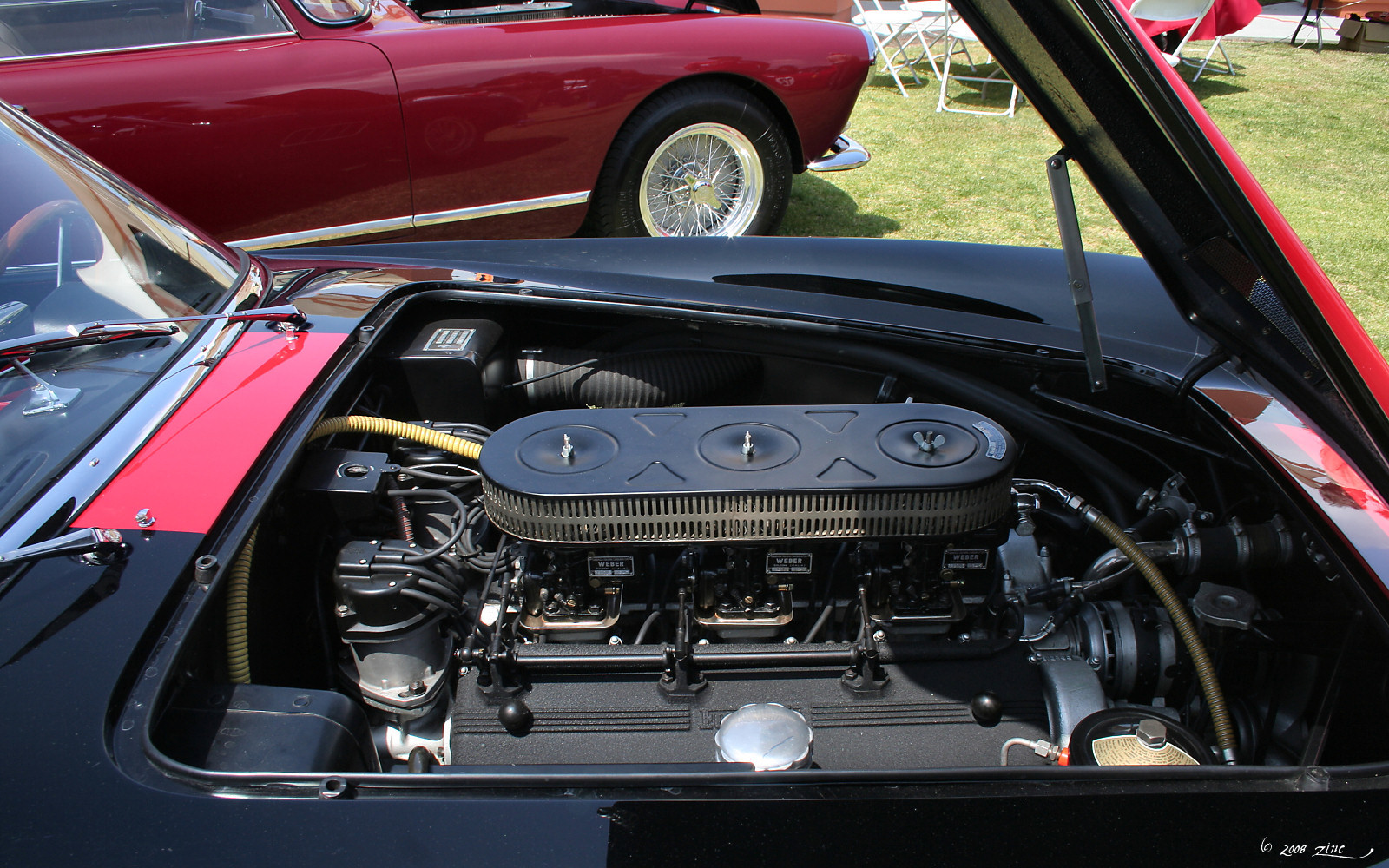
The traditional Ferrari "Colombo" 12 cylinder V engine.

The Ferrari 250 GT California Spyder is powered by the traditional Ferrari "Colombo" 12-cylinder V-engine (Type 168), constructed from light alloy and featuring two overhead camshafts with two valves per cylinder. This engine, named after its designer, Gioacchino Colombo, has been utilized across the entire 250 series since 1952.

Configured at a 60° angle, the engine has a displacement of 2,953 cm³, with a bore and stroke of 73 mm × 58.8 mm. It is equipped with three Weber double-barrel carburetors, initially 36 millimeters in size, increasing to 42 millimeters from 1960 onward. The engine initially produced 240 hp at 7,000 rpm for the long wheelbase (LWB) version, which was subsequently upgraded to 280 hp with the introduction of the short wheelbase (SWB) version, owing to new cylinder heads and larger valves. It is paired with a 4-speed gearbox, known for its docility, availability, and reliability.

In 1960, spark plugs were relocated outside the V configuration, similar to the 250 Testa Rossa, to facilitate maintenance. Additionally, an overdrive was incorporated into the gearbox. The front air intake is typically supplemented by two side vents featuring three polished aluminum slots, located behind the front wheels, which assist in engine ventilation.

== Competition ==
Although the Ferrari 250 GT California Spyder was not specifically designed for competition, many models participated in endurance races. It won the 12 Hours of Sebring in 1959, driven by Richie Ginther and Howard Hively, and again in 1960 with Giorgio Scarlatti, Fabrizio Serena, and Carlo Abate. Additionally, a California Spyder from the North American Racing Team, driven by Bob Grossman and Fernand Tavano, secured fifth place in the 1959 24 Hours of Le Mans. Some California Spyders were also equipped with the engine from the "Competizione" berlinettes, the sportier versions of the series.

== At Auction ==
The 250 GT California Spyder is often noted for its aesthetic appeal among Ferrari models and cabriolets in automotive history. It is also one of the most valuable cars; on May 18, 2008, television host Chris Evans purchased a model previously owned by actor James Coburn for a record price of €7,040,000 at the "Ferrari Legends and Passions" auction organized by Sotheby's.

On February 6, 2015, a short chassis version of the 250 GT California, previously owned by Roger Baillon and lost to history for nearly 30 years, was sold at the Artcurial auction during the Retromobile show for €14,200,000 (excluding auction fees). This particular vehicle had a notable history, having belonged to several French movie stars, including Alain Delon, and was discovered under a pile of newspapers alongside a Maserati A6G GranSport.

At 2025 Monterey Car Week Gooding Christie’s auctioned one of two alloy-bodied, full competition spec SWB California Spider for $25,305,000

Sporty convertibles, such as the 250 GT California Spyder, continue to be a prominent feature in Ferrari's lineup. In 2008, the Ferrari California was introduced, showcasing design elements reminiscent of the 250 GT California Spyder.

== See also ==
- List of Ferrari road cars
- Lancia Aurelia
- Mercedes-Benz 300 SL
- Aston Martin DB4 GT Zagato

== Bibliography ==
- Michael Bowler, Giuseppe Guzzardi and Enzo Rizzo (2003). Voitures de légende. Editions Gründ. pp. 623 p. ISBN 978-2-84459-078-7.
- Hartmut Lehbrink, Rainer W. Schlegelmilch and Jochen von Osterroth (2004). Ferrari. Paris: Editions Place des Victoires. pp. 408 p. ISBN 978-2-84459-078-7.
- Brian Laban (2009). Ferrarissime. Glénat, Editions Atlas. pp. 221 p. ISBN 978-2-7234-7314-9.
- Carrick, George Manton (1976). The Spyder California - A Ferrari of Particular Distinction. Veloce Enterprises. pp. 132 p. ISBN 978-1588500618.
