= Crossroads of Passion =

1948 film

- Directed by: Ettore Giannini; Henri Calef
- Written by: Jacques Companéez; Claude Heymann; Pierre Véry
- Produced by: Marcello D'Amico; Henry Deutschmeister; Robert Dorfmann
- Starring: Viviane Romance; Clément Duhour; Valentina Cortese
- Cinematography: Anchise Brizzi
- Edited by: Jacques Grassi; Raymonde Nevers
- Music by: Joseph Kosma
- Production companies: Pao Film; Productions Jacques Companeez
- Distributed by: Les Films Corona (France); Fincine (Italy)
- Release date: 4 August 1948
- Running time: 108 minutes
- Countries: France; Italy
- Language: Italian

Crossroads of Passion (French: Carrefour des passions, Italian: Gli uomini sono nemici) is a 1948 French-Italian drama film directed by Ettore Giannini and Henri Calef and starring Viviane Romance, Clément Duhour and Valentina Cortese. The film's sets were designed by the art director Guido Fiorini.

== Synopsis ==
Lisbon, the capital of Neutral Portugal, is a hotbed of spies. Mario, a cabaret singer working for the Allies is responsible for the death of an Italian agent. His widow Irène heads to Portugal and in her desire for revenge she agrees to work for the Nazis.

== Cast ==
- Viviane Romance as Irène Dumesnil
- Clément Duhour as Mario de Falla
- Valentina Cortese as Maria Pilar
- Gina Falckenberg as Hilde von Baldur
- Fosco Giachetti as Toniani
- Aroldo Tieri as Franciolini
- Hans Hinrich as Fischer
- Jean Wall as Jean Claes
- Joop van Hulzen as Schmidt
- Olinto Cristina as Dr. Slaceck
- Sembt as Von Baldur
- Wanda Capodaglio
- Henri Charrett
- Andrea Checchi
- Riccardo Foti
- Marcello Giorda
- Folco Lulli
- Silvana Mangano
- Guido Notari
- Nico Pepe
- Franco Pesce

== Bibliography ==
- Manuel Palacio & Jörg Türschmann. Transnational Cinema in Europe. LIT Verlag Münster, 2013.
