= Ferrari 250 GT Cabriolet Pinin Farina =

Prestige sports car by Ferrari, 1957–1962

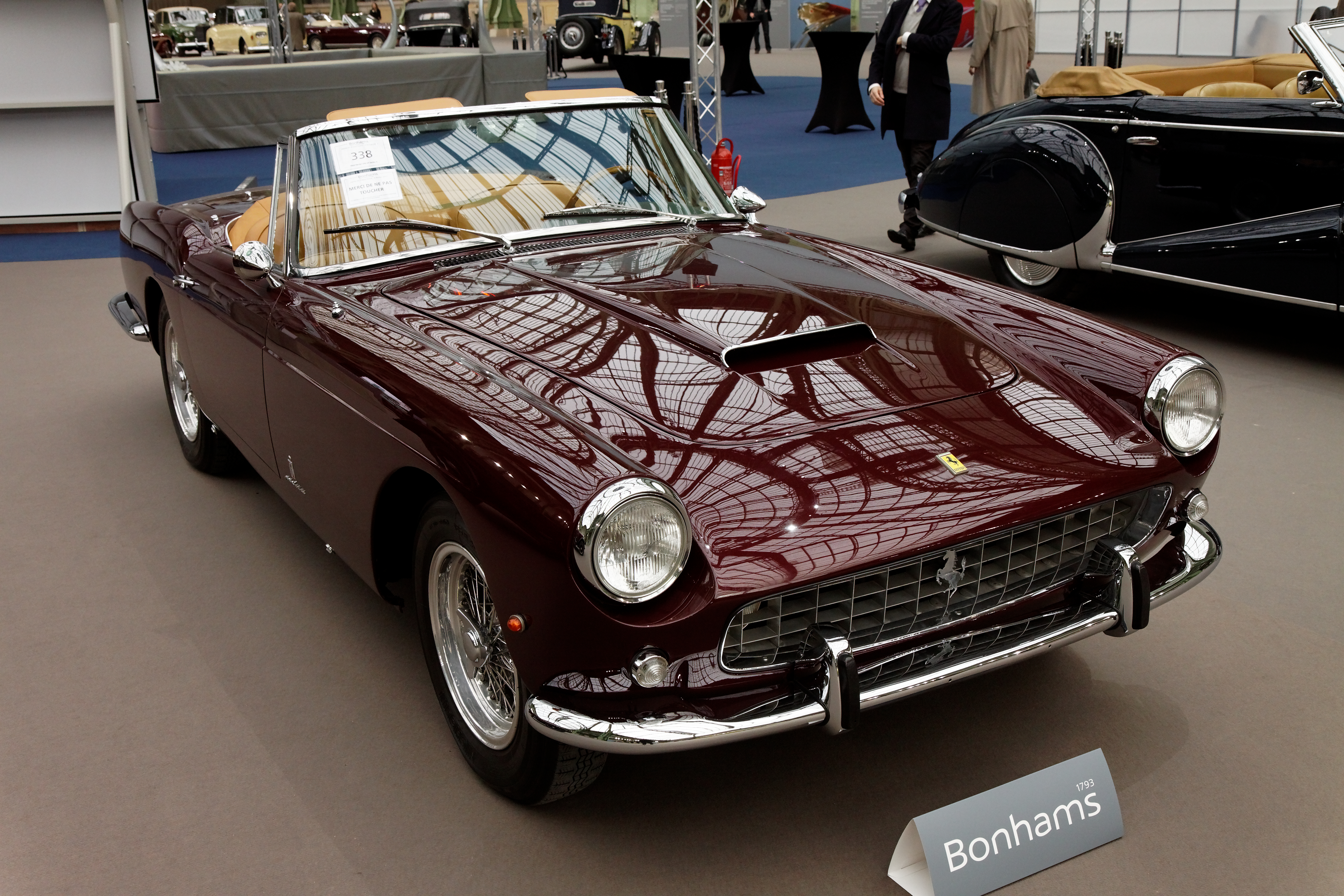
- A II series Ferrari 250 GT Cabriolet Pinin Farina on display at the Grand Palais

Overview
- Manufacturer: Ferrari
- Production: 1957–1962
- Designer: Carrozzeria Pinin Farina

Body and chassis
- Body style: cabriolet
- Layout: Longitudinally-mounted, Front-engine
- Related: Ferrari 250 GT Coupé

Powertrain
- Engine: 3.0 L (2953.21 cc) Colombo V12
- Power output: 240 PS
- Transmission: 4-speed manual

Dimensions
- Wheelbase: 2,600 mm (102.4 in)
- Length: 4,430 mm (174.4 in)
- Width: 1,980 mm (78.0 in)
- Height: 1,130 mm (44.5 in)
- Curb weight: 1,050 kg (2,315 lb)

Chronology
- Predecessor: Ferrari 212 Inter
- Successor: Ferrari 275 GTS

The Ferrari 250 GT Cabriolet Pinin Farina is a prestige sports car developed by the Italian carmaker Ferrari. A "cabriolet" version of the 250 GT Coupé, it was designed and bodied by Carrozzeria Pinin Farina of Turin.

Produced from July 1957 to the end of 1962, the 250 GT Cabriolet was Ferrari's first mass-produced cabriolet. Initially, only a small volume of around thirty models was assembled. Identified by the designation "first series" (in Italian, prima serie), these Ferraris gave way in July 1959 to a second version with a corrected design ("second series", in Italian seconda serie), which sold around 200 units, despite being the most expensive Ferrari 250 GT at the time.

== Context ==
In the second half of the 1950s, Ferrari moved away from the radically sporty models for which it is still famous, and began to produce more "standardized" prestige automobiles. Enzo Ferrari realized the importance of this type of car to his company's financial health. Indeed, the production of the 250 GT Boano/Ellena was already a major step in this direction. By producing the 250 GT Cabriolet Pinin Farina, the first cabriolet in its history to be built in series, Ferrari took another step in this direction. Although a few cabriolet models had been assembled in the past, none had ever been produced in large numbers. The production of a cabriolet was in fact a logical follow-up to the expansion of the Ferrari range, which in 1956 consisted of the Boano 250 GT coupé and the more sporty 250 GT Berlinetta Tour de France, with the aim of improving the distribution of its cars.

== Origins and evolution ==
In the beginning, it would be several years before the idea of a Ferrari 250 GT Cabriolet became a reality. In the meantime, several exhibition models were produced. The first was produced in 1953 by the Turin coachbuilder Pinin Farina, who used a Ferrari 250 Europa with a "Lampredi" engine as the basis for the chassis. Named "Ariowitch" after its first owner, this cabriolet was followed in 1956 by a second Europa GT-based cabriolet, designed by Mario Boano. Presented to the public at the Geneva International Motor Show, it wasn't until the following year and a final prototype, assembled by Pinin Farina on the chassis of a 250 GT, also presented at Geneva, that this series of exhibition models came to an end, giving birth to the first-series Pinin Farina 250 GT Cabriolet.

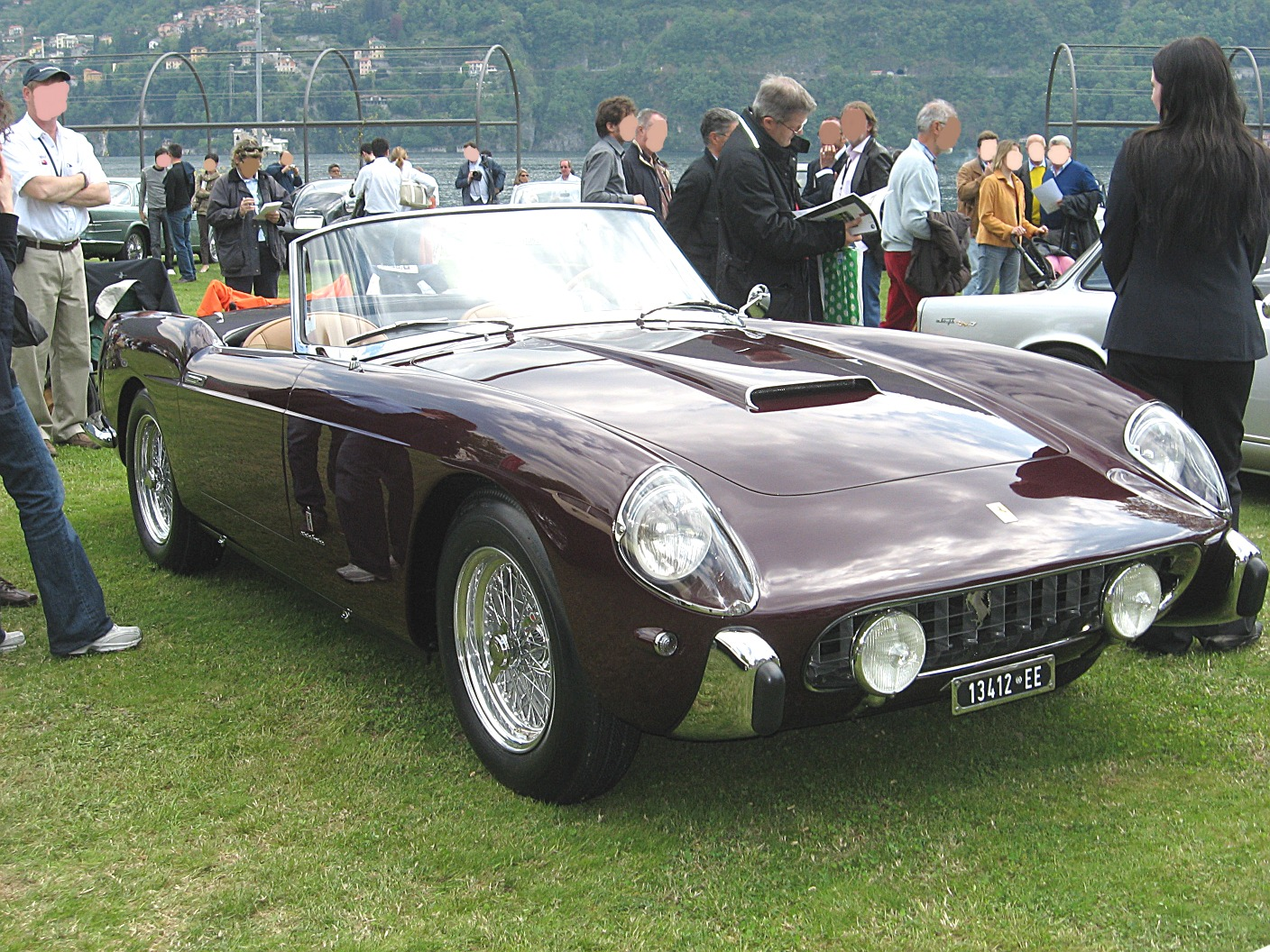
A first-series 250 GT Cabriolet, recognizable by its vertical bumpers.

Produced from July 1957, the 250 GT Cabriolet PF was first developed on the basis of a 250 GT Boano/Ellena and then, like the 250 GT California Spyder the following year, on that of the 250 GT Berlinetta "TdF". As the first series was a form of "pre-production", only around thirty examples were produced until July 1959. In October of the same year, the second-series 250 GT Cabriolet Pinin Farina was unveiled to the public at the Paris Motor Show, as Ferrari had long been accustomed to presenting its new models there. Some 200 examples of this more accomplished second series were produced until 1962.

This ramp-up in production was made possible by the relocation of Pinin Farina's production facilities to a new, larger and more modern plant in Grugliasco (a province of Turin), and the installation of a new elevated assembly line in the Ferrari factory.

== Exterior and interior appearance ==
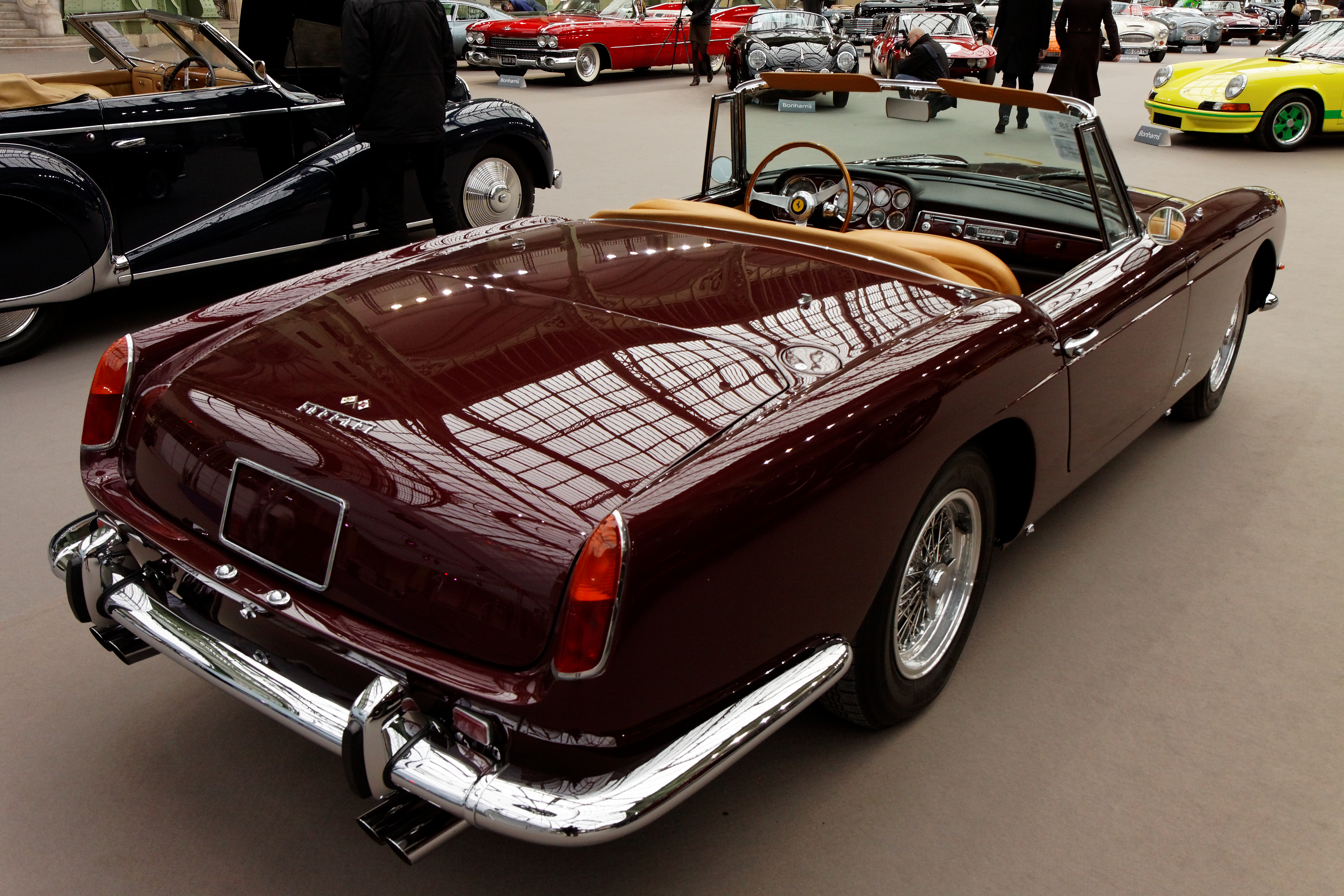
Stern of a second-series 250 GT Cabriolet PF

As has been his custom since 1952, Enzo Ferrari commissioned Pinin Farina from Turin to design the future Ferrari 250 GT Cabriolet. More surprisingly, however, he also entrusted Farina with the bodywork, a task usually assigned to Carrozzeria Scaglietti at the time: Ferrari wanted to increase the production rate of its cars, and consequently its sales.

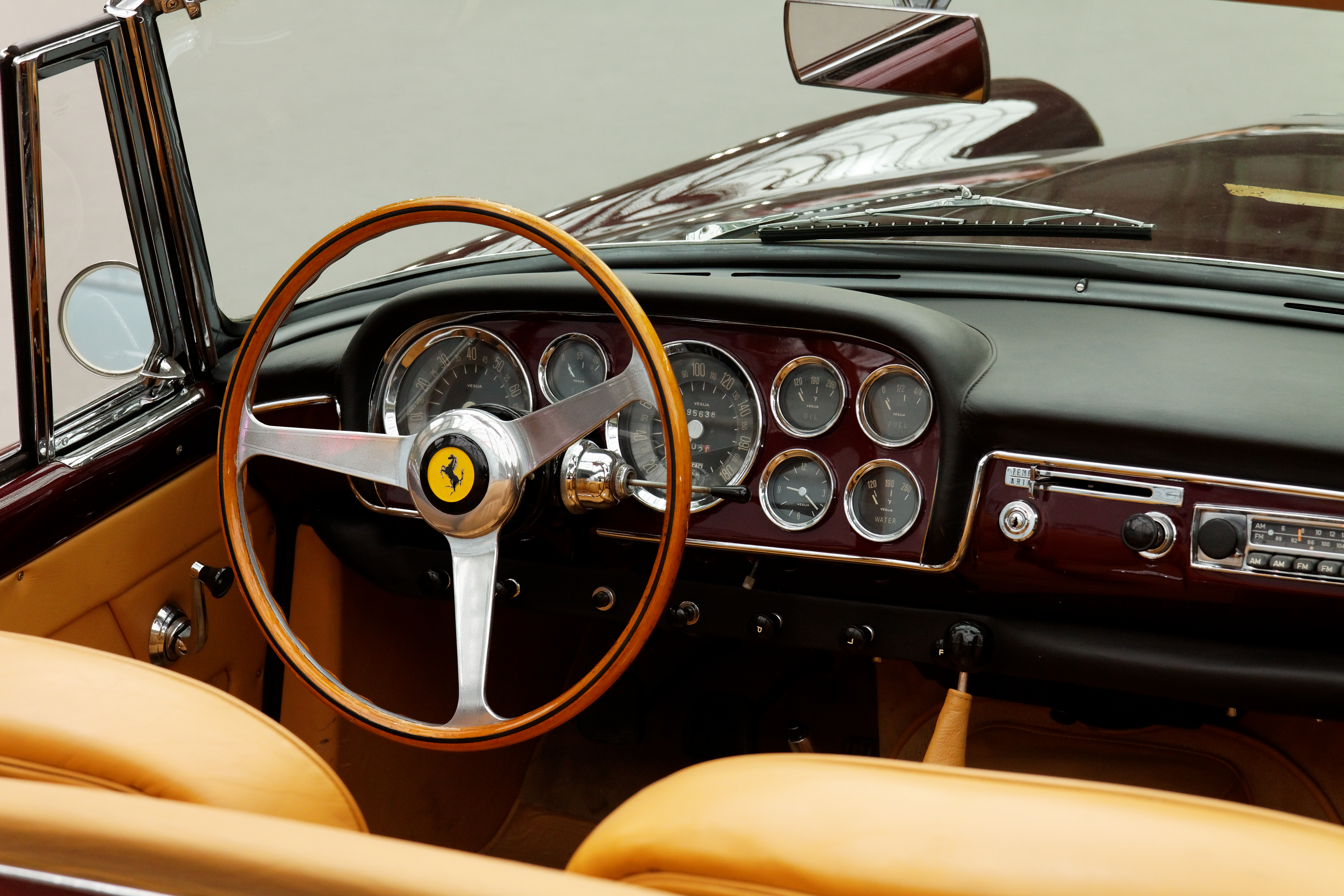
Interior cabin of a second-series 250 GT Cabriolet PF

In contrast to the Ferrari 250 GT California Spyder, produced the following year exclusively for the American market and with a sportier vocation, the emphasis was on comfort, refinement and interior luxury. The first series is aesthetically "remarkable", as are the interior equipment and soundproofing. It is easily recognized by its two imposing vertical bumpers on either side of the grille, and its two long-range headlamps in front of the grille. In 1958, the latter were moved behind the grille, while the low-beam headlamps, initially streamlined, were later replaced on the second series by conventional headlamps due to a change in legislation in Italy. Inside, behind the wooden Nardi steering wheel with three aluminum spokes, the instrument panel features seven circular dials, including the tachometer and rev counter, informing the driver of engine operation.

Finding the lines of this first series of 250 GT Cabriolet a little heavy, Pinin Farina decided in 1959 to correct the design. He took his inspiration from the latest Ferrari coupé, the 250 GT Coupé Pinin Farina, which he had been building for just over a year. The windshield is now higher and less sloping, and the side windows are larger. More space is also given to rear passengers, and the boot volume, already generous for two passengers' luggage, is increased. Pinin Farina also refined the lines of the canvas soft top, which from 1961 could be replaced by a removable hard top. Among the 200 or so second-series models produced, aesthetic differences were not uncommon; for example, some cars had large chrome-plated air vents behind the front wheel arches, while others did not.

== Engine and transmission ==
The powertrains of the "250 GT dynasty" are almost standardized. The 250 GT Cabriolet PF is powered by the traditional "Colombo" V12 engine, open at 60°, with a displacement of 2,953 cm3 (bore/stroke 73 mm × 58.8 mm). Three Weber double-barrel 36 DCL 3 (first series) and 40 DCL (second series) carburetors feed the engine, while timing is provided by two overhead camshafts, one for each bank of cylinders. In 1960, a number of new features were introduced: spark plugs were placed on the outside of the cylinder head for easier maintenance and longer life, and the cylinders were supplied with air via twelve independent intake ducts.

With a compression ratio varying between 8.5:1 and 9.5:1, the engine develops 240 hp, reached at 7,000 rpm, and 245 N m of torque. Equipped with a four-speed gearbox featuring overdrive, the 250 Cabriolet reaches a top speed of 240 km/h and accelerates from 0 to 100 km/h in around 7.1 s.

== Chassis, brakes and suspension ==
As with the engine, the technologies used for the chassis and suspension are now well known to Ferrari. The chassis is a tubular steel frame. The front suspension is independent, with superimposed double wishbones and coil springs; the rear is a rigid axle with semi-elliptic leaf springs and parallel trailing arms. Hydraulic telescopic shock absorbers are also used front and rear.

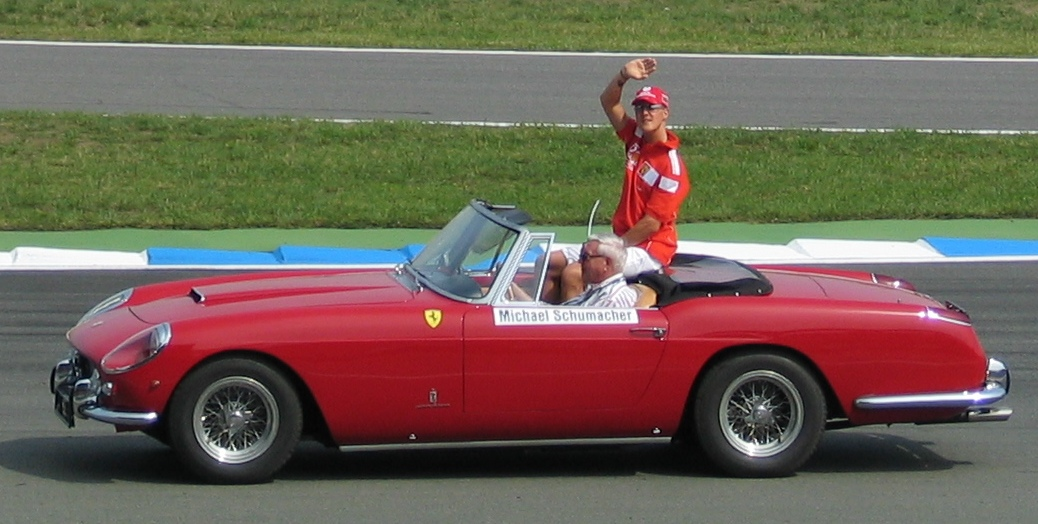
Michael Schumacher in a Ferrari 250 GT Cabriolet Pinin Farina at the drivers' parade at Hockenheim in 2004.

The braking system, on the other hand, abandons the classic drum brakes in favor of disc brakes. In fact, shortly after its presentation at the 1956 Geneva International Motor Show, Pinin Farina's latest show car was made available to the official Ferrari driver, Peter Collins, who used it in competition in England and had four Dunlop disc brakes fitted. This initiative was taken up a few years later by Enzo Ferrari for the 250 Testa Rossa, and soon, judging their effectiveness to be convincing, for all his cars.

== Posterity ==
While the 250 GT Cabriolet marked a real turning point in Ferrari's history, becoming the first of the manufacturer's models whose manufacturing process most closely resembled that of mass production, it was ultimately eclipsed in memory by another Ferrari, produced in parallel and yet aesthetically quite similar, but with a very different intended "personality": the 250 GT California Spyder.

== See also ==
- List of Ferrari road cars
- Ferrari 250 GT California Spyder
- Ferrari 275

== Bibliography ==
- Schlegelmilch, Rainer W.; Lehbrink, Hartmut; von Osterroth, Jochen (2004). Ferrari (in French). Paris. ISBN 978-2-84459-078-7.
- Laban, Brian (2009). Ferrarissime (in French) (Editions Atlas ed.). Glénat. ISBN 978-2-7234-7314-9. OCLC 717811030.
