= Clément Duhour =

French athlete

Clément Duhour was born in Saint-Jean d'Anglet, in the Aquitaine region of south-western France on 11 December 1911. He died on 3 January 1983 in Neuilly-sur-Seine. He was a French athlete, singer, actor, film director and producer.

== Biography ==
A French Basque, Clément Duhour was the son of a baker. He was also the younger brother of Édouard Duhour. At age 16, he won his first French national championships in both the shot put and discus. Almost simultaneously, he was expelled from the public high school in Bayonne for "indiscipline". Subsequently, his father sent him to Paris to become an apprentice salesman at the Félix Potin grocery store. Three days later, he quit the apprenticeship to become an entertainer at the Lapin Agile club under the stage name Guy Lormont. In 1932, he took part in the Summer Olympic Games in Los Angeles shot put competition, where he tossed well beyond the 45-foot mark without much training. His brother, Édouard, was also a French shot putter, who competed in the event at the Olympics the previous year. The following year, Clément was again crowned French national shot put champion.

During the German occupation of France, Duhour opens his own cabaret, Le Cavalier, on the Rue de Ponthieu, in the 8th arrondissement of Paris. He also starts his movie career as "Boris Ivanovitch" in L'Âge d'or directed by Jean de Limur. According to Hans von Luck, Duhour's cafe-inn was a cover for Resistance activities, thus hiding resisters behind a cloak of superficial compliance with the Germans. In 1942, Duhour met Viviane Romance and they married in 1943. Together they created the production company Izarra Films, "izarra" meaning "star" in Basque.

After the end of the Second World War, Clément Duhour becomes Sacha Guitry's regular producer and collaborator through his production company "CLM" (Courts et Longs Métrages), whose name is meant as a quasi-acronym of his first name, Clément ("Clem"). This association would prove fruitful in the 1950s with the production of a series of cinematographic masterpieces, like the cult classics Three Make a Pair, Lovers And Thieves or If Paris Were Told To Us.

Clément Duhour also paid tribute to Sacha Guitry's memory after his death in 1957 by directing and producing Life Together (La Vie à deux) in 1958.

He died "of natural causes" on January 3, 1983, in Neuilly. He was 71 years old.

== Filmography ==
=== As actor ===
Year	Title	Director	Notes
1941	The Golden Age	Jean de Limur	
1942	The Trump Card	Jacques Becker	
1945	La Route du bagne	Léon Mathot	
1946	La Colère des dieux	Karel Lamač	
1946	La Maison sous la mer	Henri Calef	
1948	Crossroads of Passion	Ettore Giannini	
1951	Passion	Georges Lampin	
1951	Paris Still Sings	Pierre Montazel	actor and producer
1952	Promenades à Paris	Stany Cordier	
1953	Saluti e baci - (La Route du bonheur)	Maurice Labro and Giorgio Simonelli	actor and producer
1953	L'Embarquement pour le ciel	Jean Aurel	
1953	Le Chemin de l'étoile	Jean Mousselle	
1953	La Montagne du bout du monde	Lionel Terray	
1953	Histoires de bicyclettes	Émile Roussel	
1954	Si Versailles m'était conté...	Sacha Guitry	actor and producer
1955	Napoléon	Sacha Guitry	actor and producer
1955	Si Paris nous était conté	Sacha Guitry	actor and producer

=== As director ===
Year	Title	Notes
1958	Life Together	director, writer, and producer
1959	You Have Nothing to Declare?	director and producer

=== Only as producer ===
Year	Title	Director	Notes
1956	Le Pays d'où je viens	Marcel Carné	
