= Édouard Duhour =

French shot putter (1905–1969)

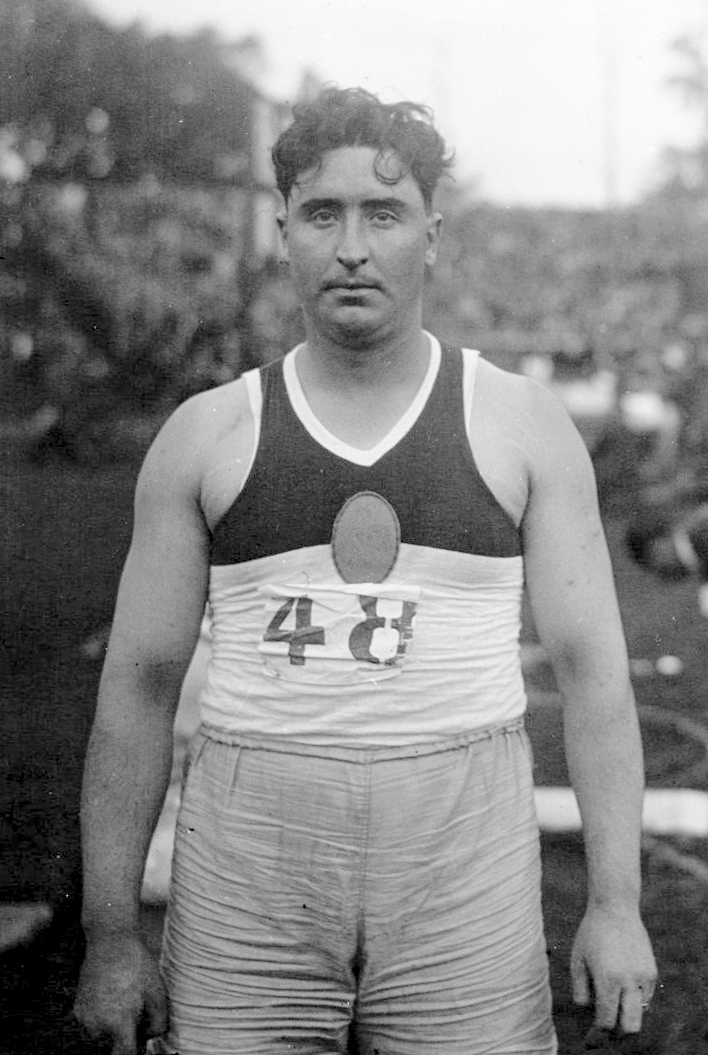
- Édouard Duhour in 1931

Personal information
- Born: 1 March 1905 Anglet, France
- Died: 21 November 1969 (aged 64)
- Height: 1.84 m (6 ft 0 in)
- Weight: 99 kg (218 lb)

Sport
- Sport: Athletics
- Event: Shot put
- Club: FC Grenoble, Grenoble

Achievements and titles
- Personal best: SP – 15.59 m (1934)

Édouard Duhour (1 March 1905 – 21 November 1969) was a French shot putter who competed at the 1928 Summer Olympics.

== Career ==
Duhour won the British AAA Championships title in the shot put event at the 1928 AAA Championships. Shortly afterwards he represented France at the 1928 Olympic Games in Amsterdam, Netherlands, where he finished in 11th place.

His younger brother Clément competed in the shot put and discus throw at the next Games.
