= Giulia Be =

Brazilian singer-songwriter (born 1999)

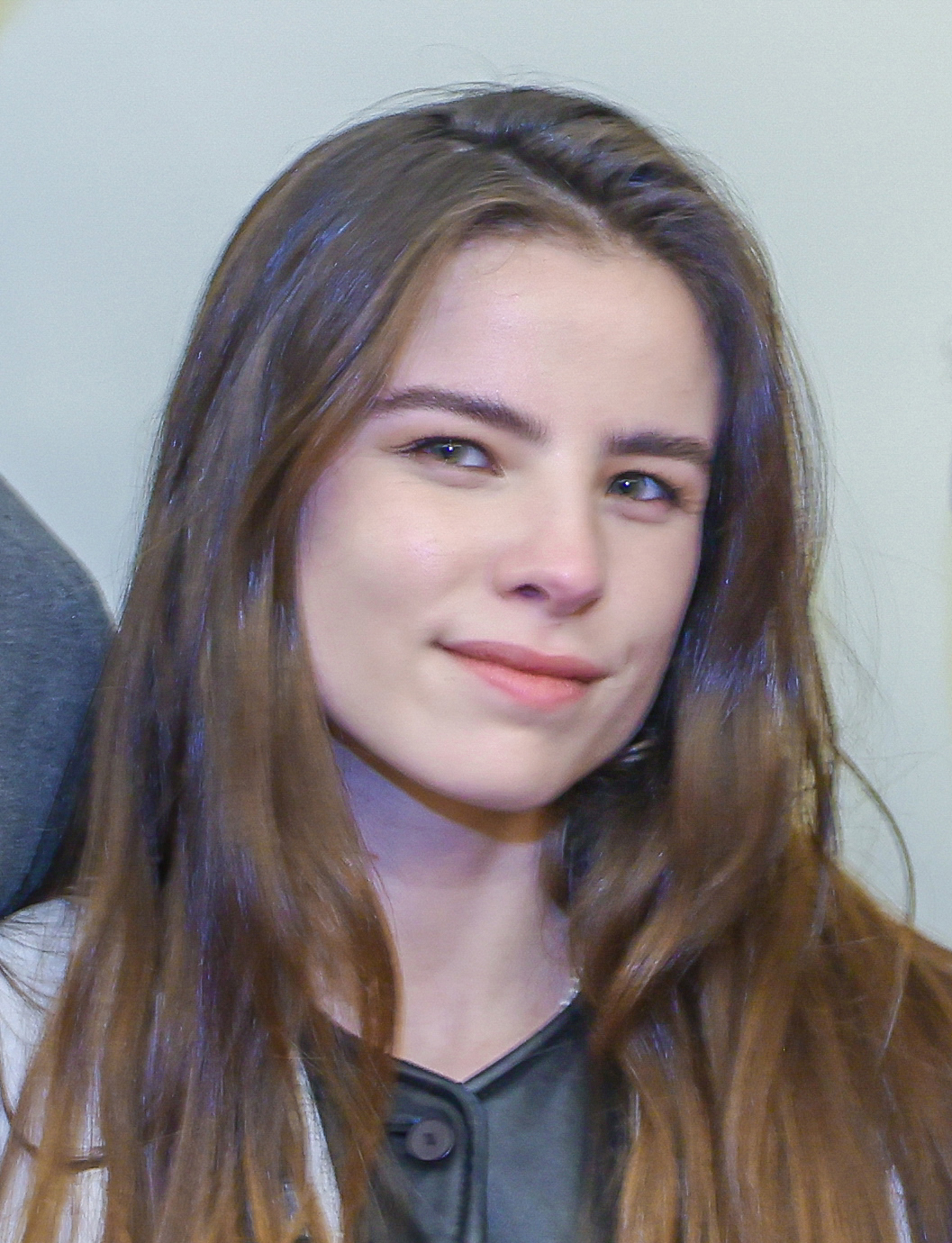
- Giulia Be in 2022
- Born: Giulia Bourguignon Marinho; 13 August 1999 (age 27); Rio de Janeiro, Brazil
- Occupations: Singer; songwriter; actress
- Years active: 2018–present
- Spouse: Conor Kennedy (m. 2026)
- Father: Paulo Marinho
- Musical career
- Genre: Pop
- Instrument: Vocals
- Labels: Warner Brasil; Sony Latin

Giulia Bourguignon Marinho (born 13 August 1999), known professionally as Giulia Be, is a Brazilian singer-songwriter and actress. She first gained recognition in 2018, when she released the song "With You" with Brazilian DJ Zerb. In 2019, her song "Too Bad", was the soundtrack of soap opera O Sétimo Guardião, in addition her song "Menina Solta" hit number #1 in Portugal.

== Early life ==
Giulia Bourguignon Marinho was born on August 13, 1999 in Rio de Janeiro, where she was raised. She is the daughter of Adriana Marinho, who is also her manager, and businessman Paulo Marinho. She is the sister of presenter and comedian André Marinho and Dany Marinho. Be wrote her first song at the age of eight, and learned the piano and guitar around this time.

During Rock in Rio 2017, she went with a friend to Maroon 5's dressing room to take a picture and ended up singing "She Will Be Loved" with the group members. After receiving praise from the band's guitarist Mickey Madden for her voice, she left school to pursue a music career.

== Career ==
In 2018, she signed with Warner Music and released her first single with Zerb titled "With You". In February 2019, Be released her solo debut single "Too Bad" in English. Shortly after its release, the song was featured in the soundtrack of soap opera O Sétimo Guardião, by Rede Globo, and also entered the top 50 viral of Spotify globally. In April of the same year, Be released "Chega", her second single and the first performed in Portuguese.

In August 2019, she released her third single "Menina Solta". In December 2019, the song was listed in the Top 10 by Spotify Brazil. The singer released a Spanish version of the song, "Chiquita Suelta", due to the song's success in some Latin countries. In June 2020, Be's album with the song "Menina Solta" was certified platinum in Brazil. It was included in the soundtrack of the soap opera Amor sem Igual, on RecordTV. Be performed at Rock in Rio 2019, alongside Projota and Vitão.

In March 2020, Be released "No Era Amor", her fourth single, and on 15 May her first EP, "Solta". The songs "If This Life Were A Movie" and "Relapse", also singles from the EP, had great repercussion. Be released "Unforgettable", her first partnership, with Luan Santana on October 9, 2020, also releasing the Spanish version of the song, "Inolvidable", on the same day. On December 18, Be released "I Love Me More" as the fifth single from the EP "Solta", along with the deluxe extended play version. In June 2021, she released the single "Lokko", chosen as the lead single for her new album. In June 2021, Be teamed up with David Carreira, Ludmilla and Preto Show, together they released the song "Vamos Com Tudo", official theme song for Portugal's selection for UEFA Euro 2020.

At the end of 2020, Spotify announced that "Menina Solta" by Be was the most listened-to Portuguese song in Portugal through Spotify, second in all international songs to "Blinding Lights" by The Weeknd.

In 2022, she starred in the Netflix film Beyond the Universe.

== Personal life ==
Be began dating Conor Kennedy, son of Robert F. Kennedy Jr., in February 2022, after they met in Los Angeles. On August 12, 2024, the couple announced their engagement via Instagram. They married in October 2026 and currently live together in Los Angeles.

== Filmography ==
Year	Title	Role	Notes
2022	Depois do Universo	Nina	

== Discography ==
=== Studio albums ===
List of studio albums, with selected chart positions
Title	Album details
Disco Voador	Released: 22 November 2022; Label: Warner; Formats: Digital download, streaming

=== Extended plays ===
List of extended plays
Title	Details	Peak chart positions	Certifications
Title	Details	POR	Certifications
Solta	Release: May 15, 2020; Label: Warner Music Brasil; Formats: Digital download, streaming	47	PMB: 2× Platinum

=== As lead artist ===
List of singles as lead artist, with selected chart positions and certifications, showing year released and album name
Title	Year	Peak chart positions				Certifications	Album
Title	Year	BRA	MEX	CHI	POR	Certifications	Album
"With You" (with Zerb)	2018	—	—	—	—		Non-album single
"Too Bad"	2019	—	—	—	—	PMB: 2× Platinum; AFP: Gold	Non-album single
"Chega"	2019	—	—	—	—	PMB: Gold	Non-album single
"Menina Solta" / "Chiquita Suelta"	2019	60	44	17	1	PMB: 3× Diamond; AFP: 5× Platinum	Solta
"Cobertor (Remix)" (with Projota & Vitão)	2019	—	—	—	—		Non-album single
"(Não) Era Amor"	2020	—	—	—	73	PMB: Diamond; AFP: Platinum	Solta
"Se Essa Vida Fosse Um Filme"	2020	—	—	—	36	PMB: Diamond; AFP: Platinum	Solta
"Te Sigo Somando" (with Simone & Simaria & Malía)	2020	59	—	—	—		Non-album single
"Inesquecível" / "Inolvidable" (with Luan Santana or solo)	2020	35	—	—	3	PMB: 2× Platinum; AFP: 4× Platinum	Non-album single
"Vamos Com Tudo" (with David Carreira & Ludmilla featuring Preto Show)	2021	—	—	—	9	AFP: Gold	Non-album single
"Lokko"	2021	—	—	—	—	PMB: Gold	Disco Voador
"Pessoa Certa Hora Errada"	2021	—	—	—	10	PMB: Platinum; AFP: 2× Platinum	Disco Voador
"Show"	2021	—	—	—	—		Disco Voador
"2 Palabras"	2022	—	—	—	—		Disco Voador
"FBI"	2022	—	—	—	—		Disco Voador
"O Velho e a Flor" (with Toquinho)	2022	—	—	—	—		Non-album single
"Desficava"	2022	—	—	—	—		Disco Voador
"Depois do Universo" / "Beyond the Universe"	2022	—	—	—	67		Non-album single
"—" denotes songs that did not make the charts or were not released in the country.

=== Promotional singles ===
Title	Year	Certifications	Album
"Recaída"	2020	PMB: Platinum	Solta
"Eu Me Amo Mais"	2020	PMB: Platinum; AFP: Gold	Solta

==== As guest artist ====
Title	Year	Album
"Hold On" (Dux featuring Giulia Be)	2019	Non-album single
"17" (Pink Sweat$ featuring Giulia Be)	2020	17 Duets
"Esta Navidad" (Mijares featuring Giulia Be)	2020	¡Feliz Navidad!

== Awards and nominations ==
Year	Award	Category	Nomination	Result	Ref.
2019	Meus Prêmios Nick	Revelação do Ano	Giulia Be	Nominated	
2019	Meus Prêmios Nick	Clipe de Estreia Nacional	"Menina Solta"	Nominated	
2019	WME Awards	Revelação	Giulia Be	Nominated	
2020	Meus Prêmios Nick	Hit Nacional Favorito	"Menina Solta"	Nominated	
2020	MTV Millennial Awards	Hino do Ano	"Menina Solta"	Nominated	
2020	Prêmio Multishow	Música Chiclete	"Menina Solta"	Nominated	
2020	Prêmio Multishow	Artista Experimente	Giulia Be	Nominated	
2020	WME Awards	Melhor Música Mainstream	"Menina Solta"	Nominated	
