= Ève Francis =

Actress

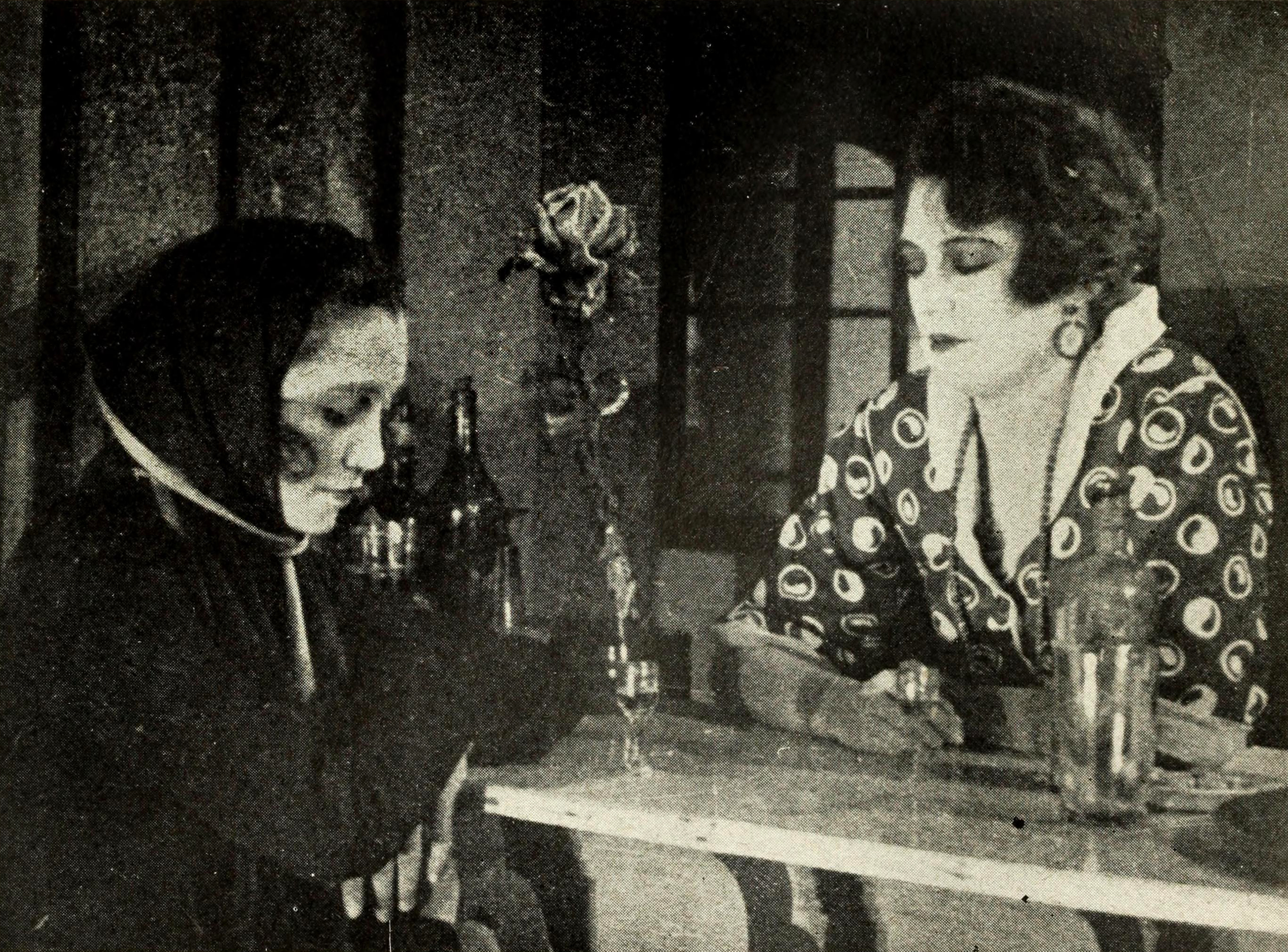
- Solange Sicard (left) with Ève Francis, in the 1921 film Fièvre directed by Louis Delluc.
- Born: Eva Louise François; 24 August 1886; Saint-Josse-ten-Noode, Belgium
- Died: 6 December 1980 (aged 94); Neuilly-sur-Seine, France
- Occupation: actress
- Years active: 1913–1975
- Spouse: Louis Delluc (m. 1918; died 1924)

Ève Francis (born Eva Louise François; 24 August 1886 – 6 December 1980) was a French actress and film-maker. She was born in Belgium but spent most of her career in France. She became closely associated with the writer Paul Claudel, and in 1918 she married the critic and film-maker Louis Delluc (six years before he died).

== Career ==
Ève Francis was born Eva Louise François at Saint-Josse-ten-Noode in Belgium. After completing her secondary education in Belgium, she embarked on a career as an actress and began working in the theatre in Paris in 1913. In 1914 she was introduced to the author Paul Claudel who chose her for the leading role in the first Paris production of his play L'Otage. Although only a few performances were given, the play was well received in literary and artistic circles and her reputation was established. Her long-lasting association with Claudel was at times personal as well as artistic, and in later years she described him as the most extraordinary person she had known and the dominant influence in her life. When Claudel wrote his Paroles au maréchal, addressed to Philippe Pétain after the collapse of France in 1940, Ève Francis gave a public recital of the poem in Vichy.

In 1913 Ève Francis met Louis Delluc, then a young novelist, poet and playwright, and a growing friendship led eventually to their marriage in January 1918. It was at her insistence that Delluc set aside his aversion to the film productions of the time and, in 1916, underwent a conversion to the possibilities of the new medium which would define the remainder of his career as a pioneering critic and film-maker. Her own career as a film actress developed fitfully from 1914 onwards, but in 1918 she made the first of several films with Germaine Dulac and became firmly linked with the avant-garde directors who contributed to the movement sometimes called impressionist cinema. When Louis Delluc turned to directing his own films in 1920, Ève Francis took the leading role in almost all of them, including La Femme de nulle part (1922) and L'Inondation (1924). She had one of her greatest successes in Marcel L'Herbier's El Dorado (1921) in which she played the ill-fated cabaret dancer Sibilla. Her style of acting has been described as balanced "between mannerism and pose; at its extreme it could be seen as an element of film architecture".

Although by the time of Delluc's early death in 1924, their personal relationship was becoming more distant, as his widow Ève Francis took charge of the substantial legacy of his writings and oversaw the posthumous publication of many of them. She greatly reduced the number of her own screen appearances, and during the 1930s she worked regularly as an assistant director with Marcel L'Herbier as well as giving lectures and writing film criticism. In the 1950s she gave support to the growing network of film societies in France ("ciné-clubs"), a project which Louis Delluc had first promulgated in 1920.

Ève Francis published two books of her own. Temps héroïques: théâtre, cinéma (Gand: Enseigne du chat qui pêche, 1949), with a preface by Paul Claudel, included her portrait of Louis Delluc. She recorded her recollections of Claudel himself in Un autre Claudel (Paris: Grasset, 1973).

After making two final screen appearances when in her late 80s, she died at Neuilly-sur-Seine on the outskirts of Paris on 6 December 1980 at the age of 94. She was buried in the cemetery at Bagneux, Hauts-de-Seine.

== Filmography ==
=== Actress ===
- 1914 : La Dame blonde, directed by Charles Maudru
- 1917 : Un homme passa, directed by Henry Roussell
- 1917 : Le Roi de la mer, directed by Jacques de Baroncelli
- 1918 : Âmes de fou, directed by Germaine Dulac
- 1918 : Frivolité, directed by Maurice Landais
- 1919 : Le Bonheur des autres, directed by Germaine Dulac
- 1919 : La Fête espagnole, directed by Germaine Dulac
- 1920 : Fumée noire, directed by Louis Delluc
- 1920 : Le Silence, directed by Louis Delluc
- 1921 : Fièvre, directed by Louis Delluc
- 1921 : Le Chemin d'Ernoa, directed by Louis Delluc
- 1921 : Eldorado, directed by Marcel L'Herbier
- 1921 : Prométhée banquier, directed by Marcel L'Herbier
- 1922 : La Femme de nulle part, directed by Louis Delluc
- 1924 : L'Inondation, directed by Louis Delluc
- 1924 : Âme d'artiste (Heart of an Actress), directed by Germaine Dulac
- 1926 : Antoinette Sabrier, directed by Germaine Dulac
- 1936 : Club de femmes (Women's Club), directed by Jacques Deval
- 1937 : Forfaiture (The Cheat), directed by Marcel L'Herbier
- 1938 : La Brigade sauvage (Savage Brigade), directed by Marcel L'Herbier
- 1939 : Yamilé sous les cèdres, directed by Charles d'Espinay
- 1939 : La Mode rêvée, short film directed by Marcel L'Herbier
- 1940 : La Comédie du bonheur, directed by Marcel L'Herbier
- 1975 : La Chair de l'orchidée, directed by Patrice Chéreau
- 1975 : Adieu poulet, directed by Pierre Granier-Deferre

=== Assistant director ===
- 1933 : L'Épervier, directed by Marcel L'Herbier
- 1934 : Le Bonheur, directed by Marcel L'Herbier
- 1934 : Le Scandale, directed by Marcel L'Herbier
- 1935 : La Route impériale, directed by Marcel L'Herbier
- 1935 : Veille d'armes, directed by Marcel L'Herbier
- 1935 : Les Hommes nouveaux, directed by Marcel L'Herbier
- 1936 : La Porte du large, directed by Marcel L'Herbier
- 1936 : Le Roman d'un spahi, directed by Michel Berheim
- 1937 : La Citadelle du silence, directed by Marcel L'Herbier
- 1937 : Forfaiture, directed by Marcel L'Herbier
- 1939 : La Brigade sauvage, directed by Marcel L'Herbier
