= Philippe Hériat =

French actor and writer (1898–1971)

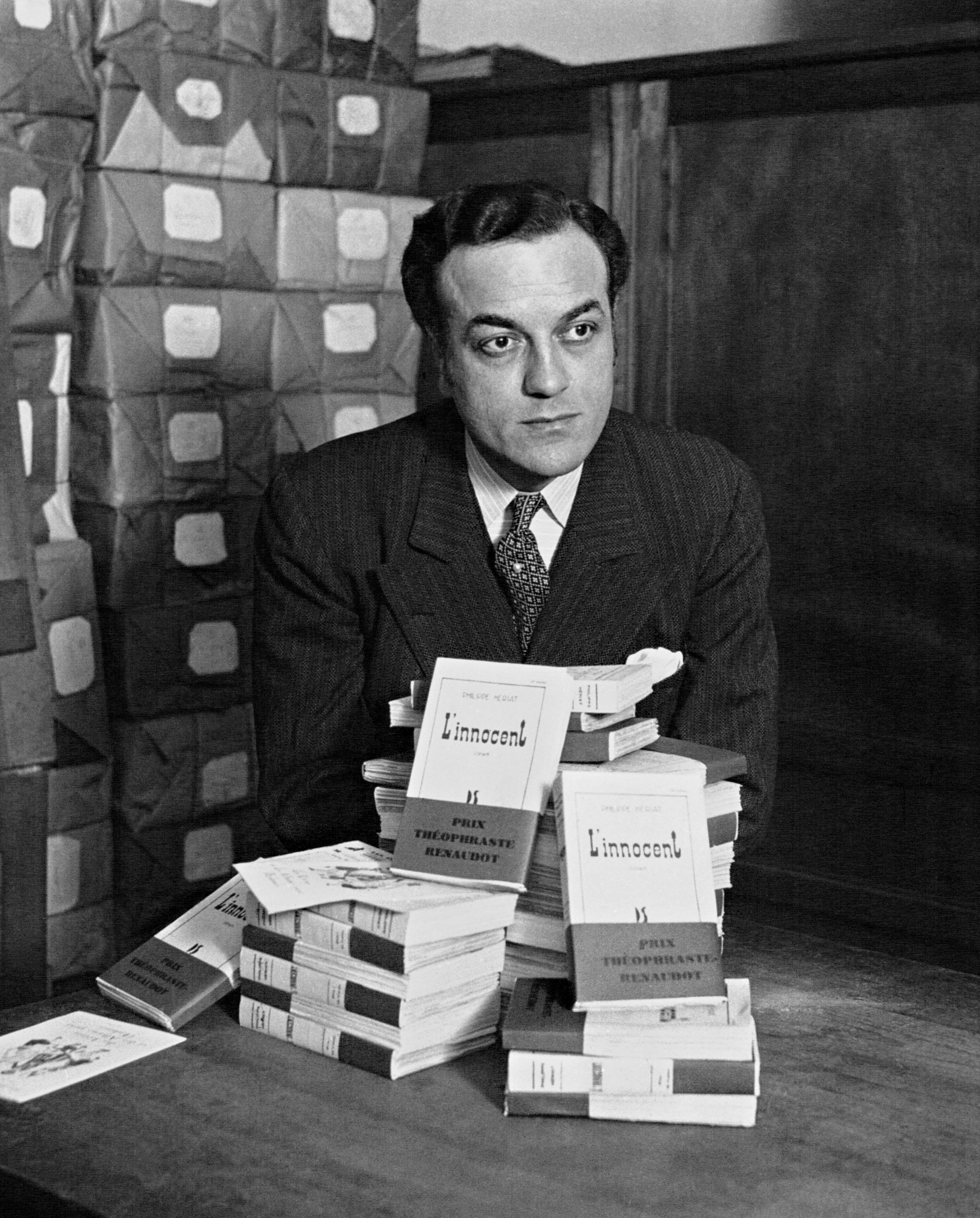
Philippe Hériat, 1931

Raymond Gérard Payelle (French: [filip eʁja]; 15 September 1898 – 10 October 1971), better known by his pseudonym Philippe Hériat, was a French novelist, playwright and actor. His most famous novels included Les Enfantes gâtés (The Spoiled Children), awarded the Prix Goncourt in 1939, and La Famille Boussardel, which won the Académie Goncourt in 1949.

== Biography ==
He was born in Paris and studied with film director René Clair and in 1920 made his debut in silent film. Over the next fifteen years, he appeared in secondary roles in another twenty-five films including the 1927 Abel Gance masterpiece, Napoleon. In 1949 Hériat collaborated with film director Jean Delannoy to write the screenplay for the film Le Secret de Mayerling.

Philippe Hériat won the 1931 Prix Renaudot for his book L'Innocent. In 1939 he won the Prix Goncourt for Les Enfants gâtés, and the 1947 Grand Prix du roman de l'Académie française for Famille Boussardel.

In 1949 he was made a member of the Académie Goncourt, a position he held until his death in 1971. Hériat is buried in Père Lachaise Cemetery in Paris.

== Bibliography ==
- L'Innocent (1931 – Prix Renaudot)
- La Titine. L'amour sur le banc (1932–1933)
- L'Araignée du matin (1933)
- La Main tendue (1933)
- Le Départ du Valdivia (1933)
- La Foire aux garçons (1934)
- Miroirs (1936)
- Les Enfants gâtés (1939) (Les Boussardel, 2 – Prix Goncourt)
- La Bruyère du Cap (1943)
- Famille Boussardel (1946) (Les Boussardel, 1 – Grand Prix du roman de l'Académie française)
- La Brimade inutile (1946)
- Les Grilles d'or (Les Boussardel, 3)
- Retour sur mes pas (1959)
- Le Temps d'aimer (1968) (Les Boussardel, 4)

== Selected filmography ==
=== As actor ===
- Le Carnaval des vérités (1920; dir. Marcel L'Herbier)
- L'Homme du large (1920; dir. Marcel L'Herbier)
- El Dorado (1921; dir. Marcel L'Herbier)
- L'Inondation (1924; dir. Louis Delluc)
- La Galerie des monstres (1924; dir. Jaque Catelain)
- Le Miracle des loups (1924; dir. Raymond Bernard)
- L'Inhumaine (1924; dir. Marcel L'Herbier)
- Feu Mathias Pascal (1925; dir. Marcel L'Herbier)
- Napoléon (1927; dir. Abel Gance)
- Mon cœur au ralenti (1928; dir. Marco de Gastyne)
- Napoleon auf St. Helena (1929; dir. Lupu Pick)
- Détresse (1929; dir. Jean Durand)
- La Merveilleuse Vie de Jeanne d'Arc (1929; dir. Marco de Gastyne)
- Le Sexe faible (1933; dir. Robert Siodmak)
- Rothchild (1934; dir. Marco de Gastyne)
- Lucrèce Borgia (1935; dir. Abel Gance)
- Divine (1935; dir. Max Ophüls)

=== As writer ===
- Le Secret de Mayerling (1949; dir. Jean Delannoy) (dialogue)
