= La Galerie des monstres =

1924 film by Jaque Catelain

- Press advertisement
- Directed by: Jaque Catelain
- Written by: Jaque Catelain
- Produced by: Cinégraphic; Marcel L'Herbier
- Starring: Jaque Catelain; Lois Moran; Jean Murat
- Cinematography: Georges Specht
- Distributed by: Les Grandes Productions Cinématographiques
- Release dates: 26 September 1924 (France & Spain)
- Running time: 93 minutes
- Country: France
- Language: Silent (French intertitles)

La Galerie des monstres ("the gallery of monsters") is a 1924 French drama film directed by Jaque Catelain, set against the background of a circus in Spain. It was produced by Cinégraphic, the production company of Marcel L'Herbier.

== Plot ==
In a town in Spanish Castile, a young man, reluctantly living with a roaming band of gypsies, and a local orphan girl want to marry, but when the girl's grandfather forbids their plan, they decide to run away together. A few years later, they have become Riquett's, a clown, and Ralda, a dancer, in a travelling circus which arrives in Toledo. Despite being still in love and having a young child together, the couple's situation is made unhappy by continual attempts to break them apart: by Sveti, a false friend in love with Ralda, by Flossie, an American dancer who constantly flirts with Riquett's, and especially by Buffalo, the tyrannical director of the circus, who lusts after Ralda. Others in the troupe include a giantess, a dwarf, a mermaid, and a bearded lady.

When Buffalo's attempts to seduce Ralda are rejected, he provokes a lion and releases it from its cage on to the stage where Ralda is dancing. She is badly mauled, but Buffalo claims it was just a small accident and forces Riquett's to continue with his act. Madame Violette, the downtrodden wife of Buffalo, has witnessed the true story and secretly helps the couple to escape with their child. Once they are safe, she denounces her husband.

== Cast ==
- Jaque Catelain as Riquett's
- Lois Moran as Ralda / Ofélia
- Claire Prélia as Mme Violette
- Jean Murat as Sveti
- Yvonneck as Buffalo
- Florence Martin as Flossie
- Lili Samuel as Pirouette
- Jean-Paul Le Tarare as Stryx
- Philippe Hériat as the giantess
- Kiki de Montparnasse as the bayadère
- Marcel Rosar as the lion tamer

== Production ==
The film was financed by Marcel L'Herbier's production company Cinégraphic and it was the second to be directed by the actor Jaque Catelain, following the relative success of his previous film Le Marchand de plaisirs. In December 1923 L'Herbier offered the project to Catelain, provided that within a fortnight he could produce a scenario which should be set in a circus or menagerie.

In addition to Catelain in the leading role, the cast included the film début of the American dancer and actress Lois Moran who was only 15 at the time. Jean Murat also appeared in one of his earliest film roles, and Kiki de Montparnasse made a short appearance as a circus dancer. Alberto Cavalcanti was the assistant director as well as contributing to the set designs along with Djo Bourgeois. In his supervisory role for the production, Marcel L'Herbier was credited for "direction artistique".

Filming then began in February 1924 with location shooting in Spain, in Toledo, Pedraza and Segovia, where much of the landscape was covered in snow. The remainder of filming took place at Studios Éclair in Épinay. The large number of characters and extras (plus circus animals) made the process a difficult one for Catelain as actor/director, and despite the film's warm reception it contributed to his decision to limit his role to acting in the future.

== Reception ==
The film received a preview screening for the "Amis du Cinéma" at the Artistic-Cinéma in Paris on 18 May 1924. It was then released simultaneously in France and Spain in September that year, with a positive reception.

For the central sequences of Riquett's frenetic dance on stage and the lion's attack, the film used montages of rapid editing, sometimes almost subliminal, to create a complex impression of parallel action or thought (a technique which was also employed in other 'avant-garde' French films of the period such as La Roue, Cœur fidèle, and L'Inhumaine). These devices were variously received in reviews, either as over-elaborate and distracting or as dynamic and essential. The film was also released in Japan in 1925 and made an impact there: when the film magazine Kinema junpô asked its readers to vote on the best films of the year, La Galerie des monstres achieved first place.

A 4K restoration of La Galerie des monstres from the original negative was carried out by the Centre national du cinéma et de l'image animée (CNC) in 2019.
