= Marcelle Pradot =

French actress (1901–1982)

- Born: Marcelle Marie Claire Pénicaud; 27 July 1901; Montmorency, Val-d'Oise, France
- Died: 24 June 1982 (aged 80); Neuilly-sur-Seine, France
- Occupation: Actress
- Years active: 1919–1930
- Spouse: Marcel L'Herbier (1923–1979)

Marcelle Pradot (born Marcelle Marie Claire Pénicaud or Pénicaut; 27 July 1901 – 24 June 1982) was a French actress who worked principally in silent films. She was born at Montmorency, Val-d'Oise, near Paris. At the age of 18 while she was taking classes in dancing and singing in Paris, she was asked by Marcel L'Herbier to appear in his film Le Bercail (1919). She went on to appear in a further eight of L'Herbier's silent films, and then in his first sound film L'Enfant de l'amour (1930) with which she ended her acting career. She was noted as an aristocratic beauty, and she was described by the critic Louis Delluc as "the Infanta of French cinema".

Marcelle Pradot and Marcel L'Herbier were married in late 1923, and their daughter Marie-Ange was born in the following year. Marcelle Pradot died in Neuilly-sur-Seine in 1982, two and a half years after L'Herbier.

== Filmography ==
- 1919 : Le Bercail (dir. Marcel L'Herbier)
- 1920 : Le Carnaval des vérités, (dir. Marcel L'Herbier)
- 1920 : L'Homme du large, (dir. Marcel L'Herbier)
- 1921 : Prométhée... Banquier, (dir. Marcel L'Herbier)
- 1921 : El Dorado, (dir. Marcel L'Herbier)
- 1922 : Don Juan et Faust, (dir. Marcel L'Herbier)
- 1923 : Le Marchand des plaisirs, (dir. Jaque Catelain)
- 1924 : L'Inhumaine, (dir. Marcel L'Herbier)
- 1925 : Feu Mathias Pascal, (dir. Marcel L'Herbier)
- 1928 : L'Argent, (dir. Marcel l'Herbier)
- 1930 : L'Enfant de l'amour, (dir. Marcel l'Herbier)
