= La Route impériale =

- Theatrical release poster
- Directed by: Marcel L'Herbier
- Written by: Marcel L'Herbier; Serge Véber
- Based on: the play La Maison cernée by Pierre Frondaie
- Produced by: Pierre O'Connell
- Starring: Kate de Nagy; Pierre Richard-Willm; Jaque Catelain
- Cinematography: Michel Kelber; Louis Née
- Music by: Marius-François Gaillard
- Production companies: Films Union; La Société des Films Sirius
- Distributed by: Compagnie Française de Distribution Cinématographique (CFDC)
- Release date: September 1935
- Running time: 95 minutes
- Country: France
- Language: French

La Route impériale ("the imperial road") is a 1935 French film directed by Marcel L'Herbier. It combines a romantic drama with a military adventure story, set against the contemporary background of British operations against a rebellion in the kingdom of Iraq.

== Plot ==
In the Kingdom of Iraq in 1935, British troops are stationed to protect the convoy route to India from rebel incursions. After spending three years in under-cover activities in the region, Lieutenant Brent, a British officer, has fallen under suspicion of treacherous dealings with the enemy but has been cleared by a military tribunal. He joins the garrison in Iraq commanded by Colonel Stark, but is embarrassed to meet there his former lover, Joyce, who is now the colonel's wife. During an operation to recapture the rebel stronghold of Ksour, Brent is inadvertently compromised with Joyce, and when he and her brother Dan attempt to protect her reputation, Brent becomes suspected of treason by the cynical Major Hudson. Brent escapes during a rebel attack, and using his experience to infiltrate the enemy fortress he disables its armaments and facilitates its capture.

== Cast ==
- Kate de Nagy, as Joyce Stark
- Pierre Richard-Willm, as James Brent
- Jaque Catelain as Dan Grant
- Aimé Clariond, as Colonel Stark
- Pierre Renoir, as Major Hudson
- Kissa Kouprine, as Alia
- Jean Forest, as Lieutenant Drake

== Production ==
The subject of the film was proposed to Marcel L'Herbier by the producer Pierre O'Connell, of Film Union. It came as part of a wave of enthusiasm for colonial adventures on film, such as The Lives of a Bengal Lancer and La Bandera. The play from which the film was adapted was La Maison cernée by Pierre Frondaie, written in 1919 and staged in Paris soon afterwards; it was a romantic melodrama set in Palestine during World War I. L'Herbier revised the plot, renamed the characters, and relocated the story to Iraq in 1935, where the recently independent kingdom was still under British influence, with British troops stationed in the country.

Filming took place in May and June 1935, at the Billancourt studios in France and in Algeria at Bou Saâda and Boghari for exterior scenes. At Bordj El Kiffan, on the outskirts of Algiers, they used the remains of a film set built for Julien Duvivier's biblical film Golgotha; it now served to represent the rebel fortress of Ksour and was blown up in the final scenes of the film.

L'Herbier's assistant director was Ève Francis who had previously worked on many films with him both as actress and assistant. The music for the film was composed by Marius-François Gaillard who had written the orchestral score for L'Herbier's silent film El Dorado. Another regular collaborator with the director was the costume designer Jacques Manuel, who created several elegant gowns to be worn by the leading actress Kate de Nagy (introducing an element of luxury and glamour in the stark setting of an army garrison in the desert).

== Reception ==
The film was released in September 1935 and had some commercial success. It was shown in various countries across Europe and in Quebec. Critical responses were generally favourable, but there was some adverse comment among French reviewers that it should not be the business of the French to make films which glorified the British Empire. It was also noted that the film held echoes of another contemporary conflict in the developing Abyssinia crisis and its implications for British control of the Suez Canal zone.

The film's later survival was threatened when the original negative was burned by the German occupying forces in 1940. After the war, a surviving interpositive copy was discovered, from which further prints could be made. A digital restoration of the film was made in 2014.
