= Michel Simon =

Swiss actor (1895-1975)

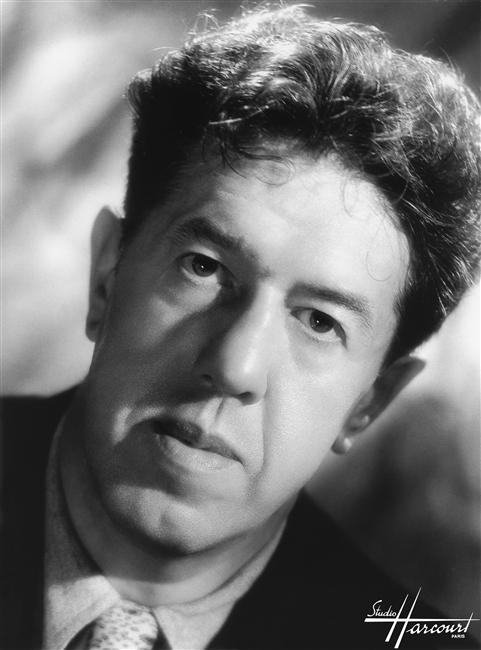
- Simon in 1943
- Born: François Joseph Simon; 9 April 1895; Geneva, Switzerland
- Died: 30 May 1975 (aged 80); Bry-sur-Marne, France
- Occupation: Actor
- Years active: 1924–1975 (film)
- Children: François Simon

Michel Simon (French: [miʃɛl simɔ̃]; 9 April 1895 – 30 May 1975) was a Swiss actor of German origin active primarily in France. He appeared in many notable French films, including La Chienne (1931), Boudu Saved from Drowning (1932), L'Atalante (1934), Port of Shadows (1938), The Head (1959), and The Train (1964).

== Early life and education ==
Simon was born on 9 April 1895 in Geneva, Switzerland, to Joseph Simon, a pork butcher from Villingen (Baden), and Véronique Burnat. His parents were of German origin. He left his family and moved to Paris, where he first lived at the Hotel Renaissance, Saint-Martin Street, then in Montmartre. He worked many different jobs to survive, such as giving boxing lessons and peddling smuggled lighters.

== Career ==
His career began modestly in 1912, working as a magician, clown, acrobat, and stooge in a dancers' show called "Ribert's and Simon's", in the Montreuil-sous-Bois Casino.

Conscripted into the Swiss Army in 1914, he spent time in the stockade. He also contracted tuberculosis.

In 1915, while on leave, he saw Georges Pitoëff's early work in the French language, at the Theatre de la Comédie of Geneva, acting in Hedda Gabler, and was inspired to become an actor himself. In 1920 he made his first brief appearance on stage, with Pitoëff's company, speaking three lines in Shakespeare's Measure for Measure. He also worked at this time as the company's photographer. One of his early successes was a supporting role in George Bernard Shaw's Androcles and the Lion. In 1922, Pitoëff's company moved to Paris at the Comédie des Champs-Élysées.

Simon quit the company in 1923 to become a light comedy actor in plays by Tristan Bernard, Marcel Achard and Yves Mirande. Achard presented him to Charles Dullin, in whose company he acted in Je ne vous aime pas with Valentine Tessier.

=== Theatrical success and his transition to film ===
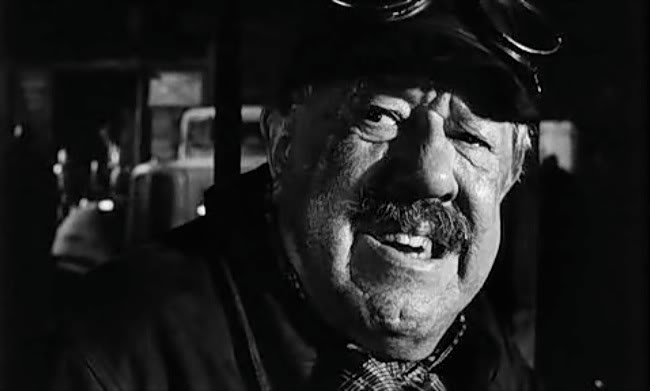
Simon in the trailer for The Train (1964)

Louis Jouvet, who had replaced Pitoëff, hired Simon at the Comédie des Champs-Élysées. Simon then gave a successful performance in Archard's Jean de la Lune as Cloclo.

In the 1930s, Simon's theatrical career rose to prominence with performances in works by Shakespeare, Bernard Shaw, Pirandello, Oscar Wilde, Bourdet, and Henri Bernstein. However, it was film that brought him stardom and international recognition.

Simon's first film appearance was in the 1925 silent film, Feu Mathias Pascal, adapted from a Pirandello novel and directed by Marcel L'Herbier. In the same year, he starred in the modestly budgeted The Vocation of André Carel, directed by Jean Choux. As the silent era ended, he appeared in Carl Theodor Dreyer's The Passion of Joan of Arc (1928). Simon's film career was boosted with the advent of talking pictures. People remarked that his elocution and gravelly voice were as original as his appearance. These features were exploited by notable 1930s French directors, including Jean Renoir (La Chienne, Boudu Saved From Drowning), Jean Vigo (L'Atalante) and Marcel Carné (Port of Shadows, Bizarre, Bizarre).

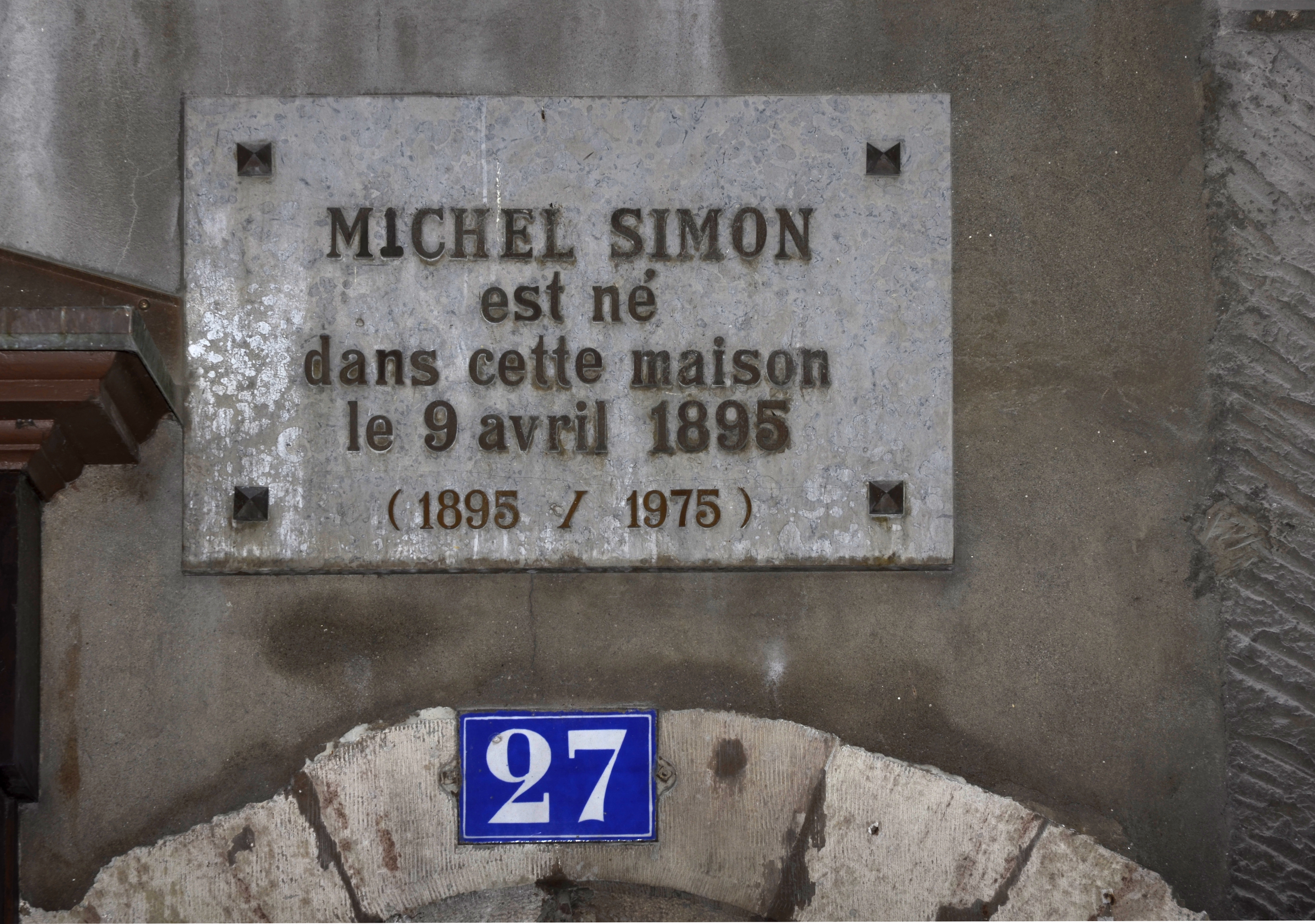
Plaque in memory of Michel Simon, 27 Grand Rue, Geneva

He appeared in 55 plays from 1920 to 1965, and 101 from 1965 to 1975. He reined in his activities in the 1950s, following an accident involving a makeup dye that left part of his face and body paralysed.

== Recognition ==
In 1967, he won the Silver Bear for Best Actor at the 17th Berlin International Film Festival for his role in The Two of Us.

Charlie Chaplin said he was "the greatest actor in the world".

== Personal life ==
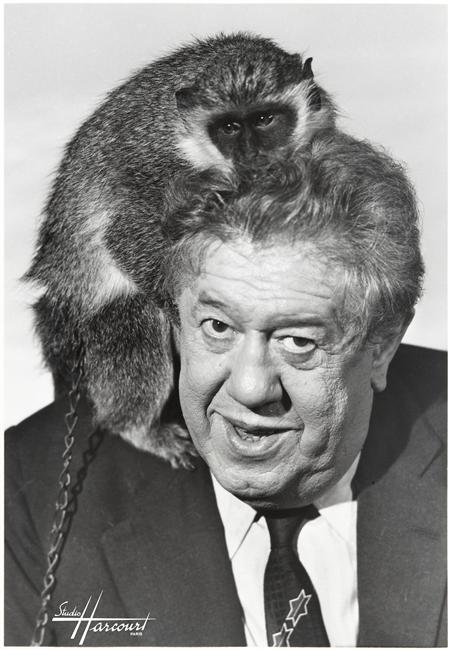
Simon with a pet monkey in 1948

Simon would say that he preferred living with animals than living with humans. He lived for a long time in a bohemian house in Noisy-le-Grand, near Paris. He built a series of exterior wire tunnels that linked the various floors and allowed his pet monkeys freedom to roam around. The house was filled with bric-a-brac, including his large collection of erotic photographs and films.

== Death and legacy ==
Simon died aged 80 on 30 May 1975 in Bry-sur-Marne from a pulmonary embolism and is buried in the Grand-Lancy Cemetery of Geneva, next to his parents.

His personal collections and bric-a-brac were dispersed after his death.

=== Michel Simon Prize ===
The Michel Simon Prize (Prix Michel-Simon) was created in 1989 by Alain Losi, director of the Acteurs à l'Ecran ("Actors on Screen") festival held in Saint-Denis. Losi was succeeded by Armand Badëyan as director of the festival, but the last edition was held in 2000, but the prize continued to be awarded. A permanent jury, composed of five members from the profession, was set up. The Michel Simon Prize Forums were/are three weekends per year, featuring screenings and meetings with nominated young actors and directors. Two prizes of equal value are awarded each year to a promising young actor and actress who have appeared in a French feature film in the previous year.

Winners of the prize include:

- 1989: Nathalie Richard, for her performance in Gang of Four (1988), directed by Jacques Rivette
- 1992: Elsa Zylberstein , for Van Gogh, by Maurice Pialat
- 1997: Samir Guesmi, for Malik le maudit, directed by Youcef Hamidi
- 2003: Dina Droukarova for Since Otar Left, directed by Julie Bertuccelli; and Thiago Teles for his debut performance in Tiresia, directed by Bertrand Bonello

== Selected filmography ==
- La galerie des monstres (1924)
- The Vocation of André Carel (1925), Gaston Lebeau
- Feu Mathias Pascal (1926, directed by Marcel L'Herbier), Jérôme Pomino
- L'inconnue des six jours (1926), Le valet de chambre
- The Loves of Casanova (1927), Sbire
- The Passion of Joan of Arc (1928, directed by Carl Theodor Dreyer), Jean Lemaître
- Tire au flanc (1928), Joseph Turlot
- Pivoine (1929)
- L'enfant de l'amour (1930), Lorédan
- Jean de la Lune (1931), Clothaire dit Clo-Clo
- On purge bébé (1931, directed by Jean Renoir), Chouilloux
- La Chienne (1931, directed by Jean Renoir), Maurice Legrand
- Baleydier (1932), Baleydier
- Boudu Saved from Drowning (1932, directed by Jean Renoir), Priape Boudu
- High and Low (1933, directed by G. W. Pabst), Maximilian Podeletz
- Léopold le bien-aimé (1934), M. Ponce
- Miquette (1934), Monchablon
- Lake of Ladies (1934), Oscar Lyssenhop
- L'Atalante (1934, directed by Jean Vigo), Old Jules
- Le Bonheur (1934, directed by Marcel L'Herbier), Noël Malpiaz
- The Squadron's Baby (1935), Perrot-Joly
- Adémaï in the Middle Ages (1935), Lord Pickwickdam
- Lovers and Thieves (1935), Doizeau
- Under Western Eyes (1936), Lespara
- Moutonnet (1936), Frècheville
- The Brighton Twins (1936), Labrosse
- Girls of Paris (1936), Baron de Beaupoil and his brother
- Death on the Run (1936), Achille Baluchet
- Let's Make a Dream (1936), Un invité (prologue)
- Le choc en retour (1937), Laverdac
- Boulot the Aviator (1937), Baron Gobèche
- The Silent Battle (1937), Sauvin
- Bizarre, Bizarre (1937, directed by Marcel Carné), Irwin Molyneux
- The Kiss of Fire (1937), Michel
- Mirages (1938), Michel
- Boys' School (1938, directed by Christian-Jaque), Lemel
- Port of Shadows (1939, directed by Marcel Carné), Zabel
- The New Rich (1938), Martinet
- Beautiful Star (1938), Léon
- The Gutter (1938), Le comte Edouard de Bourgogne
- Mother Love (1938), Michel Quercy
- Le règne de l'esprit malin (1938), Luc
- Noix de coco (1939), Josserand
- Deputy Eusèbe (1939), Eusèbe Bonbonneau
- Behind the Facade (1939), Picking
- The End of the Day (1939), Cabrisssade
- The Last Turning (1939, based on the novel The Postman Always Rings Twice), Nick Marino
- Fric-Frac (1939, directed by Claude Autant-Lara & Maurice Lehmann), Jo
- Extenuating Circumstances (1939), M. Gaetan Le Sentencier, 'La Sentence'
- Love Cavalcade (1939), Diogenes, Monseigneur de Beaupré, and Lacouret
- Musicians of the Sky (1940), Captain Simon
- Paris-New York (1940), Commissioner Boucheron
- La Comédie du bonheur (1940, directed by Marcel L'Herbier), François Jourdain/Giambattista Giordano (Italian version, Ecco la felicità)
- Tosca (1941, directed by Carl Koch), Baron Scarpia
- The King's Jester (1941), Rigoletto
- Girl of the Golden West (1942), Butler / Carras
- Shop Girls of Paris (1943), Baudu
- Vautrin (1943), Jacques Collin dit Vautrin
- A Friend Will Come Tonight (1946), Michel Lemaret
- Panic (Panique) (1946, directed by Julien Duvivier), Monsieur Hire
- The Crowned Fish Tavern (1947), Capitaine Palmer
- Not Guilty (1947), Le docteur Michel Ancelin
- The Lovers of Pont Saint Jean (1947), Alcide Garonne
- La carcasse et le tord-cou (1948), Joseph Ferdinand Anselme Midot, dit 'Le tord-cou'
- Fabiola (1949), Senator Fabius Severus
- Beauty and the Devil (1950, directed by René Clair), Mephistopheles / Old Professor Henri Faust
- Poison (1951, directed by Sacha Guitry), Paul-Louis Victor Braconnier
- Monsieur Taxi (1952), Pierre Verger (Monsieur Taxi)
- Full House (1952), Le commissaire Jules Maigret ("Le témoignage d'un enfant de choeur" segment)
- The Secret of the Mountain Lake (1952), Bürgermeister (French version)
- The Girl with the Whip (1952), Le tuteur d'Angelina
- The Temptress (1952), Cidoni
- Crimson Curtain (1952), Bertal / Banquo
- The Road to Damascus (1952), Caïphe
- The Merchant of Venice (1953), Shylock
- The Virtuous Scoundrel (1953), Albert and Alain Ménard-Lacoste
- Women of Paris (1953), Professor Charles Buisson
- Saadia (1953), Bou Rezza
- L'Étrange Désir de monsieur Bard (1954), Auguste Bard
- A Slice of Life (1954), Padre Silvio (segment "Casa d'altri")
- Hungarian Rhapsody (1954), General von Sayn-Wittgenstein
- At the Order of the Czar (1954), Prince de Sayn-Wittgenstein
- The Impossible Mr. Pipelet (1955, directed by André Hunebelle), Maurice Martin
- Memories of a Cop (1956), Le commissaire principal Henri Dominique
- La joyeuse prison (1956), Benoit - le surveillant-chef
- Three Make a Pair (1957), Commissaire Bernard
- A Certain Monsieur Jo (1958), Joseph 'Jo' Guardini
- It Happened in Broad Daylight (1959, directed by Ladislao Vajda), Jacquier
- The Head (1959, directed by Victor Trivas), Professor Abel
- Austerlitz (1960), Alboise
- Pete the Tender (1960, directed by François Villiers), Pierrot
- Candide ou l'optimisme au XXe siècle (1960, an adaptation of Voltaire's Candide), Colonel Nanar
- Le Bateau d'Émile (1961) directed by Denys de la Patelliére), Charles-Edmond Larmentiel
- The Devil and the Ten Commandments (1962, directed by Julien Duvivier), Jérôme Chambard ("Dieu en vain ne jureras" and "Les Dimanches tu garderas" segments)
- Marco Polo (1962)
- The Train (1964, directed by John Frankenheimer), Papa Boule
- Cyrano and d'Artagnan (1964), Duc de Mauvières
- Deux heures à tuer (1966), L'employé de la consigne
- The Two of Us (1967, directed by Claude Berri), Pépé Dupont
- The Marriage Came Tumbling Down (1968), Le vieux Jéricho
- Contestazione generale (1970), Cavazza
- La maison (1970), Louis Compiegne
- Blanche (1971, directed by Walerian Borowczyk), Le châtelain
- The Most Wonderful Evening of My Life (1972, directed by Ettore Scola), Attorney Zorn
- Le boucher, la star et l'orpheline (1975), L'érotologue
- The Red Ibis (1975, directed by Jean-Pierre Mocky)
