= The Late Matthias Pascal =

The Late Matthias Pascal may refer to:

- Il fu Mattia Pascal, a novel by Luigi Pirandello.
- Feu Mathias Pascal, a 1925 French film adaptation by Marcel L'Herbier.
