= Fantastic Night (1942 film) =

La Nuit fantastique
- Directed by: Marcel L'Herbier
- Written by: Louis Chavance; Maurice Henry
- Produced by: Union Technique Cinématographique; Henri Mallet, Guillaume Radot, Vincent Bréchignac
- Starring: Micheline Presle; Fernand Gravey
- Cinematography: Pierre Montazel
- Edited by: Émilienne Nelissen; Suzanne Catelain
- Music by: Maurice Thiriet
- Production company: Pathé Cinéma
- Release date: 10 July 1942
- Running time: 103 minutes
- Country: France
- Language: French

La Nuit fantastique (The Fantastic Night) is a 1942 French fantasy film directed by Marcel L'Herbier. It is regarded as one of the most successful films made in France during the German occupation.

== Plot ==
Denis, a poor student in philosophy, works as a night porter in the Paris market of Les Halles in order to pay for his studies. Constantly weary, he falls asleep and dreams of a beautiful girl in white, Irène, with whom he falls in love. An adventure follows in which he tries to save the girl from being married off for her money. When he awakes, he discovers Irène alive and real.

== Cast ==
- Fernand Gravey, as Denis
- Micheline Presle, as Irène, a 'dream woman.'
- Saturnin Fabre, as Thalès
- Jean Parédès, as Cadet
- Michel Vitold, as Boris
- Bernard Blier, as Lucien
- Marcel Lévesque, as Doctor Le Tellier
- Charles Granval, as Adalbert, the blind man

== Production ==
As L'Herbier was finishing Histoire de rire, his first film made during the Occupation, he was presented with a scenario written by Louis Chavance and Maurice Henry which immediately suggested to him the possibility of creating a film in the spirit of some of his earlier silent films, on a theme that he characterised as a "realistic fairy-tale". (At the time he seemed to be thinking of a tradition begun by the films of Georges Méliès, though in his later memoirs he made a link rather with a style derived from the Lumière brothers, in which realistic images were here pushed towards a kind of surrealism.) It gave him the opportunity to return to the kinds of experiment with visual style, and now also with sound effects, which had marked silent films such as L'Inhumaine and Feu Mathias Pascal.

In an interview in 1967 L'Herbier reflected further on the starting points for the film, including the Melancholia by Dürer, a picture in which realistic elements are arranged and lit strangely, creating the effect of a dreamy meditation. He also noted that the scenario was inspired by an idea of Pascal: since we spend half our life sleeping, it may be that the other half, when we think we are awake, is in fact another sleep, a little different from the first, and from which we awake when we think we are sleeping.

The dialogue was written by Henri Jeanson, uncredited because he was at the time forbidden to work for the press or the cinema following his imprisonment for pacifist writings and non-cooperation with the Vichy government. The film's sets were designed by René Moulaert and Marcel Magniez.

Filming began in December 1941 at the Joinville Studios in Paris. L'Herbier described the working conditions as being the worst he had known because of the extreme cold, sometimes as low as -15 °C, but at the same time he found it an exhilarating experience because he felt a creative freedom that he not known for many years.

== Reception ==
La Nuit fantastique was first shown in Paris in July 1942, in a version running for about 90 minutes because of nearly 15 minutes of cuts made by the distributor. L'Herbier blamed this for the film's lack of success with the public during 1942 and 1943. It was only in 1944 that a complete version was released. This prompted André Bazin to write a substantial review article in which he asserted the film's significance in establishing a new spirit of independence to French film-making and in rehabilitating the spirit of Méliès and "the marvelous". Another critic who saw the film on its release recalled it later with enthusiasm, saying that it had restored a sense of innovation to the Occupation cinema.

In 1943 a Grand Prix du Film d'Art was created and it was awarded jointly to La Nuit fantastique (along with Les Visiteurs du soir) for the 1941/42 season. Micheline Presle was also awarded a Grand Prix de la Critique.
