= Jean George Auriol =

French film critic and screenwriter (born 1907)

- Born: Jean-Georges Huyot; January 8, 1907; Paris, France
- Died: April 2, 1950 (aged 43); Chartres, France
- Other name: Jean-Georges Auriol
- Occupation: Writer
- Years active: 1926–1950 (film)

Jean George Auriol (January 8, 1907 – April 2, 1950) was a French film critic and screenwriter. He was the founder of the film magazine La Revue du cinéma.

== Biography ==
Jean George Auriol (born Jean-Georges Huyot; his name is sometimes written as Jean-Georges Auriol) was the son of the French poet, artist, and type-designer George Auriol. In December 1928 Auriol published the first issue of a magazine called Du cinéma which, after being adopted by the publisher Gallimard, became La Revue du cinéma. It ran for a total of 29 issues until December 1931, and it established a reputation for intellectual seriousness and the quality of its contributors, who included Jacques Brunius, Louis Chavance, and Jean-Paul Le Chanois. Auriol established a structure for each issue (a major article, a selection of studies, film reviews and news items) which became a model for other journals.

In 1946 Auriol launched a second series of La Revue du cinéma, still with Gallimard, and it continued for a run of 19 issues until autumn 1949. Among the writers who featured in it at this period were Éric Rohmer, Jacques Doniol-Valcroze, Pierre Kast, and André Bazin. After the closure of the journal, and after the death of Auriol, members of this group were among the founders of Cahiers du cinéma, of which the initial design and content were modelled on the earlier journal. The first issue of Cahiers was dedicated to Auriol.

Between 1930 and 1950, Auriol wrote a large number of articles for other film journals. He also earned his living as a screenwriter, on several occasions for Marcel L'Herbier.

Auriol died in April 1950, following a road accident.

== Selected filmography (screenwriter) ==
- L'Épervier (1933)
- Les Filles de la concierge (The Concierge's Daughters) (1934)
- Lac aux dames (Lake of Ladies) (1934)
- Divine (1935)
- Forfaiture (The Cheat) (1937)
- Adrienne Lecouvreur (1938)
- Terre de feu (1939)
- Angelica (1939)
- Napoli che non muore (Naples Will Never Die) (1939)
- L'Honorable Catherine (The Honourable Catherine) (1943)
- L'Homme sans nom (The Man Without a Name) (1943)
- Fabiola (1949)
