= La Comédie du bonheur =

La Comédie du bonheur Ecco la felicità!
- Poster for the French version of the film, released in 1942
- Directed by: Marcel L'Herbier
- Written by: André Cerf; Marcel L'Herbier; Jean Cocteau (additional dialogue); Gino Valori (Italian adaptation)
- Based on: Samoe glavnoe by Nikolai Evreinov
- Produced by: André Paulvé; DisCina; Scalera Film
- Starring: Michel Simon; Ramon Novarro; Jacqueline Delubac; Micheline Presle
- Cinematography: Massimo Terzano; Maurice Desfassiaux
- Edited by: Jacques Manuel; Eraldo Da Roma
- Music by: Jacques Ibert (French version); Songs by Paul Misraki; Mario Carta (Italian version)
- Production company: Scalera
- Release dates: 23 December 1940 (Italy); 23 July 1942 (France)
- Running time: 108 minutes
- Countries: France; Italy
- Languages: French; Italian

La Comédie du bonheur ( "the comedy of happiness") is a French-Italian film directed by Marcel L'Herbier as a dual-language production. It was filmed in Rome in the early months of 1940, but after Italy joined World War II on the side of Germany, the French and Italian versions of the film were completed separately. The Italian version was released in December 1940 under the title Ecco la felicità! ("Here's happiness"). The French version was released in July 1942.

== Plot ==
When the wealthy banker François Jourdain tries to spend his money on philanthropic causes, his relatives have him committed to a psychiatric clinic to save their inheritance. During Mardi Gras celebrations, Jourdain escapes and takes up residence in the Pension Beau Soleil, a run-down boarding house in Nice inhabited by several unhappy individuals, including the owner's shy daughter Lydia, the suicidal Russian exile Fédor, and the embittered spinster Miss Aglaé. Jourdain hires some actors from the local theatre to play roles in real life at the boarding house which will transform the lives of everyone, illustrating his principle: "To create the happiness of others is difficult. But it's enough to create the illusion of happiness."

The leading actor and tenor Félix courts Lydia and makes her feel loved, his wife Anita awakens the interest of Fédor, and Déribin overcomes his aversion to Aglaé and listens to her complaints. Meanwhile Jourdain's relatives have offered a large reward for his recapture and the police are searching for him. To bring his scheme to its completion, Jourdain organises a fancy-dress ball which culminates in an invasion of the local studios of Radio Azur by all the masked revellers, and a succession of mistaken identities, tricks and unmaskings results in the confused satisfaction of almost everyone. But Jourdain has to surrender himself and return to the asylum.

== Cast ==
- Michel Simon as François Jourdain / Giambattista Giordano (Italian version)
- Ramon Novarro as Félix / Felice Ciatti
- Micheline Presle as Lydia / Lidia
- Jacqueline Delubac as Anita / Annetta
- Louis Jourdan as Fédor / Fedoro
- Sylvie as Madame Marie
- André Alerme as Déribin
- Magdeleine Bérubet as Miss Aglaé / Egle
- Marcel Vallée as Doctor Acario
- René Génin
- Ève Francis as Madame Estella, the fortune-teller
- Jaque Catelain as the director of Radio Azur

== Production ==
Marcel L'Herbier had wanted for many years to make a film from Nikolai Evreinov's 1921 play Samoe glavnoe which, as La Comédie du bonheur, had enjoyed success on stage in the 1920s in France and elsewhere. He had obtained the author's approval for his ideas on how to adapt it, and in 1930 L'Herbier had signed a contract with a producer to make the film as the second of a two-film deal. However in the event financial difficulties obliged the producer to default on the deal. It was another ten years before circumstances allowed the project to proceed with a new producer, André Paulvé, and it did so under the imminent threat of World War II breaking out in Europe. A co-production was planned with the Italian company Scalera, to be filmed at their studios in Rome.

Poster for Ecco la felicità! on its release in Italy in December 1940.

A prestigious cast was assembled led by Michel Simon, and it included early appearances by Micheline Presle and Louis Jourdan (his first completed film). The Mexican-American star of silent films Ramon Novarro also joined the company for one of the few films that he made outside Hollywood.

Filming began in Rome in March 1940 and proceeded smoothly, while the "phoney war" continued between France and Germany but Italy had not yet joined the war. In early May however the French ambassador in Rome warned L'Herbier that Italy's declaration of war was imminent and it became necessary for the French actors and technicians to make their arrangements to leave the country as soon as possible, with some of their contributions to the film unfinished. The film negative remained in Rome, and it subsequently suffered some damage in a fire.

An Italian-language version of the film was completed later in the year, and it was released in Italy in December 1940 under the title Ecco la felicità!. The credits list only the Italian contributors to it, except for the director and the four principal (non-Italian) actors. In addition to the cinematographer Massimo Terzano, the camera operatore is listed as Mario Bava.

Back in occupied France, L'Herbier was unable to do anything more with the film until more than a year later when the film was secretly returned to him from Rome. He then sought to complete filming of the missing parts, reassembling the actors who were still available and resorting to special effects for those who were not. The material was carefully edited and fine-tuned to bring his long-cherished but much thwarted project to fruition, and it was released in Paris in July 1942. This French version of La Comédie du bonheur consequently shows significant differences from the Italian Ecco la felicità! in the filming and editing of some sequences, and in some instances the casting.

== Reception ==
The French release of the film coincided with that of another film which Marcel L'Herbier had completed in the meantime, La Nuit fantastique. Both films were comedies which gave contemporary reviews the opportunity to make direct comparison between them. The performances of Micheline Presle, who appeared in both films, and of Michel Simon in La Comédie du bonheur were singled out for particular praise.
