= The Honourable Catherine =

1943 film directed by Marcel L'Herbier

- Directed by: Marcel L'Herbier; Jacques de Baroncelli
- Written by: Jean-Georges Auriol; Henri Jeanson; Marcel L'Herbier; Solange Térac
- Starring: Edwige Feuillère; Raymond Rouleau; André Luguet
- Cinematography: Pierre Montazel
- Edited by: Suzanne Catelain
- Music by: Henri Sauguet; Colette Vivia
- Production companies: Films Orange; SOFROR
- Distributed by: Védis
- Release date: 4 February 1943
- Running time: 99 minutes
- Country: France
- Language: French

The Honourable Catherine (French: L'honorable Catherine) is a 1943 French comedy film directed by Marcel L'Herbier and starring Edwige Feuillère, Raymond Rouleau and André Luguet. Some of the film's final scenes were directed by an uncredited Jacques de Baroncelli. It was shot at the Buttes-Chaumont Studios in Paris. The film's sets were designed by the art director André Barsacq.

== Cast ==
- Edwige Feuillère as Catherine Roussel
- Raymond Rouleau as Jacques Tavère
- André Luguet as Pierre Morland
- Charles Granval as Jérôme
- Denise Grey as Madame d'Ambroisie
- Fred Pasquali as Le vendeur de carillon
- Hubert de Malet as Maurice
- Irène Lud as Lily
- Sinoël as Un invité
- Georges Pally as Xavier
- Jeanne Fusier-Gir as Une invitée
- Claude Génia as Gisèle Morland
- René Blancard as L'employé
- Pierre Cueille as Un invité
- Marfa d'Hervilly as Une invitée
- Louis de Nalair as Un inspecteur
- Maxime Fabert as Un invité
- Louis Florencie as Le brigadier
- Geo Forster as Un dîneur
- Georges Jamin as Un invité
- Dany Lamar as Une invitée
- Léon Larive as Le commissaire
- Palmyre Levasseur as La femme de ménage
- Albert Malbert as Un agent
- Maurice Marceau as Le laveur de vitres
- Noëlle Norman as Une invitée
- Jean Rigaux as Un invité
- Maurice Salabert as Un inspecteur
- Roger Vincent as Un invite

== Bibliography ==
- Rège, Philippe. Encyclopedia of French Film Directors, Volume 1. Scarecrow Press, 2009.
