= The Last Days of Pompeii (1950 film) =

1950 film directed by Paolo Moffa, Marcel L'Herbier

- Directed by: Marcel L'Herbier; Paolo Moffa
- Screenplay by: Pierre Brive; Diego Fabbri; Marcel L'Herbier; Jean Laviron; Paolo Moffa; Antonio Pietrangeli; Guglielmo Santangelo; Alexandre Arnoux (French dialogue)
- Based on: The Last Days of Pompeii 1834 novel by Edward Bulwer-Lytton
- Produced by: Salvo D'Angelo
- Starring: Micheline Presle; Georges Marchal
- Cinematography: Roger Hubert
- Edited by: Gisa Radicchi Levi
- Music by: Roman Vlad; G. R. Aldo
- Release date: 1950
- Running time: 98 minutes
- Country: Italy / France
- Language: French / Italian

The Last Days of Pompeii (1950) (French: Les Derniers Jours de Pompéi) (Italian: Gli ultimi giorni di Pompei) is a black and white French-Italian historical drama, directed by Marcel L'Herbier "in collaboration with" Paolo Moffa, who was also the director of production. It was adapted from Edward Bulwer-Lytton's novel The Last Days of Pompeii. The film has also been known as Sins of Pompeii.

== Plot ==
In Pompeii, in the year 79AD, Lysias, a wealthy young Greek, abducts the beautiful Hélène, who is a pupil of Arbax, the sinister High Priest of Isis. For revenge, Arbax causes Lysias to drink a magic potion to make him fall in love with his ally Julie, but Lysias becomes mad from the drink. Nidia, a young slave girl rescued by Lysias, has overheard the plot and accuses Arbax of trying to kill her master. Arbax kills the girl and has Lysias accused of the murder. Condemned to the lions in the arena, Lysias only escapes the punishment when the eruption of Vesuvius brings panic to the town, and he leads Hélène to safety.

== Cast ==
- Micheline Presle as Elena / Hélène
- Georges Marchal as Lysia / Lysias
- Marcel Herrand as Arbace / Arbax
- Jaque Catelain as Clodio / Claudius
- Adriana Benetti as Nidia
- Laure Alex as Julie
- Camillo Pilotto as Diomede / Diomède
- Antonio Pierfederici as Olinto / Olinte
- Guglielmo Barnabò as Panza
- Alain Quercy as Lepido / Lépide

== Production ==
Principal filming took place in the summer of 1948 at the Cinecittà studios in Rome. The amphitheatre scenes were filmed at the Arena di Verona. The production was then interrupted however for nearly a year, and was completed at the GTC studios at Joinville/Saint-Maurice in 1949. The film was released in France and Italy in 1950.

The film considerably simplified the plot of Lytton's novel, and there was some alteration of the names of the principal characters: Glaucus became Lysias, and Ione became Hélène; Nidia was made the victim of Arbax rather than an agent of his defeat.

There were set designs and costumes by Aldo Tommasini and Veniero Colasanti, and special effects by B. de Kerblay. Lucio Fulci was 2nd unit director on the film.

Marcel L'Herbier approached the project as one of the "chroniques filmées" ("filmed histories") which his film work had favoured during the previous decade, giving some emphasis to the documentary aspects of the everyday life that had been preserved at Pompeii. He initially approached Albert Camus to write the dialogue (having in mind the latter's play Caligula), but in the event the task was undertaken by Alexandre Arnoux. L'Herbier admitted some reservation about the resulting film in spite of its strong cast and opulent settings.
