= Le Vertige =

1926 film directed by Marcel L'Herbier

- Directed by: Marcel l'Herbier
- Release date: 9 July 1926
- Country: France
- Language: Silent film

Le Vertige is a 1926 French film directed by Marcel l'Herbier, who wrote the screenplay based upon the play by Charles Méré.

== Cast ==
- Emmy Lynn as Natacha Svirsky
- Jaque Catelain as Henri de Cassel
- Roger Karl as General Svirsky
- Claire Prélia as Madame de Cassel

== Production ==
Robert and Sonia Delaunay and Robert Mallet-Stevens contributed to the set and costume design for the film.
