= Le Bonheur (1934 film) =

- Directed by: Marcel L'Herbier
- Written by: Marcel L'Herbier; Michel Duran (dialogue); Henri Bernstein (play)
- Produced by: Pathé-Natan
- Starring: Charles Boyer; Gaby Morlay; Michel Simon
- Cinematography: Harry Stradling
- Edited by: Jacques Manuel
- Music by: Billy Colson
- Production company: Pathé-Natan
- Distributed by: Pathé-Natan
- Release date: 15 September 1934 (Paris)
- Running time: 111 minutes
- Country: France
- Language: French

Le Bonheur ("Happiness") is a 1934 French comedy-drama film directed by Marcel L'Herbier. It was adapted from Henri Bernstein's play Le Bonheur, which Bernstein had staged in Paris in March 1933 with Charles Boyer and Michel Simon in leading roles; Boyer and Simon took the same parts in the film.

== Background ==
In 1934 Marcel L'Herbier held discussions with Charles Boyer on making a film about the actor Edmund Kean, but Boyer, whose career was at that time shifting between France and Hollywood, insisted that he wanted to film Bernstein's play Le Bonheur in which he had recently starred on stage in Paris. The rights to the play were held by the Pathé-Natan company, who also had a contract with Gaby Morlay, the preferred actress of both Boyer and L'Herbier for the other leading role.

== Plot ==
Philippe Lutcher, an anarchist, fires a shot at Clara Stuart, a famous stage and screen actress, but only wounds her. The star, through affectation and curiosity to know his motives, pleads in his favour at his trial, but he rebuffs her pity. After he has served 18 months in prison, they meet and fall in love. Philippe however doubts Clara's sincerity, and when he sees incidents from their lives becoming part of her latest film, he leaves her. He vows that their love will continue when he sits in the dark and watches her on the cinema screen.

== Cast ==
- Gaby Morlay as Clara Stuart
- Charles Boyer as Philippe Lutcher
- Paulette Dubost as Louise
- Michel Simon as Noël Malpiaz
- Jaque Catelain as Geoffroy de Chabré
- Jean Toulout as Maître Balbant
- Georges Mauloy as the President of Assises
- Léon Arvel as the general state attorney

== Production ==
L'Herbier himself adapted Bernstein's play for the screenplay, in collaboration with Michel Duran for the dialogue, remaining mostly faithful to the original text while creating opportunities to use visual means of expression in place of verbal ones. He did however introduce some significant changes. The background of the cinema in the life of the actress Clara Stuart is given greater emphasis, and the introduction of the anarchist Philippe in the opening scenes establishes him in the role of a spectator of the actress, a relationship which is renewed in a new sense for the final scene of the film. Cinema is given a further element of self-reflexivity in the scenes of the film-within-the-film which is shown to be shot at the Joinville Studios with Harry Stradling as the cameraman, just like Le Bonheur.

Filming took place at the Joinville studios in Paris in September and October 1934. L'Herbier's assistant directors were Ève Francis and Jean Dréville.

Towards the end of filming, L'Herbier suffered an accident when a camera fell on him from an insecure track. He suffered a broken wrist and permanent damage to one eye. He undertook a prolonged legal action against the Pathé company in which the director argued for his status as an 'author' of the film rather than just a technician employed by the company. He eventually won the case, and it marked the first time that a film director in France was legally recognised as having rights of authorship in his work.

== Reception ==
On its release Le Bonheur proved popular with the public and was mostly well received by the French critics. Henry Bernstein also expressed his approval of the way that his play had been adapted for the cinema. However, after three years of distribution the film largely disappeared from sight for nearly 40 years. It was only in the 1970s that it was revived and recognised as one of the most significant achievements among L'Herbier's sound films.

In February 1935, the film was shown at the first Moscow Film Festival (albeit too late for the main competition) and it received a special "mention of honour" from the Soviet jury.

== Home media ==
A 2K digital restoration of the film made by Pathé in 2013 was issued on Blu-ray and DVD in 2014.
