= Divine (1935 film) =

- Directed by: Max Ophüls
- Written by: Colette; Jean-Georges Auriol; Max Ophüls
- Starring: Simone Berriau; George Rigaud; Gina Manès
- Cinematography: Roger Hubert
- Edited by: Léonide Moguy
- Music by: Albert Wolff
- Production company: Eden Productions
- Release date: 22 November 1935
- Running time: 82 minutes
- Country: France
- Language: French

Divine is a 1935 French drama film directed by Max Ophüls and starring Simone Berriau, George Rigaud and Gina Manès. It was shot at the Billancourt Studios in Paris and on location in Hyeres. The film's sets were designed by the art director Jacques Gotko and Robert Gys.

== Synopsis ==
A girl from the countryside travels to Paris, only to find herself working in a music hall.

== Cast ==
- Simone Berriau as Divine
- George Rigaud as Le Lait
- Gina Manès as Dora
- Philippe Hériat as Lutuf-Allah
- Sylvette Fillacier as Gitanette
- Paul Azaïs as Victor
- Catherine Fonteney as Mme Jarisse
- Thérèse Dorny as La Poison
- Jeanne Fusier-Gir as Mme. Nicou, Concierge
- Jeanne Véniat as Mme Martelli
- Nane Germon as Zaza
- Yvette Lebon as Roberte
- Marcel Vallée as Le Directeur
- Roger Gaillard as Pierre Paul
- André Gabriello as Coirol
- Pierre Juvenet as Le concierge
- Floyd Du Pont as Fergusson
- Lucien Callamand as 1er Police Inspecteur
- Tony Murcy as 2ème Inspecteur

== Bibliography ==
- Williams, Alan L. Republic of Images: A History of French Filmmaking. Harvard University Press, 1992.
