= Le Carnaval des vérités =

1920 film directed by Marcel L'Herbier

- Directed by: Marcel L'Herbier
- Written by: Marcel L'Herbier
- Starring: Suzanne Desprès; Paul Capellani
- Cinematography: Georges Lucas
- Distributed by: Gaumont
- Release date: 4 June 1920
- Running time: 89 minutes (@ 18f/s): 1831 metres.
- Country: France
- Language: Silent film
- Budget: 176,360 FF.

Le Carnaval des vérités is a 1920 French silent film written and directed by Marcel L'Herbier.

== Background ==
After completing a commercial film for Léon Gaumont, Marcel L'Herbier was offered a contract to work on a prestigious series of films which would be known as "Gaumont Série Pax". Although the terms of the contract placed unwelcome restrictions upon his control over his work, L'Herbier realised that it also offered him an unparalleled opportunity to benefit from the international links of the Gaumont company and to work in the best technical facilities then available. His first project, which he was both to write and to direct, was Le Carnaval des vérités, a symbolist drama about the struggle between Truth and Falsehood.

== Production ==
Filming took place on location on the Basque coast near Biarritz in November 1919 and subsequently at the Studios de La Villette in Paris.

The central role in the film was played by the stage actress Suzanne Desprès, who was making her first appearance in a film. Other parts were taken by the experienced Paul Capellani and two actors who would make regular appearances in L'Herbier's silent films, Marcelle Pradot and Jaque Catelain.

Great emphasis was placed on the visual design of the film, and one of the two set-designers was Claude Autant-Lara, then aged 18 and undertaking his first job in cinema. His work included a "phantasmagoric" set for the climactic scene of the film which featured a masked ball.

== Plot ==
Comtesse Della Gentia and her lover Paul attempt to seduce and blackmail a rich neighbour Juan, who is in love with a naïve young friend of theirs, Clarisse. Their plot fails; the Comtesse kills herself at a ball, and her lover re-covers her face with its mask.

== Cast ==
- Suzanne Desprès, as Madame Della Gentia
- Paul Capellani, as Paul Dorsenne
- Jaque Catelain, as Juan Tristan
- Marcelle Pradot, as Clarisse
- Eugénie Nau, as Madame Aristoy
- Claude France
- Marcelle Chantal
- Philippe Hériat

== Reception ==
On its release in June 1920, the film met with reasonable success both with critics and with the public. The receipts from its release were valued at 188,800 francs, showing a small profit over its costs. Of the six films which L'Herbier made for Gaumont, this seems to have been the only one which did not make a financial loss. Léon Gaumont was sufficiently pleased with the film to allow L'Herbier a larger budget for his next work, L'Homme du large.
