= The New Men (film) =

1936 film directed by Marcel L'Herbier

- Directed by: Marcel L'Herbier
- Written by: Marcel L'Herbier
- Based on: The New Men by Claude Farrère
- Produced by: Albert Lauzin
- Starring: Harry Baur; Natalie Paley; Gabriel Signoret
- Cinematography: Robert Lefebvre
- Edited by: Jacques Manuel
- Music by: Marius-François Gaillard
- Production company: Les Films Albert Lauzin
- Distributed by: Les Films Albert Lauzin
- Release date: 4 March 1936
- Running time: 110 minutes
- Country: France
- Language: French

The New Men (French: Les Hommes nouveaux) is a 1936 French drama film written and directed by Marcel L'Herbier and starring Harry Baur, Natalie Paley and Gabriel Signoret. The film was based on the novel of the same title by Claude Farrère, which had previously been adapted into a 1922 silent film. The film's sets were designed by the art director Robert Gys.

== Synopsis ==
In the early decades of the twentieth century, a group of adventurers are encouraged to settle the southern area of French Morocco. The plot follows the rise of one of these "new men" Bourron, a former docker.

== Cast ==
- Harry Baur as Bourron
- Natalie Paley as Christiane
- Gabriel Signoret as Maréchal Lyautey de Tolly
- Max Michel as Henri de Chassagnes
- Claude Sainval as Jean de Sainte-Foy
- Sylvio De Pedrelli as Medhani, the gangster boss
- Jean Marais as the clerk
- André Numès Fils as Roussignol
- René Bergeron as Mingasse
- Marie-Jacqueline Chantal as the nurse
- Gustave Gallet as Clémenceau
- Ben Gassin as Zerfatti
- André Carnège as the commander
- Hugues de Bagratide as an officier
- Paul Amiot as D'Amade

== Bibliography ==
- Andrew, Dudley & Ungar, Steven. Popular Front Paris and the Poetics of Culture. Harvard University Press, 2005.
- Goble, Alan. The Complete Index to Literary Sources in Film. Walter de Gruyter, 1999.
