= L'Homme du large =

1920 film directed by Marcel L'Herbier

- Directed by: Marcel L'Herbier
- Written by: Marcel L'Herbier (scenario); Honoré de Balzac (story)
- Starring: Jaque Catelain; Roger Karl; Marcelle Pradot
- Cinematography: Georges Lucas
- Edited by: Jaque Catelain; Marcel L'Herbier
- Production company: Gaumont Série Pax
- Release date: 3 December 1920
- Running time: 85 minutes (2256 metres)
- Country: France
- Language: Silent film

L' Homme du large (English: Man of the Sea or Man of the Open Seas) is a 1920 French silent film directed by Marcel L'Herbier and based on a short story by Honoré de Balzac. It was filmed on the rugged southern coast of Brittany creating atmosphere in a film about the forces of good and evil that motivate human behaviour.

== Background ==
After the success of L'Herbier's previous film, Le Carnaval des vérités, Gaumont allowed him more resources for his next project, and in the spring of 1920 he drafted a scenario based loosely on a philosophical short story by Balzac called Un drame au bord de la mer. He said that he wanted to use again the sea of Brittany as a protagonist in a drama, an idea which he had explored previously in his scenario for Le Torrent (1917), but now to treat it more lyrically. He gave his story the title L'Homme du large, and added the subtitle Marine ("seascape").

== Plot ==
Nolff, a devout Breton fisherman, has taken a vow of silence and lives as a hermit beside the sea. No-one comes near him except the white-clad novice who brings him food.

Years before... Full of contempt for mankind and life on land, Nolff has built his house on a remote cliff-top, and devotes himself to his fishing and to his wife and children: his daughter Djenna, hard-working and dutiful, and his son Michel whom he idolises and is determined to bring up as "a free man, a sailor". But Michel is selfish and exploits his father's blind affection, and as he grows up, hating the sea, he becomes addicted to the pleasures of the town, lured into bad behaviour by his friend Guenn-la-Taupe. At an Easter celebration, the only occasion of the year when Nolff and his family join the townspeople in their festivities, Nolff's wife becomes ill, and while she is taken home Michel escapes to a disreputable bar in the town to consort with the dancer Lia. Djenna comes to fetch him to his mother's bedside, but Michel slips back into the bar, where he gets into a fight with Lia's protector and stabs him. Nolff pays for Michel's release from gaol, but when they return home, they find his mother dead.

Needing money to spend on Lia, Michel steals the savings which his mother had kept for Djenna, but he is caught and denounced by Nolff, who vows "to return him to God". Nolff ties Michel in the bottom of an open boat and pushes it out to sea. He then adopts the life of a hermit beside the sea, while Djenna enters a convent. Months later, Djenna receives a letter from Michel: he has survived and is now a changed man, earning his living as a sailor. When Nolff hears that Michel wants to return home, he cries out to the sea in remorse for his judgment of his son.

== Cast ==
- Jaque Catelain as Michel
- Roger Karl as Nolff
- Marcelle Pradot as Djenna
- Claire Prélia as La mère
- Charles Boyer as Guenn-la-Taupe
- Claude Autant-Lara as Un des copains
- Dimitri Dragomir as Un des copains
- Suzanne Doris as Lia
- Philippe Hériat as Le protecteur
- Lili Samuel as La lesbienne
- Georges Forois as Le pêcheur
- Pâquerette as La tenancière

== Production ==
In June 1920, L'Herbier took a large crew to Brittany for location shooting around the coasts of Morbihan and Finistère, where he sought the wild landscapes which would establish the story's moral contrast between the pure grandeur of the sea and the corrupt temptations of the town. For the first time he had an "assistant director", a young man called Raymond Payelle who would soon take the professional name of Philippe Hériat. Also in his team as a set-designer was Claude Autant-Lara, and both he and Hériat also played small parts in the film. In another supporting role, Charles Boyer made his début in the cinema.

L'Herbier's structure for the narrative was unusual in that it started at the end and then told the story in flashback: he claimed that this was the first time that this device had been used in the cinema. Despite his claim, this frame narrative technique had been utilized by multiple directors in the preceding years, notably by Irvin Willat in Behind the Door.

L'Herbier also took a novel approach to the use of some of his intertitles which, instead of being inserted between shots of the film, were integrated into the image itself so that they formed part of the visual design and did not interrupt the flow of the film.

A detailed programme of tinting for the entire film gave a complex interplay of colour contrasts, both between scenes and in individual sequences: for instance, the scenes in the town bar (the "bouge") are tinted in a lurid red, and intercut with the mauve-tinted scenes showing the feverish mother at home.

Jaque Catelain assisted L'Herbier with the editing of the film.

As soon as it was finished, Léon Gaumont indicated to L'Herbier that he would like another film from him, a lighter one to contrast with the sombre drama of L'Homme du large, so that the two could be presented together. L'Herbier rapidly devised a pastiche of a tale of Oscar Wilde and a parody of a detective story which was called Villa Destin: it carried the subtitle Humoresque. The two films received their trade showing together on 31 October 1920.

== Reception ==
The first public screening of L'Homme du large took place on 3 December 1920 at the Gaumont Palace in Paris. It was enthusiastically received by both the public and the press. Its critical reputation was well-sustained in subsequent years. Film archivist Henri Langlois described it as "the first example of film writing". He argued that the film was not just a narrative of events linked together by intertitles, but a sequence of images whose message conveyed an idea; the superimposed titles reinforced the images in the manner of ideograms. While some critics were troubled by the contrast between the film's natural environment of coast and sea and its aesthetic use of frequent editing wipes, irises and superimpositions, there was broader appreciation for the rhythmic structure of shots and sequences, forming what L'Herbier saw as a "musical composition".

Less welcome recognition came from the French censor. One week after the film's release it had to be withdrawn from screening because of objections to parts of the scene of the "bouge" which showed some lascivious kissing and caresses between two women. L'Herbier negotiated with the censor and made some small cuts in the scene, so as "to show less and suggest more". Screenings of the film resumed, and some months later L'Herbier re-inserted the censored material into the original negative.

== Restoration ==
In 1998 a detailed restoration of the film was undertaken by CNC Archives françaises du film and Gaumont. It involved the reconstruction of many of the intertitles and the scheme of colour tinting using L'Herbier's original notes. The work was completed for presentation in 2001. An original orchestral score was composed by Antoine Duhamel. A DVD of the restored version was issued by Gaumont in 2009.
