= The Cheat (1937 film) =

1937 film directed by Marcel L'Herbier

- French: Forfaiture
- Directed by: Marcel L'Herbier
- Written by: Jean-Georges Auriol; Jacques Companéez; Herbert Juttke; Jacques Natanson; Hector Turnbull
- Produced by: Michael Salkind; Pierre Braunberger; Ayres d'Aguiar; Roger Richebé
- Starring: Victor Francen; Sessue Hayakawa; Louis Jouvet
- Cinematography: Eugen Schüfftan
- Edited by: Pierre de Hérain; Marie Le Bars
- Music by: Michel Michelet
- Production company: Société du Cinéma du Panthéon
- Distributed by: Gray-Film
- Release date: 24 November 1937
- Running time: 94 minutes
- Country: France
- Language: French

The Cheat (French: Forfaiture) is a 1937 French drama film directed by Marcel L'Herbier and starring Victor Francen, Sessue Hayakawa and Louis Jouvet. It is a remake of the American silent film The Cheat by Cecil B. DeMille.

The film's sets were designed by the art director Robert Gys. It was shot at the Billancourt Studios in Paris.

== Main cast ==
- Victor Francen as Pierre Moret
- Sessue Hayakawa as Prince Hu-Long
- Louis Jouvet as Valfar
- Lise Delamare as Denise Moret
- Lucas Gridoux as Tang-Si
- Ève Francis as Mrs. Curtis
- Lucien Nat as Maître Ribeyre
- Pierre Magnier as Le Président de la société
- Jean Brochard as Félicien
- Sylvia Bataille as Ming

== Bibliography ==
- Kennedy-Karpat, Colleen. Rogues, Romance, and Exoticism in French Cinema of the 1930s. Fairleigh Dickinson, 2013.
