= Robert Gys =

French art director

- Born: 22 September 1901; Asnières-sur-Seine, Hauts-de-Seine, France
- Died: 15 November 1977 (aged 76); Cagnes-sur-Mer, Alpes-Maritimes, France
- Other name: Robert Albert Eugène Gigault
- Occupation: Art director
- Years active: 1923-1960 (film)

Robert Gys (1901–1977) was a French art director.

== Selected filmography ==
- Imperial Violets (1924)
- The Phantom of the Moulin Rouge (1925)
- Miss Europe (1930)
- Dance Hall (1931)
- The Dream (1931)
- I'll Be Alone After Midnight (1931)
- Imperial Violets (1932)
- The Barber of Seville (1933)
- The Surprises of Divorce (1933)
- The Concierge's Daughters (1934)
- Cease Firing (1934)
- One Night's Secret (1934)
- The Scandal (1934)
- Gold in the Street (1934)
- The Mysteries of Paris (1935)
- Divine (1935)
- Little One (1935)
- Pasteur (1935)
- His Excellency Antonin (1935)
- The Last Waltz (1936)
- Let's Make a Dream (1936)
- The Great Refrain (1936)
- The New Men (1936)
- Compliments of Mister Flow (1936)
- The Two Boys (1936)
- The Cheat (1937)
- Boissière (1937)
- Double Crime in the Maginot Line (1937)
- Alert in the Mediterranean (1938)
- The Lafarge Case (1938)
- The Rebel (1938)
- Chéri-Bibi (1938)
- The Fatted Calf (1939)
- Sacred Woods (1939)
- Deputy Eusèbe (1939)
- Whirlwind of Paris (1939)
- Two Women (1940)
- Foolish Husbands (1941)
- Carmen (1942)
- Voyage Without Hope (1943)
- The Devil Goes to Boarding School (1944)
- The Bellman (1945)
- Goodbye Darling (1946)
- A Friend Will Come Tonight (1946)
- Loves, Delights and Organs (1947)
- Ballerina (1950)
- The Cape of Hope (1951)
- When You Read This Letter (1953)
- Madame du Barry (1954)
- Typhoon Over Nagasaki (1957)
- Not Delivered (1958)

== Bibliography ==
- Martin O'Shaughnessy. Jean Renoir. Manchester University Press, 2000.
