= The Scandal (1923 film) =

1923 film

- Directed by: Arthur Rooke
- Written by: Henry Bataille (play); Kinchen Wood
- Starring: Henry Victor; Edward O'Neill; Vanni Marcoux
- Production company: I.B. Davidson
- Distributed by: Granger
- Release date: June 1923
- Countries: France; United Kingdom
- Languages: Silent; English intertitles

The Scandal is a 1923 British-French silent drama film directed by Arthur Rooke and starring Henry Victor, Edward O'Neill and Vanni Marcoux.

== Cast ==
- Henry Victor as Artenezzo
- Edward O'Neill as Jeannetier
- Vanni Marcoux as Maurice Ferrioul
- Adeline de La Croix as Mme. Ferrioul
- Hilda Bayley as Charlotte

== See also ==
- Le Scandale (1934)

== Bibliography ==
- Palmer, Scott. British Film Actors' Credits, 1895-1987. McFarland, 1998.
