= El Dorado (1921 film) =

1921 film by Marcel L'Herbier

- Cover for DVD of El Dorado (1921)
- Directed by: Marcel L'Herbier
- Written by: Marcel L'Herbier
- Produced by: Gaumont Série Pax
- Starring: Ève Francis; Jaque Catelain; Philippe Hériat; Marcelle Pradot
- Cinematography: Georges Lucas; Georges Specht
- Music by: Marius-François Gaillard
- Distributed by: Gaumont
- Release date: 28 October 1921
- Running time: 98 minutes
- Country: France
- Languages: Silent film French intertitles
- Budget: FF 400,000

El Dorado is a French silent film directed in 1921 by Marcel L'Herbier. The film was notable for integrating a number of technical innovations into its narrative of a "cinematic melodrama". It achieved considerable success on its release, as a ground-breaking film that was distinctively French at a time when the cinema was felt to be dominated by American productions.

== Background ==
In his previous five films Marcel L'Herbier had explored a variety of photographic and narrative techniques in the fast-developing medium of film, and in 1921 he wanted to draw them together in the context of a story which would have a broad appeal for the public. He was also eager to film in the landscapes of Spain which had long been an inspiration for him, especially as filtered through the writings of Maurice Barrès. He submitted an original scenario for a melodrama called El Dorado, set in Andalusia, to his producer Léon Gaumont, and rather to his surprise it was immediately accepted. L'Herbier was adamant that the film should carry the subtitle "mélodrame", both to indicate the popular origins of its story, but also to point to its more traditional sense of the combination of drama and music. He was less candid about his intentions for incorporating imaginative and unconventional visual effects into his familiar subject-matter.

An initial budget of 92,000 francs was allocated, but in the end the film cost nearly 400,000 francs.

== Synopsis ==
In Granada in Spain, Sibilla works as a dancer in a squalid cabaret called El Dorado, struggling to earn enough to care for her sick child. The boy's father Estiria, a prominent citizen, refuses them both help and recognition, fearful of jeopardising the engagement of his adult daughter Iliana to a wealthy nobleman. Iliana however slips away from her engagement party to meet her real lover Hedwick, a Swedish painter. Sibilla, in desperation after a further rejection by Estiria, sees an opportunity to blackmail him by locking the lovers overnight in their meeting-place in the Alhambra. Sibilla confesses her action to Hedwick, who hides Iliana in El Dorado while he appeals to her father. Faced with Estiria's unremitting rage, Hedwick and Iliana decide to take refuge at his mother's remote house on the Sierra Nevada, and they propose to Sibilla that they take her son (revealed to Iliana as her half-brother) with them so that he can be properly cared for in a healthy climate. Sibilla reluctantly agrees, but she is distraught as she returns to her empty room at El Dorado where she even has to fight off Joao, the cabaret's clown, as he tries to rape her. Knowing that she will not see her son again, she performs a last dance on stage to rapturous applause before going backstage to stab herself.

== Cast ==
- Ève Francis as Sibilla
- Jaque Catelain as the young painter Hedwick
- Marcelle Pradot as Hedwick's lover Iliana
- Philippe Hériat as the lecherous clown Joao
- Georges Paulais as Estiria, the father of Sibilla's son
- Claire Prélia as the Swedish mother of Hedwick

== Production ==
A substantial part of the film was to be shot on location in Granada, Seville and the Sierra Nevada, and filming began in March 1921. For the first time ever, permission had been granted for a film company to shoot inside the Alhambra palace and L'Herbier gave prominent place to its gardens, fountains and geometric architectural patterns. These became some of the film's most memorable images. During the approach to Easter, he also seized the chance to film the spectacular Holy Week processions which took place in Seville and to incorporate this documentary footage within the fiction of his story. The interiors were subsequently filmed at the Gaumont studios in Paris at Buttes-Chaumont.

With his principal cameraman Georges Lucas, L'Herbier created a number of optical effects during filming. When Sibilla is first introduced among the other dancers on stage, a partial blurring of the image places her out-of-focus while those around her are sharply defined, an effect repeated in her subsequent dance to suggest that she herself is not fully focussed on her surroundings because her mind is preoccupied with the plight of her son. Distortion of close-up images of customers in the cabaret reflect their intoxication and lust. A similar technique is used later to introduce a note of visual horror into the scene when Joao tries to rape Sibilla. A different use of optical distortion in the scenes of Hedwick at work in the Alhambra shows how the actual settings of his paintings are transformed in the painter's imagination. L'Herbier was at pains to draw a distinction between his approach and that used in The Cabinet of Dr. Caligari (1920) in which visual distortions are incorporated into the design of the sets - which were then photographed normally. In El Dorado it is the camera itself which is used to shape the images seen by the viewer. These uses of semi-subjective camerawork have been one of the most discussed aspects of the film in subsequent criticism.

L'Herbier was an ardent advocate of colour tinting of the finished photographic image, and he devised an elaborate scheme of colouring to enhance the effect of different scenes and shots, and sometimes to clarify the shift between the present and a past flashback. (A surviving print held by the Cinémathèque Française preserves these tinted effects.)

L'Herbier regarded the musical accompaniment of a film as being supremely important, and in El Dorado he sought to produce a closer integration between image and music than had been achieved before. He commissioned the young composer Marius-François Gaillard (who was only 21) to compose an orchestral score which was based upon the final cut of the film. This allowed the music to be precisely synchronised with the action of the film instead of the rather approximate playing of 'mood music' which was then common practice. L'Herbier claimed that this was the first time that an exactly synchronised orchestral score had been written for a film, and although full scores for films had been previously produced in Europe and USA, this was at least a pioneering example of music written as an exact counterpoint to the image.

L'Herbier enjoyed complete artistic freedom during filming but his relations with his producer Léon Gaumont deteriorated as the schedule and the budget both exceeded expectations. Gaumont was not impressed by the 'artistic' visual devices of blurred and distorted images. When the film was first shown to him, he angrily interrupted the screening to demand that the projectionist should correct his equipment, and he was scarcely mollified when it was explained that these were a deliberate part of the director's vision.

== Reception ==
When the film was first shown to the press in July 1921, it met with widespread critical acclaim. The newspaper Bonsoir unprecedentedly devoted a whole page to its review in which three different critics were unanimous in their recognition of the film's historic importance. Another critic appreciated that the use of a melodramatic subject did not prevent the film from achieving "a magnificent poetry". There was particular praise for the performance of Éve Francis who achieves an intense tragic grandeur in the final scenes. The critic and film-maker Louis Delluc gave the film perhaps its most succinct judgment: "Ça, c'est du cinéma!" ("That's cinema!")

There were a few dissenting voices including the poet and critic Ricciotto Canudo, who felt that the film's pictorial effects were insufficiently grounded in the subject.

When the film was released to the public in October 1921 it enjoyed a broad success, even though some spectators were sufficiently impatient with the visual effects to make occasionally vocal protests.

The considerable reputation which the film won in the 1920s was largely confined to France at that time since it does not appear to have been distributed abroad.

Among those who subsequently felt the influence of El Dorado was Alain Resnais who "sought to renew a certain style of silent cinema" when he was making L'Année dernière à Marienbad.

== Restoration ==
A restoration of El Dorado was carried out for Gaumont in 1995 by the Service des Archives du Film du CNC, in collaboration with the Museum of Modern Art (New York), the Cinémathèque française, and the Swiss Film Archive. A DVD based on this restoration, accompanied by archival material, was released by Gaumont in 2002.
