= Little Devil May Care =

1928 film directed by Marcel L'Herbier

Little Devil-May-Care
- Directed by: Marcel L'Herbier
- Written by: Marcel L'Herbier
- Based on: the novel L'Ex-voto by Lucie Delarue-Mardrus
- Starring: Betty Balfour; Jaque Catelain; Roger Karl
- Cinematography: Jean Letort; Lucien Bellavoine; Louis Le Bertre
- Production companies: Cinégraphic; Gaumont-British
- Distributed by: Pathé Consortium Cinéma
- Release date: 3 March 1928 (France)
- Running time: 120 minutes
- Country: France / UK
- Language: Silent

Little Devil-May-Care (or The Devil in the Heart) (French: Le Diable au cœur) is a 1928 French-British silent drama film directed by Marcel L'Herbier and starring Betty Balfour, Jaque Catelain and Roger Karl.

== Plot ==
In a small coastal town Ludivine, a fisherman's daughter, falls in love with Delphin, an orphaned boy who comes to live with them. But her father wants her to marry Lauderin, the lecherous manager of a local cabaret-bar.

== Cast ==
- Betty Balfour as Ludivine Bucaille
- Jaque Catelain as Delphin Leherg
- Roger Karl as Bucaille, Ludivine's father
- André Nox as Pierre Lauderin
- Kissa Kouprine as Thania
- Catherine Fonteney as Madame Bucaille, Ludivine's mother
- Magda Aranyi as Lauderin's stepmother
- Leo Da Costa as Gaston Lauderin
- André Heuzé as André Bucaille
- Auguste Picaude as Maurice Bucaille
- Falcau as Lauderin's brother
- Jane Pierson as a woman
- Marie Glory as a young thief

== Production ==
L'Herbier had originally made an agreement with the Gaumont-British company to film Labiche's stage farce Un chapeau de paille d'Italie with the popular English actress Betty Balfour. When that project was delayed, the filming rights were ceded to René Clair who was also eager to adapt the work, and L'Herbier proceeded with an alternative adaptation of a novel by Lucie Delarue-Mardrus set in a Breton fishing community.

Filming began, in November 1926, on location at Honfleur, and then at the Studios de la Villette in Paris and the Victorine Studios in Nice, but the production was beset with problems. Soon after filming began several leading members of the cast became ill, including Balfour, and the production had to be halted for a time, incurring greater costs. When they had resumed, the actor Auguste Mévisto, playing Ludivine's father, suddenly died, and several scenes had to be refilmed with his replacement Roger Karl. Further difficulties were caused by the panchromatic film which was being used for the first time in a French production, and technical inexperience with this filmstock produced a number of unforeseen problems. L'Herbier subsequently felt that, despite the film's appealing elements and the vivacious humour of Betty Balfour, the finished product lacked rigorous consistency.

The film's sets were designed by Claude Autant-Lara, Lucien Aguettand, and Robert-Jules Garnier.

== Preservation ==
The film has been restored by the CNC Archives françaises du film, and a DVD was released with the book Marcel L'Herbier: l'art du cinéma in 2007.
