= L'Épervier =

1933 film directed by Marcel L'Herbier

- Directed by: Marcel L'Herbier
- Written by: Marcel L'Herbier; Jean-Georges Auriol
- Based on: Francis de Croisset (play)
- Produced by: Impérial Film
- Starring: Charles Boyer; Natalie Paley
- Cinematography: Jules Kruger
- Music by: Henri Sauguet
- Release dates: 17 November 1933 (France); 8 December 1940 (USA)
- Running time: 106 minutes
- Country: France
- Language: French

L'Épervier (The Sparrowhawk), is a French drama film from 1933, directed and written by Marcel L'Herbier, starring Charles Boyer and Natalie Paley. The film was based on a play by Francis de Croisset. It was also known in the US under the title Les Amoureux.

== Cast ==
- Charles Boyer : Comte Georges de Dasetta
- Natalie Paley : Marina (as Nathalie Paley)
- Marguerite Templey : Madame de Tierrache
- George Grossmith Jr. : Erik Drakton
- Pierre Richard-Willm : René de Tierrache
- Jean Marais : (uncredited)
- Jean Toulout
- Loni Nest
- Viviane Romance
- Gérard Landry
- Christian-Gérard
- Spadolini
