= Veille d'armes =

1935 film directed by Marcel L'Herbier

- Film poster
- Directed by: Marcel L'Herbier
- Written by: Marcel L'Herbier; Charles Spaak
- Based on: La Veille d'armes by Claude Farrère and Lucien Népoty
- Starring: Annabella; Victor Francen
- Cinematography: Jules Kruger
- Music by: Jean Lenoir
- Production company: Impérial Films
- Release date: 13 December 1935
- Running time: 120 minutes
- Country: France
- Language: French

Veille d'armes ("eve of battle") is a 1935 French drama film directed by Marcel L'Herbier and starring Annabella and Victor Francen.

== Synopsis ==
1935. Captain de Corlaix is the respected commander of a French naval cruiser, the Alma, anchored at Toulon and awaiting orders to depart on a secret mission. A celebratory ball is held on board at which de Corlaix's young wife Jeanne is introduced to his officers. These include the newly-arrived Lieutenant d'Artelles with whom Jeanne had an abruptly terminated love-affair before her marriage, and in her confusion at seeing him again she tells her husband the lie that she has never met d'Artelles before. Jeanne seeks to speak privately to d'Artelles to make clear that she now loves her husband, but she finds herself accidentally locked in his cabin when the ship unexpectedly puts to sea to join the hunt for a foreign renegade cruiser. A naval engagement ensues in which the Alma is sunk. Jeanne in disguise escapes in a lifeboat; d'Artelles is killed; de Corlaix survives with injuries.

Back in France, de Corlaix faces trial in a naval court for negligence in command, and he finds no witnesses who can verify his account of events. Jeanne, who has not admitted her presence on the ship, realises that only she can provide the evidence her husband needs, and she reveals her story to the court, while compromising her reputation. De Corlaix is acquitted. He is persuaded against resignation from the navy and is reconciled with his wife.

== Cast ==
- Annabella as Jeanne de Corlaix
- Victor Francen as Captain de Corlaix
- Gabriel Signoret as Admiral Morbraz
- Pierre Renoir as Commander Branbourg
- Rosine Deréan as Alice, the sister of Jeanne
- Robert Vidalin as Lieutenant d'Artelles
- Roland Toutain as sailor Le Duc

== Production ==
In early 1935 Marcel L'Herbier was approached by the producer Joseph Lucachevitch who was planning a large-scale film which could match the increasingly dominant films imported to France from America. He proposed an adaptation of the 1917 play La Veille d'armes by Claude Farrère and Lucien Népoty, about the compromised relationship of the commander of a French battleship and his wife. L'Herbier was sceptical about the story, but he was attracted by the opportunity to make a patriotic French drama at a time when he saw the growth of militarism in Germany as a serious threat.

Lucachevitch had also secured the support of the French government and the cooperation of the Marine Nationale which would enable L'Herbier to give emphasis to a documentary aspect of the film, showing in detail the physical conditions and procedures of life on a naval vessel. To represent the fictional Alma in the story the navy's cruiser Dupleix was made available for location shooting in Toulon.

Although the original play imagined a setting during the First World War, it was updated to 1935 for the film, with a non-specific Mediterranean naval adversary. The screenplay was written by L'Herbier and Charles Spaak. (Note: The play La Veille d'armes by Claude Farrère and Lucien Népoty was originally staged in Paris in 1917 with Harry Baur and Alcover in the cast. It was staged in London in January 1921 in a translation by Michael Morton under the title In the Night Watch. It then provided the basis of three films before the 1935 French production. (1) Veille d'armes (France, 1925) directed by Jacques de Baroncelli, and featuring Maurice Schutz and Jean Bradin. (2) Night Watch (USA, 1928) directed by Alexander Korda, featuring Billie Dove and Paul Lukas. (3) The Woman from Monte Carlo (USA, 1932) directed by Michael Curtiz, featuring Lil Dagover and Walter Huston.)

Location filming began in Toulon in August 1935.

== Reception ==
The film was released in France in December 1935 and was generally well-received by the French press, albeit less for the plausibility of its story than for the quality of the production, with its impressive integration of location and studio scenes and some strong acting performances. Two points received particular notice: that the film was part of a recent revival of standards in French film production after a troubled period; and that it carried a social relevance for the present day in its portrayal of military and patriotic values.

Despite the popular reception of the film, L'Herbier himself remained unhappy with it, partly because he was unable to free it from its theatrical origins, but also because he felt that the preferences of his Russian producer had undermined his own sense of French authenticity in the drama.

Veille d'armes was shown widely around Europe, including Germany, Greece, Czechoslovakia and Italy, and also in the Soviet Union and in Canada. It arrived in London in March 1936 and had a West End run of seven weeks. It was shown in the USA in 1938 under the title Sacrifice d'honneur.

== Awards ==
Annabella won the Volpi Cup for Best Actress at the 1936 Venice Biennale.
