= The Scandal (1934 French film) =

- Directed by: Marcel L'Herbier
- Written by: Henry Bataille (play); Henri Duvernois; Marcel L'Herbier; Ákos Tolnay
- Produced by: Ayres d'Aguiar; Vandor Salkind
- Starring: Gaby Morlay; Henri Rollan; Jean Galland
- Cinematography: Christian Matras; Eugen Schüfftan
- Edited by: René Le Hénaff; Léonide Moguy
- Music by: Léon Guillot de Saix; Michel Michelet
- Production company: Euréka-Film
- Distributed by: Gray-Film
- Release date: 3 February 1934
- Running time: 106 minutes
- Country: France
- Language: French

The Scandal (French: Le Scandale) is a 1934 French romantic drama film directed by Marcel L'Herbier and starring Gaby Morlay, Henri Rollan, and Jean Galland. The film is based on a play written by Henry Bataille, which had previously been turned in a 1923 British silent film of the same title.

The film's sets were designed by the art directors Robert Gys and Pierre Schild.

== Cast ==
- Gaby Morlay as Charlotte Férioul
- Henri Rollanas Maurice Férioul
- Jean Galland as Count Artanezzo
- Mady Berry as Misses Férioul
- Pierre Larquey as Parizot
- Jean Marais as the lift operator
- Milly Mathis as the café keeper
- Mircha as Little Riquet
- Gaby Triquet as Suzanne
- André Nicolle as Jeannetier
- Paulette Burguet as Margaridou

== See also ==
- The Scandal (1923 film)

== Bibliography ==
- Goble, Alan. The Complete Index to Literary Sources in Film. Walter de Gruyter, 1999.
