= L'Inhumaine =

1924 film by Marcel L'Herbier

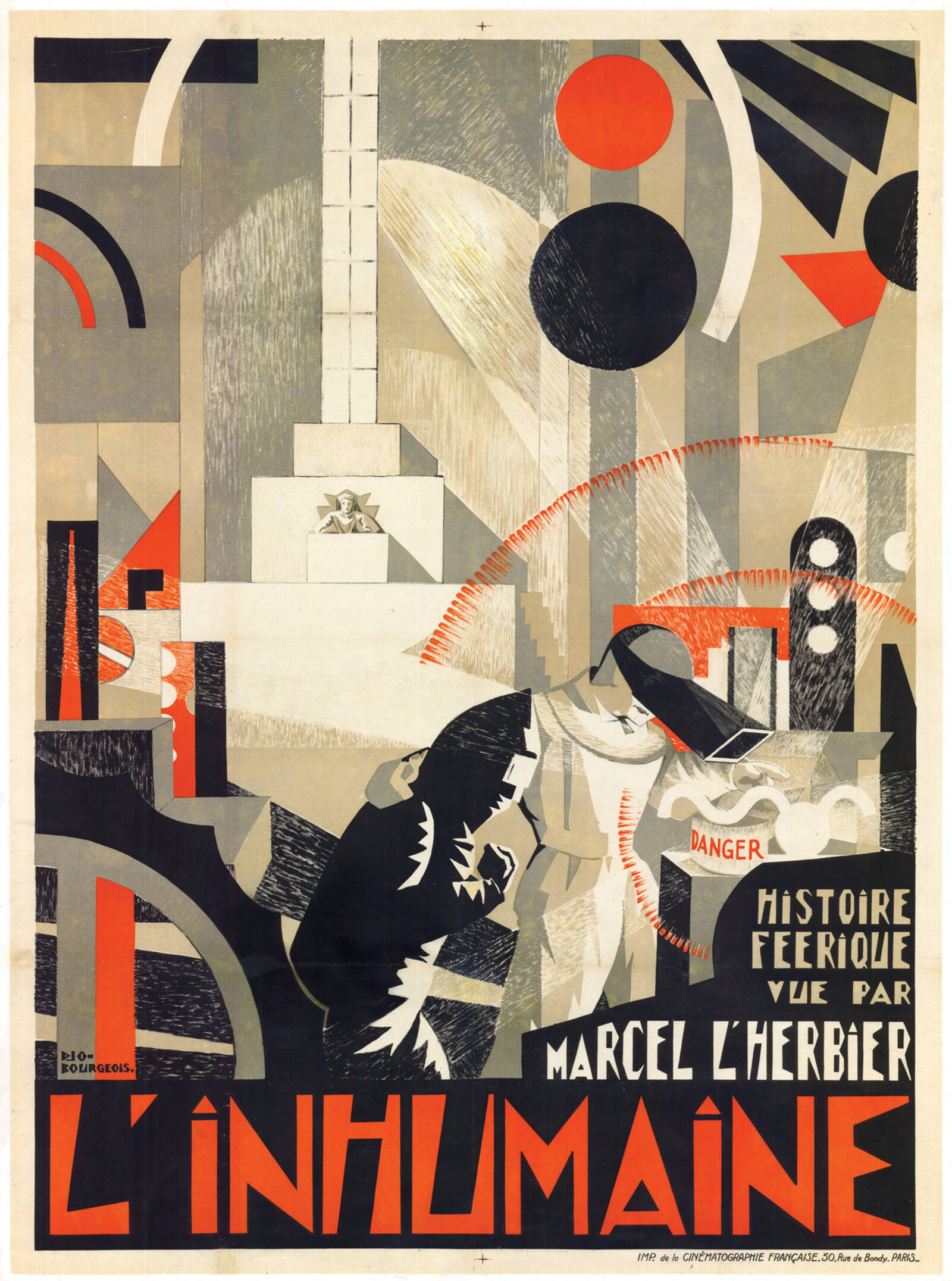
- Poster
- Directed by: Marcel L'Herbier
- Written by: Marcel L'Herbier; Pierre Mac Orlan; Georgette Leblanc
- Produced by: Cinégraphic
- Starring: Georgette Leblanc; Jaque Catelain; Philippe Hériat
- Cinematography: Georges Specht
- Edited by: Marcel L'Herbier
- Music by: Darius Milhaud
- Release date: November 1924
- Running time: 135 minutes
- Country: France
- Languages: Silent film French intertitles

L'Inhumaine ("the inhuman woman") is a 1924 French science fiction drama film directed by Marcel L'Herbier. It has the subtitle histoire féerique ("fairy story", "story of enchantment"). L'Inhumaine is notable for its experimental techniques and for the collaboration of many leading practitioners in the decorative arts, architecture and music. The film caused controversy on its release.

== Background ==
In 1923, while seeking to recover his health after a bout of typhoid, and his fortunes following the collapse of his film adaptation of Résurrection, Marcel L'Herbier received a proposal from his old friend the opera singer Georgette Leblanc to make a film in which she would star and for which she would secure partial funding from American financiers. L'Herbier revived a scenario which he had written under the title La Femme de glace (Woman of Ice); when Leblanc declared this to be too abstract for her liking and for American taste, he enlisted Pierre Mac Orlan to revise it according to Leblanc's suggestions, and in its new form it became L'Inhumaine. The agreement with Leblanc committed her to provide 50% of the costs (envisaged as FF130,000), and she would distribute and promote the film in the United States under the title The New Enchantment. The remainder of the production costs were met by L'Herbier's own production company Cinégraphic.

The plot of the film was a melodrama with strong elements of fantasy, but from the outset L'Herbier's principal interest lay in the style of filming: he wanted to present "a miscellany of modern art" in which many contributors would bring different creative styles into a single aesthetic goal. In this respect L'Herbier was exploring ideas similar to those outlined by the critic and film theorist Ricciotto Canudo who wrote a number of texts about the relationship between cinema and the other arts, proposing that cinema could be seen as "a synthesis of all the arts". L'Herbier also foresaw that his film could provide a prologue or introduction to the major exhibition Exposition des Arts Décoratifs which was due to open in Paris in 1925. With this in mind, L'Herbier invited leading French practitioners in painting, architecture, fashion, dance and music to collaborate with him (see "Production", below). He described the project as "this fairy story of modern decorative art".

== Synopsis ==
L'Inhumaine (1924)

Famous singer Claire Lescot, who lives on the outskirts of Paris, is courted by many men, including a maharajah, Djorah de Nopur, and a young Swedish scientist, Einar Norsen. At her lavish parties she enjoys their amorous attentions but she remains emotionally aloof and heartlessly taunts them. She announces her intention to leave on a trip around the world. When she is told that Norsen has killed himself because of her, she shows no feelings. At her next concert she is booed by an audience outraged at her coldness. She visits the vault in which Norsen's body lies, and as she admits her feelings for him she discovers that he is alive; his death was feigned. Norsen demonstrates one of his inventions which allows Claire to broadcast her singing while observing on a television screen the reaction of audiences around the world. Djorah is jealous of their new relationship and causes Claire to be bitten by a poisonous snake. Her body is brought to Norsen's laboratory, where he, by means of his scientific inventions, restores Claire to life.

== Cast ==
- Georgette Leblanc as Claire Lescot
- Jaque Catelain as Einar Norsen
- Léonid Walter de Malte as Wladimir Kranine
- Fred Kellerman as Frank Mahler
- Philippe Hériat as Djorah de Nopur
- Marcelle Pradot as The simpleton

== Production ==
Filming began in September 1923 at the Joinville studios in Paris and had to be carried on at great speed because Georgette Leblanc was committed to return to America in mid-October for a concert tour. L'Herbier often continued shooting through the night, making intense demands on his cast and crew. In the event, Leblanc had to leave before everything was finished and some scenes could only be completed when she returned to Paris in spring 1924.

The crowd inside the Théâtre des Champs-Élysées

One evening of location shooting became famous (4 October 1923). For the scene of Claire Lescot's concert L'Herbier hired the Théâtre des Champs-Élysées and invited over 2000 people from the film world and fashionable society to attend in evening dress and to play the part of an unruly audience. Ten cameras were deployed around the theatre to record their reactions to the concert. This included the American pianist George Antheil performing some of his own dissonant compositions which created a suitably confrontational mood, and when Georgette Leblanc appeared on stage the audience responded with the required tumult of whistles, applause and protests, as well as some scuffles. The audience is said to have included Erik Satie, Pablo Picasso, Man Ray, Léon Blum, James Joyce, Ezra Pound and the Prince of Monaco.

Sets for Lescot's mansion and Norsen's laboratory

A wide range of practitioners in different fields of the arts worked on the film, meeting L'Herbier's ambition of creating a film which united many forms of artistic expression. Four designers contributed to the sets. The painter Fernand Léger created the mechanical laboratory of Einar Norsen. The architect Robert Mallet-Stevens designed the exteriors of the houses of Norsen and Claire Lescot, with strong cubist elements. Alberto Cavalcanti and Claude Autant-Lara, soon to be directing their own films, both had a background in design; Autant-Lara was responsible for the winter-garden set and the funeral vault, while Cavalcanti designed the geometric dining hall for Claire's party, with its dining-table set on an island in the middle of a pool. Costumes were designed by Paul Poiret, furniture by Pierre Chareau and Michel Dufet, jewellery by Raymond Templier, and other "objets" by René Lalique and Jean Puiforcat. The choreographed scenes were provided by Jean Börlin and the Ballets Suédois. To bind the whole together L'Herbier commissioned the young Darius Milhaud to write a score with extensive use of percussion, to which the images were to be edited. (This musical score which was central to L'Herbier's conception of the film has not survived.) The final sequence of the film, in which Claire is 'resurrected', is an elaborate exercise in rapid cutting, whose expressive possibilities had recently been demonstrated in La Roue. In addition to the juxtaposition and rhythmic repetition of images, L'Herbier interspersed frames of bright colours, intending to create counterpoint to the music of Milhaud and "to make the light sing".

== Reception ==
L'Inhumaine received its first public screenings in November 1924, and its reception with the public and with critics was largely negative. It also became a financial disaster for L'Herbier's production company Cinégraphic. One of the film's stars drew a vivid picture of the impact which it had among Parisian audiences during its run at the Madeleine-Cinéma:

At each screening, spectators insulted each other, and there were as many frenzied partisans of the film as there were furious opponents. It was amid genuine uproar that, at every performance, there passed across the screen the multicoloured and syncopated images with which the film ends. Women, with hats askew, demanded their money back; men, with their faces screwed up, tumbled out on to the pavement where sometimes fist-fights continued.

Criticism was levelled at the old-fashioned scenario and at the inexpressive performances of the principal actors, but the most contentious aspects were the film's visual and technical innovations. According to the critic Léon Moussinac, "There are many inventions, but they count too much for themselves and not enough for the film".

Many film historians and critics have ridiculed L'Inhumaine as a misguided attempt to celebrate film as art or to reconcile the popular and the élitist. On the other hand, it was precisely the originality and daring of L'Herbier's concept which won the enthusiasm of the film's admirers, such as the architect Adolf Loos: "It is a brilliant song on the greatness of modern technique. ...The final images of L'Inhumaine surpass the imagination. As you emerge from seeing it, you have the impression of having lived through the moment of birth of a new art." A modern commentator has echoed this view more concisely in describing the film as "fabulously inventive".

L'Herbier had always wanted the film to provide to the world a showcase for contemporary decorative arts in France (as well as its cinema) and the film was duly presented in a number of cities abroad (New York, Barcelona, Geneva, London, Brussels, Warsaw, Shanghai, Tokyo). It at least succeeded in drawing more measured responses from those audiences. Today the film is often cited as a "manifesto for Art Deco".

== Restorations ==
After its initial release L'Inhumaine was largely forgotten for many years, until a revival in Paris in 1968 attracted interest from new audiences. A restoration of the film was undertaken in 1972. In 1975 it was successfully shown as the opening event in an exhibition commemorating the 50th anniversary of the Exposition des Arts Décoratifs. In 1987 it was screened out of competition at the Cannes Film Festival.

In 2014 a new restoration was undertaken by Lobster Films, scanning the original nitrate negative to produce a 4K digital version (with a running time of 122 minutes). Reconstruction of L'Herbier's scheme of tinting and toning was made by following indications from the original reels, including the brief flashes of pure colour which were interpolated in the sequence of rapid montage in the final scene of the film. The first public performance of this restored version was given at the Théâtre du Châtelet in Paris on 30 March 2015, with a newly composed score by Aidje Tafial. A Blu-ray and DVD edition was published in December 2015; it included the musical accompaniment by Aidje Tafial and an alternative one by the Alloy Orchestra.

On February 22, 2026, the film was screened as a retrospective part of the Dublin International Film Festival. Composer Meg Morley performed the musical accompaniment live on piano. The film was introduced to the public by Rob Byrne, the President of San Francisco Film Preserve.
