= Jaque Catelain =

French actor (1897–1965)

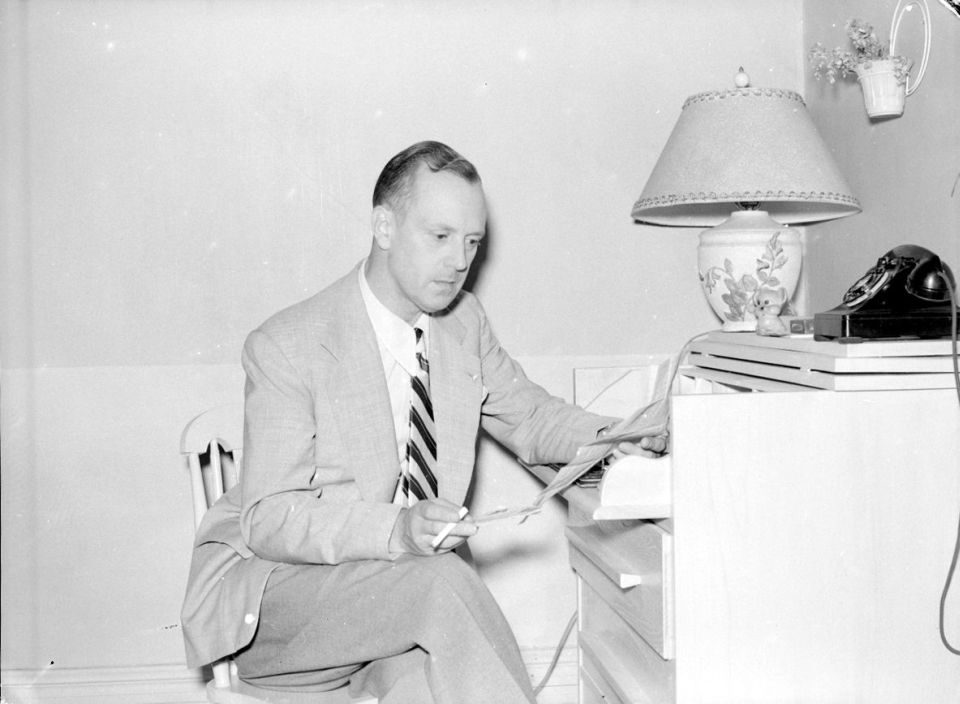
- Born: Jacques Guérin-Castelain; 9 February 1897; Saint-Germain-en-Laye, France
- Died: 5 March 1965 (aged 68); Paris, France

Jaque Catelain (9 February 1897 – 5 March 1965) was a French actor who came to prominence in silent films of the 1920s, and who continued acting in films and on stage until the 1950s. He also wrote and directed two silent films himself, and he was a capable artist and musician. He had a close association with the director Marcel L'Herbier. (He was born as Jacques Guérin-Castelain; other variations of his name used at different times were Jaque-Catelain, Jacques Catelain, Jacques Catelin, and Jacque Cathelain.)

== Early life ==
Jaque Catelain was born in Saint-Germain-en-Laye in the Pavillon Henri IV (he was said to have been born in the same room as Louis XIV). His father was then the mayor of Saint-Germain-en-Laye, and also moved in literary and theatrical circles, which allowed the young Jacques to encounter many famous names in his childhood, including Catulle Mendès, Anatole France, Sarah Bernhardt, and Gabrielle Réjane. He showed early enthusiasm for the arts and music, and at the age of 16 he entered the Académie Julian in Paris to study fine arts. With the outbreak of war in the following year, he changed direction and chose to study acting at the Conservatoire, enrolling in the class of Paul Mounet, before being mobilised into the artillery.

== Career ==
In 1914 Catelain met Marcel L'Herbier, then a writer and critic, who became a major influence on his life and career, and with whom he formed a lifelong friendship. When L'Herbier began directing films in 1917, Catelain became his leading man of choice and starred in twelve of his silent films, starting with Le Torrent. The first major role to attract attention was that of the dissolute son of a Breton fisherman in L'Homme du large (1920). This was followed by El Dorado, Don Juan et Faust, L'Inhumaine, and Le Vertige, and they made Catelain into a leading star who was in demand to appear in foreign films as well as in productions of other French directors such as Léonce Perret (in Kœnigsmark). In 1922 he was working in Munich under contract to a German film company and he returned there in 1925 to appear in Robert Wiene's (silent) production of Der Rosenkavalier. Also in 1925 he was offered a seven-year contract by MGM to work in America, but he turned this down.

Jaque Catelain's activities in this period extended beyond acting. He had already worked as an editor on L'Homme du large, and when Marcel L'Herbier set up his own production company Cinégraphic in 1922, its first project became Le Marchand de plaisirs which Catelain directed as well as acting a double role in it. In the following year he wrote and directed a second film, La Galerie des monstres (1923/24). Both films were successful enough to cover their costs. He devised controversial make-up for some of the actors in L'Inhumaine, and his artistic skills were put to further use in two set designs for L'Argent As a pianist he would sometimes step in to provide improvised accompaniment for previews of L'Herbier's films.

Catelain successfully made the transition from silent to sound films, starring in L'Herbier's L'Enfant de l'amour (1929), but during the 1930s he took fewer leading film roles and started to act in the theatre. In February 1933 Catelain married Suzanne Vial, a friend since childhood who had become a production assistant to L'Herbier in the 1920s and continued working with him until 1944. Soon afterwards in 1933/1934 Catelain was employed by the daily newspaper Le Journal to go to Hollywood to carry out a series of interviews with leading personalities such as Chaplin, Stroheim and Sternberg.

In May 1940, Catelain left France for a four-month theatrical tour of South America, but within a month France was occupied by the Germans and his absence lasted for six years. In Buenos Aires he became so ill with pneumonia that he was given the last rites, but he recovered and went to Canada for the next three years for work in the theatre and propaganda broadcasts. In 1943 he was invited to Hollywood and remained there for a further three years taking bits parts and film dubbing jobs. He returned to Paris in 1946, and resumed an occasional career in films, appearing in minor roles in three of Jean Renoir's films in the 1950s. In 1950, he published a biography and appreciation of the work of Marcel L'Herbier.

Catelain died in Paris in 1965, and he was buried in Passy Cemetery.

== Reputation ==
Jaque Catelain won considerable popularity in the early 1920s through his film roles as romantic lead or jeune premier. His good looks were of a rather bland and pretty kind which did not commend him so much to later audiences, and he was often criticised for wooden and inexpressive performances. Some contemporary critics however, notably Louis Delluc, saw his restrained and economical technique as a significant development away from the exaggerated theatrical acting which was still common in films, and praised the sincerity and natural quality of his performances. Catelain himself was sufficiently thoughtful on the subject of acting to develop his views about the differences between 'interior' and 'exterior' performance in a journal article published in 1925. His own performance in L'Homme du large illustrates his understanding of the importance of movement and posture in relation to the camera frame at a time when a more 'expressionist' style of acting was common.

== Selected filmography ==
Silent films

- Le Torrent (1917)
- Rose-France (1918)
- Le Bercail (1919)
- Le Carnaval des vérités (1920)
- L'Homme du large (1920) (also assistant editor)
- El Dorado (1921)
- Don Juan et Faust (1922)
- Le Marchand de plaisirs (1922) (also directed)
- Kœnigsmark (1923)
- La Galerie des monstres (1924) (also wrote and directed)
- L'Inhumaine (1924)
- Le Prince charmant (Prince Charming) (1925)
- Der Rosenkavalier (1925)
- Le Vertige (1926)
- Paname n'est pas Paris (Apaches of Paris) (1927)
- Le Diable au cœur (1928)
- Nuits de princes (Nights of Princes) (1929)

Sound films

- L'Enfant de l'amour (1930)
- La Rêve (The Dream) (1931)
- Château de rêve (Dream Castle) (1933)
- Le Bonheur (1934)
- La Route impériale (1935)
- La Garçonne (1936)
- La Marseillaise (1938)
- Adrienne Lecouvreur (1938)
- Le Voleur de femmes (The Woman Thief) (1938)
- Entente cordiale (1939)
- La Comédie du bonheur (1940)
- La Révoltée (1948)
- Les Derniers Jours de Pompéi (The Last Days of Pompeii) (1950)
- French Cancan (1954)
- Éléna et les hommes (Paris Does Strange Things) (1956)
- Le Testament du docteur Cordelier (1959)
