= Marius-François Gaillard =

French pianist and composer

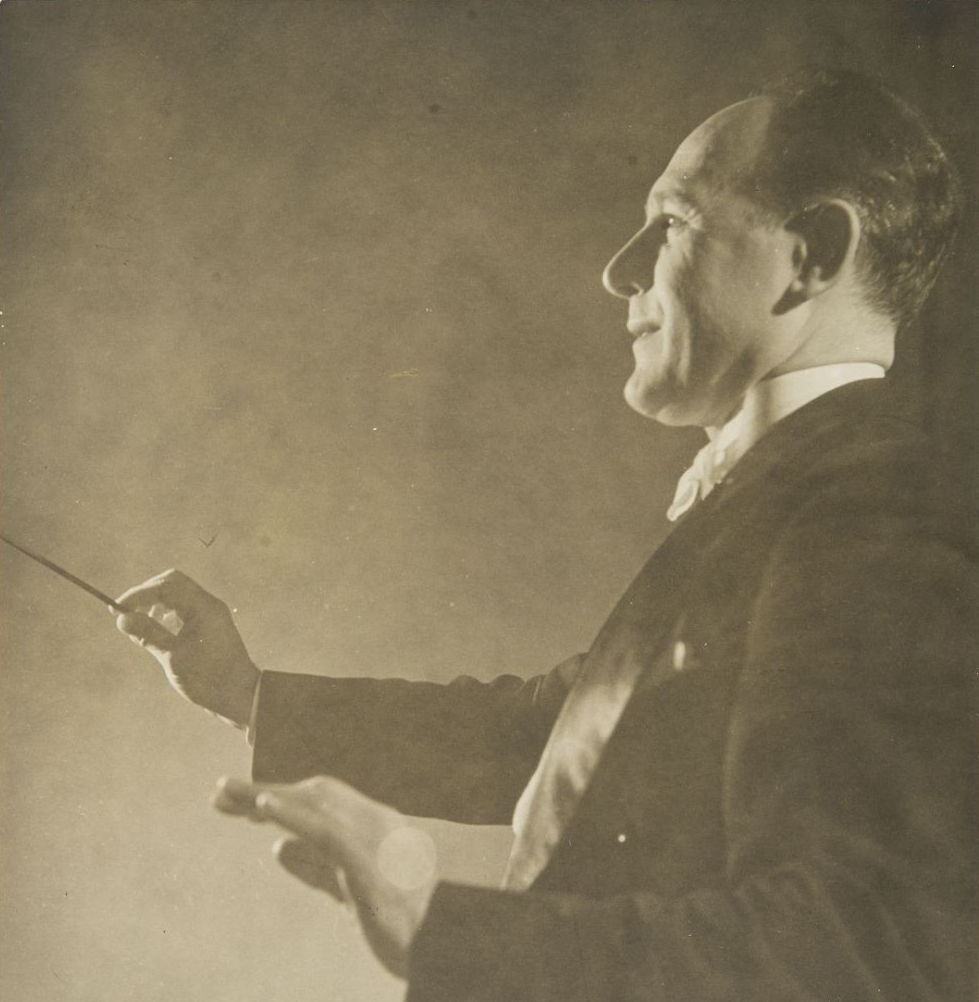

Marius-François Gaillard (13 October 1900 – 20 August 1973) was a French pianist and composer.
