= Feu Mathias Pascal =

1925 film directed by Marcel L'Herbier

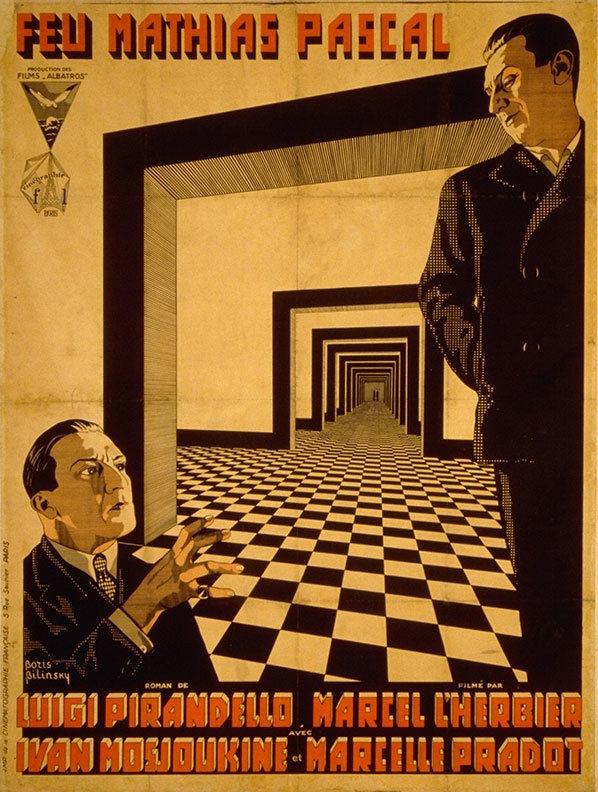
- Directed by: Marcel L'Herbier
- Written by: Marcel L'Herbier; Luigi Pirandello (novel)
- Produced by: Cinégraphic; Films Albatros
- Starring: Ivan Mosjoukine; Marcelle Pradot; Michel Simon
- Distributed by: Films Armor
- Release dates: July 1925 (Paris); February 1926 (France)
- Running time: 171 minutes
- Country: France
- Language: Silent

Feu Mathias Pascal (The late Matthias Pascal) is a 1925 French silent film written and directed by Marcel L'Herbier. It was the first film adaptation of Luigi Pirandello's novel Il fu Mattia Pascal.

== Background ==
Since seeing a Paris production of Pirandello's play Sei personnaggi in cerca d'autore, L'Herbier had been eager to collaborate with the author on a film of one of his works, but hitherto Pirandello had been unwilling to give permission for any adaptations because he would not accept the compromises that were asked of him. When however a proposal was put to him on L'Herbier's behalf to film his novel Il fu Mattia Pascal, he was sufficiently impressed by the film-maker's earlier work to give his enthusiastic agreement.

L'Herbier's ideal choice for the title role was the Russian émigré actor Ivan Mosjoukine who was under contract to the Films Albatros company. Negotiations then led to a shared production agreement for the film between L'Herbier's own company Cinégraphic and Albatros.

== Production ==
Filming began in December 1924 with location shooting in Rome, San Gimignano, and Monte Carlo. Studio filming took place at the Montreuil and Épinay studios. Set designs were produced by Alberto Cavalcanti and Lazare Meerson (in his first assignment).

L'Herbier was delighted with the dynamic performance of Mosjoukine in the leading role, as well as by the rest of his cast, among whom Pierre Batcheff and Michel Simon were both making their film débuts.

== Plot ==
Feu Mathias Pascal (1925)

After the financial ruin of his family, Mathias works in the library of the village of Miragno. He marries Romilde, whom he had previously been courting on behalf of his timid friend Pomino, and they live with his shrewish mother-in-law. When his mother and baby daughter die on the same day, Mathias in despair runs away to Monte Carlo. In the casino he soon wins 500,000 francs. On his way home he reads in a newspaper that he is believed to have committed suicide and another body has been identified as his. He decides to seize this chance of freedom and to start a new life in Rome. There, under the name of Adrien, he falls in love with his landlord's daughter, Adrienne, who is engaged to an archaeologist, Térence Papiano. At a séance, Papiano and his brother Scipion steal Adrien's money. Unable to go to the police, Adrien/Mathias resigns himself to returning to Miragno. He discovers that Romilde has remarried, to Pomino, and they have a new child. He decides to leave them in peace, and sets off again for Rome and Adrienne.

== Cast ==
- Ivan Mosjoukine as Mathias Pascal
- Marcelle Pradot as Romilde
- Lois Moran as Adrienne Paléari
- Marthe Mellot as Madame Pascal
- Michel Simon as Jérôme Pomino
- Jean Hervé as Terence Papiano
- Pierre Batcheff as Scipion Papiano

== Reception ==
The film received its first screening in Paris in July 1925. Because of its length, it had to be shown in two parts, which L'Herbier felt was damaging to its impact. Nevertheless, it was mostly well received by both critics and public, and overall it represented the best contemporary success that L'Herbier had with any of his films. It also received distribution abroad (rare for a French film of the period).

The receipts of the film were valued at 1,219,026 francs; around two-thirds of this amount was earned outside France.

== Alternative titles ==
English versions of the title have included: The Late Matthias Pascal; The Late Matthew Pascal; The Late Mathew Pascal; The Late Mattia Pascal; and in the United States, The Living Dead Man.
