= Marcel L'Herbier =

French film director (1888–1979)

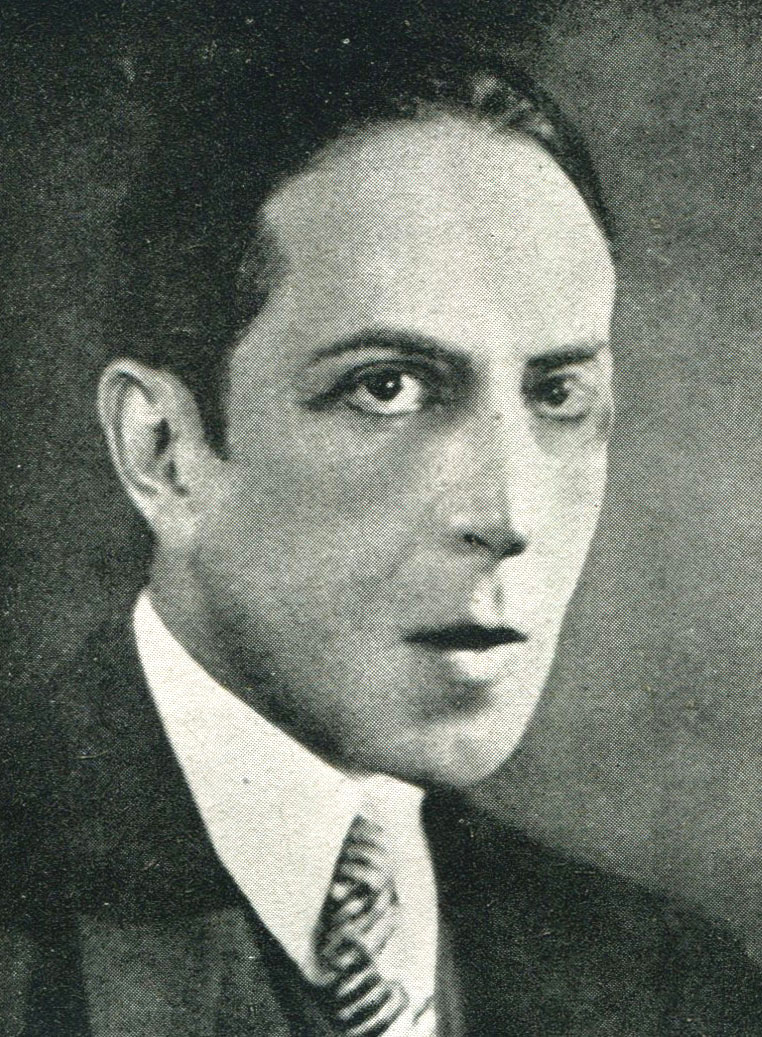
- L'Herbier in 1923
- Born: 23 April 1888; Paris, France
- Died: 26 November 1979 (aged 91); Paris, France
- Occupation: Film director
- Spouse: Marcelle Pradot
- Awards: Légion d'honneur

Marcel L'Herbier (French: [lɛʁbje]; 23 April 1888 – 26 November 1979) was a French filmmaker who achieved prominence as an avant-garde theorist and imaginative practitioner with a series of silent films in the 1920s. His career as a director continued until the 1950s and he made more than 40 feature films in total. During the 1950s and 1960s, he worked on cultural programmes for French television. He also fulfilled many administrative roles in the French film industry, and he was the founder and the first President of the French film school Institut des hautes études cinématographiques (IDHEC).

== Early life ==
Marcel L'Herbier was born in Paris on 23 April 1888 into a professional and intellectual family, and as he grew up he demonstrated a multi-talented disposition for sports, dancing, debating and the arts. He attended a Marist school and then the Lycée Voltaire, followed by the École des Hautes Études Sociales in Paris. He worked hard at his education and by 1910 he had obtained his licence en droit, a qualification to practice law. He went on to study literature, and in his spare time he learned harmony and counterpoint with Xavier Leroux, with the ambition of becoming a composer. Another ambition was to join the diplomatic service.

An early romance with the future dancer Marcelle Rahna ended in sensational publicity when she fired a revolver at him and then at herself. Both survived, but L'Herbier lost the use of a finger. In 1912 he met Georgette Leblanc, the companion of Maurice Maeterlinck, and under her influence he started to write plays, poetry and criticism, and made many contacts in literature and the theatre. His idols were Oscar Wilde, Paul Claudel and Claude Debussy.

The outbreak of war in 1914 changed L'Herbier's world. He withdrew from social life, and being unable to join the army immediately because of his injured hand, he went to work in a factory making military uniforms. He went on to serve with various auxiliary units of the armed forces and towards the end of the war in 1917–1918 he was by chance transferred to the Section Cinématographique de l'Armée, where he received his first technical training in film-making. His intellectual conversion to the medium of film had only recently occurred, initially through a friendship with the actress Musidora (he recalled that she took him to Cecil B. DeMille's The Cheat (1915) which awakened him to the artistic possibilities of silent films) and subsequently through encounters with the critics Louis Delluc and Émile Vuillermoz who were developing their own theories of the new art form.

== Silent films ==
While still in the army, L'Herbier wrote two film scenarios for other directors, and then accepted an official commission to make a propaganda film about the image of France, which was funded by Léon Gaumont. He produced Rose-France (1918), a highly original and poetic film using many experimental camera techniques, which proved too fanciful for many but which established his reputation as a talented innovator. After making another more commercial film for Gaumont, Le Bercail (1919), he was offered a two-year contract with the company which gave him the means to choose more ambitious projects. On Le Bercail, he worked for the first time with the actress Marcelle Pradot who subsequently appeared in most of his silent films and whom he married in 1923.

Between 1919 and 1922, L'Herbier made six films for Gaumont, several in their Série Pax, and three of these stood out as major achievements of his period in silent films. He adapted a story by Balzac for L'Homme du large (1920), set and filmed on the Brittany coast. More ambitious was El Dorado (1921), a grand and visually spectacular melodrama filmed on location in Andalusia; it was noted for its visual experiments with dissolves and blurred images ("flous" in French). Tensions between L'Herbier and Gaumont were resolved into the project Don Juan et Faust (1922), also filmed partly in Spain; but when the film went over-budget, L'Herbier was unable to complete it as planned, and the resulting work was appreciated more for its technical mastery than for its intellectual confrontation of two literary archetypes. After this, L'Herbier felt the need to seek his creative independence and he founded his own production company, Cinégraphic, which produced his next six films.

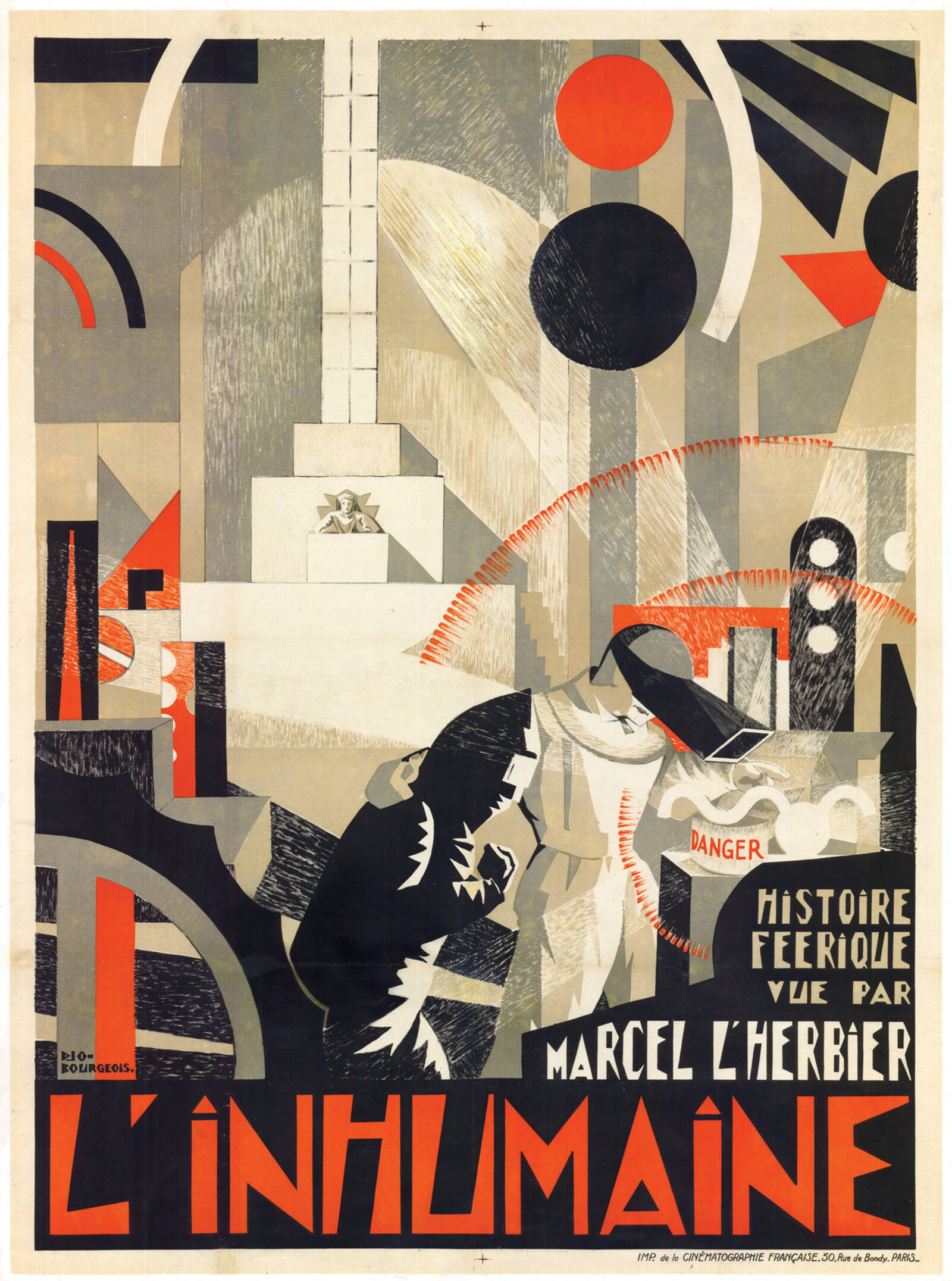
L'Inhumaine (1924)

L'Herbier's first production with his own company was an adaptation of Resurrection (1923) from the Tolstoy novel, but filming met a series of setbacks and the project was abandoned when L'Herbier contracted typhoid and was critically ill for several weeks. Later in 1923, L'Herbier was persuaded by Georgette Leblanc-Maeterlinck to consider a project in which she would star, and which would also attract some American finance; this developed into L'Inhumaine (1924), one of the most ambitious films of L'Herbier's career, in which he collaborated with leading figures from other art forms, including Fernand Léger, Robert Mallet-Stevens and Darius Milhaud. A striking visual spectacle was built around a fanciful plot, and the result proved highly controversial among audiences and critics alike.

Feu Mathias Pascal (1925)

L'Herbier had discovered the work of the playwright and novelist Luigi Pirandello during 1923 and was eager to introduce his ideas to the cinema. He chose the novel Il fu Mattia Pascal, and was delighted when Pirandello's mistrust of filmmakers was overcome and he agreed for the first time to the filming of one of his works,. The film Feu Mathias Pascal (1925) featured the expatriate Russian actor Ivan Mosjoukine in the leading role, and it became successful with critics and the public.

In spite of his successes, Cinégraphic was steadily losing money, and for his next film L'Herbier chose a more popular and straightforward subject, Le Vertige (1926), filmed in the south of France, which was a commercial success. This was followed by Le Diable au cœur (1928), a maritime drama set in the fishing port of Honfleur, and featuring the English actress Betty Balfour; this was the first French feature to be shot on panchromatic film.

The next and final Cinégraphic production (in collaboration with Société des Cinéromans) was another large-scale project, L'Argent (also 1928), an adaptation of Zola's novel of the same name, transposed from the 1860s to the then present day. With an international cast, art deco design, and some spectacular location filming in the Paris Bourse, L'Argent was a substantial work which effectively marked the end of silent film-making for L'Herbier. He had been responsible for some of the period's most innovative developments in his own films, and he also provided support to other filmmakers such as Louis Delluc, whose final film L'Inondation (1923) was financed by Cinégraphic. He also gathered around him a group of regular collaborators, including Claude Autant-Lara, Philippe Hériat, and Jaque Catelain (who became his lifelong friend and appeared in twenty of his films).

== Sound films ==
After a transitional film, Nuits de princes, shot as a silent picture but given a complete soundtrack of music, songs and sound-effects, L'Herbier undertook L'Enfant de l'amour (1929), which, like many other early ventures in sound film, was an adaptation of a stage play. This was the first fully talking picture to be made in a French studio. In addition to the technical problems presented by the heavy new sound cameras, L'Herbier was also required to make the film simultaneously in three different language versions (French, English and German) which meant that several actors had to be used in some of the roles. The film was sufficiently successful to attract other similar offers, but L'Herbier felt the loss of his independence of action, and after making two detective films based on books by Gaston Leroux, Le Mystère de la chambre jaune (1930) and Le Parfum de la dame en noir (1931), he withdrew from film-making for two years and returned to writing. In 1933, fearing that he was losing touch with the film business, he returned to make several more versions of stage plays, L'Épervier, Le Scandale and L'Aventurier, all of which enjoyed commercial popularity but gave little scope for the kind of cinematic invention that he sought.

L'Herbier's most successful film of the 1930s was Le Bonheur (1934), ("a miraculous conjunction of talents"), adapted from a play by Henri Bernstein, with Charles Boyer and Gaby Morlay in the leading roles. During filming, L'Herbier was injured when a camera fell on him, and he consequently lost the sight of one eye. He began a court action against the producers Pathé, claiming their civil responsibility, and the eventual judgment of the case (1938) in his favour recognised for the first time in French law the right of the director to be considered as an author of his film, rather than merely as an employee of the company. This marked an important stage in L'Herbier's lifelong battle for greater recognition of filmmakers as creative artists.

Between 1935 and 1937, L'Herbier directed seven features, including a trio which were characterised by their patriotic spirit, Veille d'armes (1935) (depicting the French navy), Les Hommes nouveaux (1936) (Maréchal Lyautey's pacification of Morocco), and La Porte du large (1936) (the navy again). Made during a period of intense political conflict between the left and the right in France, these films, by L'Herbier's own admission, represented a split in his own politics, which set his socialist sympathies against his impatience with the anti-militarism of the Front Populaire.

After trying to revive his own production company, this time under the name Cinéphonic, to produce some short documentaries, l'Herbier tried to develop more satisfactory material for himself in a series of dramatised histories which he called "chroniques filmées". The three which he completed before the outbreak of World War II were La Tragédie impériale (1938), about Tsar Nicholas II and Rasputin, Adrienne Lecouvreur (1938), filmed at the UFA studios in Berlin, and Entente cordiale (1939), which used the life of Edward VII to demonstrate the affinities between France and Britain; (its première in April 1939 took place in the wake of the German invasion of Czechoslovakia).

The outbreak of war in 1939 did not immediately interrupt L'Herbier's film-making, and in the spring of 1940 he was at the Scalera studios in Rome shooting a long-cherished project, La Comédie du bonheur, but the imminent entry of Italy into the war alongside Germany forced him to return to France before the film was fully completed (though it was subsequently released).

After the German occupation of France in 1940, L'Herbier worked with other filmmakers to salvage the French film industry and to protect the jobs of its technicians. He went on to direct four films before the Liberation, the most successful of which was La Nuit fantastique (1942). This "realistic fairy tale" was very different from the prevailing style of French film production, and it allowed him to return to the style of visual experimentation which had characterised his silent films – to which he could now add innovative uses of the soundtrack. It did much to restore his critical reputation at least temporarily.

In the post-war period, L'Herbier made one further return to the "chronique filmée" with L'Affaire du collier de la reine (1946), but otherwise his remaining films as director were fairly conventional literary adaptations, and his creative career in the cinema concluded with Les Derniers Jours de Pompei (1950) and Le Père de mademoiselle (1953). In the 35 years since his début in 1918, he completed 14 silent and 30 sound feature films.

== Television ==
As his career as a director for the cinema faded in the post-war years, Marcel L'Herbier transferred his energies to the relatively new and undeveloped medium of television. He was interested in what made television distinctively different from cinema, and he wrote articles developing the idea that each medium had its own aesthetic. Whereas for L'Herbier the cinema was a creative art-form, television was a medium for recording, for reproducing, for disseminating to a wide audience; television would not kill the cinema - on the contrary it could be the means of deepening the public's understanding of cinema.

In the years 1952-1969, L'Herbier produced over 200 television broadcasts on cultural subjects, acting as presenter of most of them. Although he devoted some programmes to classical music and historical biography, most of his work explored aspects of the cinema. He presented eight series of programmes which combined critical discussion and interviews about cinema with extracts from films, and sometimes the transmission of a complete film that had been featured in the discussion. He also directed five television plays which were mainly transmitted live. He was the first established filmmaker to work in French television, and he brought to the task an evident seriousness of purpose and concern for its educational possibilities.

== Administration ==
In addition to his creative work, L'Herbier undertook a number of administrative roles in the French film industry. From 1929 he was the secretary general of the Société des auteurs de films which sought to establish greater recognition for the authorial rights of filmmakers. In the mid-1930s L'Herbier supported the view that the national film industry needed stronger and more coordinated organisation if it was to defend itself against foreign competition, and he was instrumental in setting up a union for various categories of film employees, the Syndicat général des artisans de film, soon renamed as the Syndicat des techniciens de la production cinématographique, of which he became the secretary in 1937, and subsequently president in 1939. The union achieved improvements in rates of pay, hours of work, and insurance arrangements for accidents at work, as well as press accreditation for film journalists. The union could also speak with one voice for all aspects of the industry. After the war L'Herbier continued his lobbying for French cinema by chairing the Comité de défense du cinéma français.

During the Occupation, L'Herbier was among those who accepted the reality of the German victory and set about creating the best conditions for the continuity of French life and French cinema. In this role he became almost a spokesman for the Vichy government on matters relating to the cinema, contributing an article on "Cinématographe" to a quasi-official publication on the state of France and its future in 1941.

In March 1941, L'Herbier was elected president of the Cinémathèque française, but his plans for major reorganisation soon brought him into conflict with its secretary and founder Henri Langlois. Langlois found L'Herbier too autocratic and L'Herbier found Langlois too disorganised. L'Herbier continued as president until 1944, when he was finally outmanoeuvred by Langlois, and he was replaced by Jean Grémillon.

L'Herbier's major contribution to the reshaping of the French film industry was the establishment of a French national film school, something which he had been arguing for over many years. In the wartime conditions, he found that there was government support for the project, and in 1943 the Institut des hautes études cinématographiques (IDHEC) was established in Paris. L'Herbier became its first president in 1944 and held the position until 1969. IDHEC offered training for directors and producers, cameramen, sound technicians, editors, art directors and costume designers. It became highly influential, and many prominent filmmakers, including some from outside France, received their training there.

== Writings ==
Throughout his career, Marcel L'Herbier was a prolific author on the subject of the cinema. He wrote over 500 articles for magazines and newspapers, some of which were collected in his book Intelligence du cinématographe (Paris: Correa, 1946). One of the themes that he regularly addressed was the concept of authorship in film-making and the need to establish the rights of film authors over their creative work. Another important topic was the distinctive national character of French cinema and the threat to it posed by the unrestricted import of foreign productions. In 1953 he helped to establish the Cinéma section of the newspaper Le Monde.

Before his film career began, L'Herbier published a volume of poetry: ...au jardin des jeux secrets (Paris: Edward Sansot, 1914); and a play: L'Enfantement du mort: miracle en pourpre noir et or (Paris: Georges Clès, 1917).

In his final year, he published an autobiography, La Tête qui tourne (Paris: Belfond, 1979); [the title translates as "the head that spins/shoots a film"].

Marcel L'Herbier died in Paris on 26 November 1979 at the age of 91.

== Reputation ==
In 1921, only three years after his first film, Marcel L'Herbier was voted by readers of a French film magazine as the best French director. In the following year, the critic Léon Moussinac marked him as one of the filmmakers whose work was most important for the future of cinema. In this period, L'Herbier was linked with filmmakers such as Abel Gance, Germaine Dulac and Louis Delluc as part of a "first avant-garde" in French cinema, the first generation to think spontaneously in animated images.

The acclaim which he earned in the 1920s contrasts markedly with the relative neglect of his later work. Even in the silent period, there were those who found his work mannered and marred by an aestheticism unlinked to the subjects of his films. In the 1930s and 1940s, his public roles and sometimes his political associations were interpreted to his disadvantage by some. However, in France his continued presence in so many aspects of the film industry until the 1960s ensured that he was not forgotten. More recently there have been re-issues and re-evaluations of both his silent and sound films and a growth in critical attention to his work.

In the English-speaking world, in the early 21st century L'Herbier remains a largely unknown figure. Screenings of his films have been rare, as have DVD re-issues, and very little of the critical literature about him has been available in English. Standard film histories, however, confirm the lasting significance of his contributions to silent cinema, particularly in El Dorado, L'Inhumaine, and L'Argent.

== Filmography (as director) ==
- Phantasmes (1918, unfinished)
- Bouclette (Infatuation, 1918; scenario only, and actor)
- Rose-France (1919)
- Le Bercail (1919, uncredited)
- Le Carnaval des vérités (1920)
- L'Homme du large (1920)
- Villa Destin (1920)
- El Dorado (1921)
- Prométhée... banquier (1921)
- Don Juan et Faust (1922)
- Résurrection (1923, unfinished)
- L'Inhumaine (1924)
- Feu Mathias Pascal (1925)
- Le Vertige (1926)
- Le Diable au cœur (Little Devil May Care) (1927)
- L'Argent (1928)
- Nuits de princes (Nights of Princes) (1930)
- L'Enfant de l'amour (1930)
- La Femme d'une nuit (1931; also made in German and Italian versions)
- Le Mystère de la chambre jaune (1930)
- Le Parfum de la dame en noir (1931)
- L'Épervier (1933)
- Le Scandale (The Scandal) (1934)
- L'Aventurier (1934)
- Le Bonheur (1934)
- La Route impériale (1935)
- Veille d'armes (Sacrifice d'honneur) (1935)
- Les Hommes nouveaux (1936)
- La Porte du large (1936)
- Nuits de feu (Nights of Fire) (1937)
- La Citadelle du silence (The Citadel of Silence) (1937)
- Forfaiture (The Cheat) (1937)
- La Tragédie impériale (Rasputin) (1938)
- Adrienne Lecouvreur (1938)
- Terra di fuoco (Terre de feu) (1939, Italy; 1942, France)
- Children's Corner (1939, short)
- La Mode revée (1939, short)
- La Brigade sauvage (1939)
- Entente cordiale (1939)
- La Comédie du bonheur (1942)
- Histoire de rire (Foolish Husbands) (1941)
- La Nuit fantastique (1942)
- L'Honorable Catherine (1943)
- La Vie de bohème (1945)
- Au petit bonheur (1946)
- L'Affaire du collier de la reine (The Queen's Necklace) (1946)
- La Révoltée (1948)
- Les Derniers Jours de Pompéi (The Last Days of Pompeii) (1950)
- Le Père de mademoiselle (The Father of the Girl) (1953)
- Adrienne Mesurat (1953, for TV)
- Ce qu'a vu le vent d'est, ou Zamore (1954, for TV)
- Le Jeu de l'amour et du hasard (1954, for TV)
- Les Fausses Confidences (1955, for TV)
- Le Ciel de lit (1955, for TV)
- Hommage à Debussy (1963, documentary)
- Le Cinéma du diable (1967, documentary)
- La Féérie des fantasmes ou 80 ans de film fantastique français (1975, anthology; for TV)
