= List of French films of 1938 =

A list of films produced in France in 1938:

== A-L ==
Title	Director	Cast	Genre	Notes
Abused Confidence	Henri Decoin	Danielle Darrieux, Charles Vanel, Valentine Tessier	Drama	
Adrienne Lecouvreur	Marcel L'Herbier	Yvonne Printemps, Pierre Fresnay, Junie Astor	Biopic	
Alert in the Mediterranean	Léo Joannon	Pierre Fresnay, Nadine Vogel, Rolf Wanka	Thriller	
Alexis, Gentleman Chauffeur	Max de Vaucorbeil, René Guissart	Suzy Prim, André Luguet, Raymond Cordy	Comedy	
Altitude 3200	Jean Benoît-Lévy, Marie Epstein	Odette Joyeux, Jean-Louis Barrault, Fernand Ledoux	Drama	
The Baker's Wife	Marcel Pagnol	Raimu, Ginette Leclerc, Fernand Charpin	Comedy	2 wins
Barnabé	Alexander Esway	Fernandel, Marguerite Moreno, Paulette Dubost	Comedy	
Beautiful Star	Jacques de Baroncelli	Michel Simon, Meg Lemonnier, Jean-Pierre Aumont	Comedy drama	
Café de Paris	Yves Mirande, Georges Lacombe	Vera Korene, Jules Berry, Simone Berriau	Mystery	
Captain Benoit	Maurice de Canonge	Jean Murat, Mireille Balin, Madeleine Robinson	Thriller	
Champions of France	Willy Rozier	Georgius, Pierre Etchepare, André Fouché	Sports comedy	
Chéri-Bibi	Léon Mathot	Pierre Fresnay, Jean-Pierre Aumont, Marcel Dalio	Drama	
The Chess Player	Jean Dréville	Françoise Rosay, Conrad Veidt, Micheline Francey	Drama	
The City of Lights	Jean de Limur	Madeleine Robinson, Daniel Lecourtois, Pierre Larquey	Drama	
Clodoche	Claude Orval	Pierre Larquey, Denise Bosc, Jules Berry	Comedy	
Conflict	Léonide Moguy	Corinne Luchaire, Annie Ducaux, Claude Dauphin	Drama	
Coral Reefs	Maurice Gleize	Jean Gabin, Michèle Morgan, Pierre Renoir	Adventure	
Crossroads	Curtis Bernhardt	Charles Vanel, Jules Berry, Suzy Prim	Film noir	
The Curtain Rises	Marc Allégret	Louis Jouvet, Claude Dauphin, Odette Joyeux	Crime	
Deuxième bureau contre kommandantur	René Jayet, Robert Bibal	Gabriel Gabrio, Junie Astor, Léon Mathot	Spy	
Durand Jewellers	Jean Stelli	Blanche Montel, Jacques Baumer, Monique Rolland	Comedy	
Education of a Prince	Alexander Esway	Elvire Popesco, Louis Jouvet, Josette Day	Comedy	
Ernest the Rebel	Christian-Jaque	Fernandel, Mona Goya, Robert Le Vigan	Comedy	
Final Accord	Douglas Sirk, Ignacy Rosenkranz	Käthe von Nagy, Jules Berry, George Rigaud	Comedy	Co-production with Switzerland
A Foolish Maiden	Henri Diamant-Berger	Victor Francen, Annie Ducaux, Juliette Faber	Drama	
Four in the Morning	Fernand Rivers	Lucien Baroux, André Lefaur, Lyne Clevers	Comedy	
Gargousse	Henry Wulschleger	Bach, Saturnin Fabre, Jeanne Fusier-Gir	Comedy	
Gibraltar	Fyodor Otsep	Viviane Romance, Roger Duchesne, Erich von Stroheim	Drama	
The Girls of the Rhône	Jean-Paul Paulin	Annie Ducaux, Daniel Lecourtois, Alexandre Rignault	Drama	
Golden Venus	Jean Delannoy, Charles Méré	Jacques Copeau, Mireille Balin, Saturnin Fabre	Adventure	
The Gutter	Maurice Lehmann, Claude Autant-Lara	Françoise Rosay, Michel Simon, Ginette Leclerc	Drama	
Heartbeat	Marcel Pagnol	Fernandel, Orane Demazis, Fernand Charpin	Comedy	
Hercule	Alexander Esway	Fernandel, Gaby Morlay, Pierre Brasseur	Comedy	
Heroes of the Marne	André Hugon	Raimu, Albert Bassermann, Germaine Dermoz	War	
Hôtel du Nord	Marcel Carné	Annabella, Jean-Pierre Aumont, Louis Jouvet	Drama	
The Human Beast	Jean Renoir	Jean Gabin, Simone Simon, Blanchette Brunoy	Drama	1 nomination
I Was an Adventuress	Raymond Bernard	Edwige Feuillère, Jean Murat, Guillaume de Sax	Comedy drama	
If You Return	Jacques Daniel-Norman	Reda Caire, Nicole Vattier, Jean Aquistapace	Comedy	
In the Sun of Marseille	Pierre-Jean Ducis	Henri Garat, Germaine Sablon, Fernand Charpin	Musical	
The Innocent	Maurice Cammage	Noël-Noël, Madeleine Robinson, Henri Nassiet	Comedy drama	
J'accuse!	Abel Gance	Victor Francen, Line Noro, Jean-Max	Drama	
Jeannette Bourgogne	Jean Gourguet	Blanchette Brunoy	Drama	
Katia	Maurice Tourneur	Danielle Darrieux, John Loder, Aimé Clariond	Historical	
The Lafarge Case	Pierre Chenal	Pierre Renoir, Marcelle Chantal, Erich von Stroheim	Historical Crime	
Liberty	Jean Kemm	Maurice Escande, Lucien Gallas, Milly Mathis	Drama	
Lights of Paris	Richard Pottier	Tino Rossi, Michèle Alfa, Raymond Cordy	Musical	
The Little Thing	Maurice Cloche	Robert Lynen, Arletty, Janine Darcey	Drama	

== M-Z ==
Title	Director	Cast	Genre	Notes
La Marseillaise	Jean Renoir	Pierre Renoir, Lise Delamare, Louis Jouvet	Historical	
Mirages	Alexandre Ryder	Arletty, Jeanne Aubert, Michel Simon	Drama	
Mollenard	Robert Siodmak	Harry Baur, Gabrielle Dorziat, Gina Manès	Drama	
Monsieur Breloque Has Disappeared	Robert Péguy	Lucien Baroux, Junie Astor, Suzy Pierson	Comedy	
Monsieur Coccinelle	Dominique Bernard-Deschamps	Pierre Larquey, Jane Loury, Jeanne Provost	Comedy	
The Most Beautiful Girl in the World	Dimitri Kirsanoff	Véra Flory, Georges Rollin, Nadia Sibirskaïa	Comedy	
Mother Love	Jean Boyer	Michel Simon, Arletty, Gabrielle Dorziat	Comedy	
My Priest Among the Rich	Jean Boyer	Bach, Elvire Popesco, André Alerme	Comedy	
The New Rich	André Berthomieu	Raimu, Michel Simon, Betty Stockfeld	Comedy	
Nights of Princes	Vladimir Strizhevsky	Käthe von Nagy, Marina Koshetz, Jean Murat	Drama	Co-production with Germany
The Novel of Werther	Max Ophüls	Pierre Richard-Willm, Annie Vernay, Jean Galland	Historical	
Orage	Marc Allégret	Charles Boyer, Michèle Morgan, Lisette Lanvin	Drama	
Paid Holidays	Maurice Cammage	Frédéric Duvallès, Suzanne Dehelly, Christiane Delyne	Comedy	
The Patriot	Maurice Tourneur	Harry Baur, Pierre Renoir, Suzy Prim	Historical	
Peace on the Rhine	Jean Choux	Françoise Rosay, Dita Parlo, John Loder	Comedy drama	
People Who Travel	Jacques Feyder	Françoise Rosay, André Brulé, Marie Glory	Drama	Co-production with Germany
La Piste du sud	Pierre Billon	Ketti Gallian, Albert Préjean, Pierre Renoir	Adventure	
Port of Shadows	Marcel Carné	Jean Gabin, Michel Simon, Michèle Morgan	Drama	3 wins
The Postmaster's Daughter	Viktor Tourjansky	Harry Baur, Janine Crispin, George Rigaud	Drama	
The President	Fernand Rivers	Elvire Popesco, Henri Garat, André Lefaur	Comedy	
Prince of My Heart	Jacques Daniel-Norman	Reda Caire, Claude May, Colette Darfeuil	Comedy	
Princess Tarakanova	Fyodor Otsep, Mario Soldati	Annie Vernay, Pierre Richard-Willm, Suzy Prim	Historical	Co-production with Italy
Prison sans barreaux	Léonide Moguy	Annie Ducaux, Ginette Leclerc, Ginette Leclerc	Drama	
The Puritan	Jeff Musso	Pierre Fresnay, Viviane Romance, Jean-Louis Barrault	Crime	
Quadrille	Sacha Guitry	Sacha Guitry, Gaby Morlay, Jacqueline Delubac	Comedy	
Rail Pirates	Christian-Jaque	Charles Vanel, Suzy Prim, Erich von Stroheim	Adventure	
Ramuntcho	René Barberis	Louis Jouvet, Madeleine Ozeray, Line Noro	Drama	
Rasputin	Marcel L'Herbier	Harry Baur, Marcelle Chantal, Pierre Richard-Willm	Historical	
The Rebel	Léon Mathot	René Dary, Pierre Renoir, Katia Lova	Drama	
Return at Dawn	Henri Decoin	Danielle Darrieux, Jacques Dumesnil, Pierre Dux	Drama	
The Shanghai Drama	Georg Wilhelm Pabst	Raymond Rouleau, Louis Jouvet, Christl Mardayn	Drama	
Sirocco	Pierre Chenal	Viviane Romance, Louis Jouvet, Pierre Renoir	Drama	
Storm Over Asia	Richard Oswald	Conrad Veidt, Sessue Hayakawa, Madeleine Robinson	Adventure	
The Strange Monsieur Victor	Jean Grémillon	Raimu, Madeleine Renaud, Pierre Blanchar	Drama	Co-production with Germany
Street Without Joy	André Hugon	Dita Parlo, Albert Préjean, Line Noro	Drama	
Tamara	Jean Delannoy, Félix Gandéra	Véra Korène, Victor Francen, Lucas Gridoux	Drama	
The Tamer	Pierre Colombier	Saturnin Fabre, Jean-Pierre Kérien, Monique Rolland	Comedy	
That's Sport	René Pujol	Pierre Larquey, Henri Garat, Suzanne Dehelly	Musical	
Three Artillerymen at the Opera	André Chotin	Pierre Larquey, Roland Toutain, Paul Azaïs	Comedy	
Three Waltzes	Ludwig Berger	Yvonne Printemps, Pierre Fresnay, Henri Guisol	Musical	
The Time of the Cherries	Jean-Paul Le Chanois	Gaston Modot, Georges Spanelly, Jean Dasté	Drama	
The Train for Venice	André Berthomieu	Max Dearly, Victor Boucher, Huguette Duflos	Comedy	
Tricoche and Cacolet	Pierre Colombier	Fernandel, Frédéric Duvallès, Ginette Leclerc	Comedy	
Troubled Heart	Jean Vallée	Huguette Duflos, Max Dearly, Henri Rollan	Drama	
The Two Schemers	Jacques Houssin	Georges Milton, Jules Berry, Josseline Gaël	Comedy	
Ultimatum	Robert Wiene, Robert Siodmak	Dita Parlo, Erich von Stroheim, Abel Jacquin	Drama	
Véréna's Wedding	Jacques Daroy	Jeanne Boitel, Pierre Larquey, Gina Manès	Drama	Co-production with Switzerland
The West	Henri Fescourt	Charles Vanel, Hélène Robert, Jules Berry	Drama	
White Nights in Saint Petersburg	Jean Dréville	Gaby Morlay, Jean Yonnel, Pierre Renoir	Drama	
The Woman from the End of the World	Jean Epstein	Charles Vanel, Jean-Pierre Aumont, Germaine Rouer	Drama	
The Woman Thief	Abel Gance	Jules Berry, Annie Ducaux, Blanchette Brunoy	Drama	
Women's Prison	Roger Richebé	Viviane Romance, Renée Saint-Cyr, Marguerite Deval	Drama	

== See also ==
- 1938 in France
