= The World Will Tremble (1939 film) =

1939 film

- Directed by: Richard Pottier
- Written by: Henri-Georges Clouzot
- Based on: The World Will Tremble by Francis Didelot and Charles Robert-Dumas
- Produced by: Raymond Borderie
- Starring: Claude Dauphin; Madeleine Sologne; Erich von Stroheim
- Cinematography: Robert Lefebvre
- Edited by: Borys Lewin
- Music by: Jean Lenoir; Wal-Berg
- Production company: Compagnie Industrielle et Commerciale Cinématographique
- Distributed by: Les Films Paramount
- Release date: 10 May 1939
- Running time: 108 minutes
- Country: France
- Language: French

The World Will Tremble (French: Le monde tremblera) is a 1939 French science fiction film directed by Richard Pottier and starring Claude Dauphin, Madeleine Sologne and Erich von Stroheim. It was shot at the Saint-Maurice Studios in Paris. The film's sets were designed by the art directors Léon Barsacq and Jean Perrier.

== Cast ==
- Claude Dauphin as Dr. Jean Durand
- Madeleine Sologne as Marie-France Lasserre
- Armand Bernard as Martelet
- Erich von Stroheim as Emil Lasser / Monsieur Frank
- Robert Le Vigan as Le Greffier
- Henri Guisol as Le Docteur
- Mady Berry as Madame Bécu
- Raymond Aimos as Le Voyou en Fuite
- Antoine Balpêtré as le client milliardaire
- Roger Blin as Le Condamné
- Georges Prieur as Un Ingénieur
- Christiane Delyne as La Fille de Madame BécuF
- Julien Carette as Julien Bartaz
- Sonia Bessis as La Midinette
- Roger Duchesne as Gérard Gallois

== Bibliography ==
- Bessy, Maurice & Chirat, Raymond. Histoire du cinéma français: 1935-1939. Pygmalion, 1986.
- Crisp, Colin. Genre, Myth and Convention in the French Cinema, 1929-1939. Indiana University Press, 2002.
- Hayward, Susan. Les Diaboliques (Henri-Georges Clouzot, 1955). University of Illinois Press, 2005.
- Menville, Douglas Alver. A Historical and Critical Survey of the Science Fiction Film. Arno Press, 1975.
- Rège, Philippe. Encyclopedia of French Film Directors, Volume 1. Scarecrow Press, 2009.
