= Suzanne Desprès =

French actress (1875–1951)

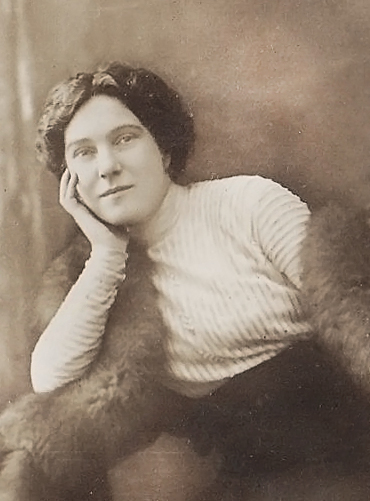
- Detail from a portrait of Desprès on a "Collection Félix Potin" trading card, c. 1908.
- Born: Joséphine-Charlotte Bonvalet; 16 December 1875; Verdun, France
- Died: 1 July 1951 (aged 75); Paris, France
- Education: Paris Conservatoire
- Occupation: Actress
- Organization: Comédie-Française
- Spouse: Aurélien Marie Lugné aka Lugné-Poe

Suzanne Desprès (16 December 1875 – 1 July 1951), born Joséphine-Charlotte Bonvalet, was a French actress on stage and screen. Along with Sarah Bernhardt, she was one of the French actresses who played Hamlet before World War I.

== Early life and education ==
Desprès was born at Verdun, Meuse, the daughter of a mechanic. She worked as a shop girl in her youth. She trained at the Paris Conservatoire, where in 1897 she obtained the first prize for comedy, and the second for tragedy.

== Career ==
Desprès married Lugné-Poe, the actor-manager, who founded a new school of modern drama as the Théâtre de l'Œuvre. She played Hilda in The Master Builder "with vigour and passion" with Lugné-Poe company in 1895, and an "admirable" Nora in A Doll's House in 1904. She played at the Gymnase and at the Porte Saint-Martin, and in 1902 made her debut at the Comédie-Française, appearing in Phèdre and other important parts. She toured Germany in 1907. Édouard Vuillard painted her portrait in 1908.

Desprès was known for a subtle, expressive acting style. "Here is the quiet sort of acting which wins you gradually and keeps you all the more firmly when you are won," commented the Daily Mirror in 1908, on her performance in The Whirlwind (La Rafale), at the Shaftsbury. "Without any screaming or frenzied gestures, but simply by pathetic intonations and the extraordinary expression of suffering which she can put into her face, Mme. Desprès can produce as overwhelming an effect as any actress of the more emphatic school." In 1913, she played Hamlet with "subtle intelligence" at the Théatre Antoine, with her husband playing Polonius, and Jeanne Fusier-Gir as Ophelia.

In 1920, Desprès was described as "one of the greatest French tragediennes" when she was banned from performing in Paris by the theatrical union, because she objected to a union hiring requirement. In 1925, she refused to be decorated with the Legion of Honor, saying "I want to pass by unperceived and continue to work – nothing more."

Her husband died in 1940, and Desprès died in 1951, in Paris, at the age of 75.

== Selected filmography ==
- The Bread Peddler (1923)
- Maria Chapdelaine (1934)
- The Crew (1935)
- Wolves Between Them (1936)
- Boissière (1937)
- The Woman Thief (1938)
- Louise (1939)
- The Pretty Miller Girl (1949)
