= No Women =

1932 film directed by Mario Bonnard

- Directed by: Mario Bonnard
- Written by: Georgius
- Starring: Georgius; Fernandel; Raymond Aimos
- Music by: Henri Poussigue
- Production company: Prima Films
- Distributed by: Prima Films
- Release date: 8 July 1932
- Running time: 80 minutes
- Country: France
- Language: French

No Women (French: Pas de femmes) is a 1932 French comedy film directed by Mario Bonnard and starring Georgius, Fernandel and Raymond Aimos.

== Main cast ==
- Georgius as Lucien Lepur
- Fernandel as Casimir
- Pierre Finaly as Branck
- Jacqueline Jacquet as Micheline
- Raymond Aimos as Albert
- Teddy Dargy as Mme Bectaupieu
- Francine Chevreuse as Cléopâtre
- Edmond Day as Un élève

== Bibliography ==
- Bessy, Maurice & Chirat, Raymond. Histoire du cinéma français: 1929-1934. Pygmalion, 1988.
- Crisp, Colin. Genre, Myth and Convention in the French Cinema, 1929-1939. Indiana University Press, 2002.
- Rège, Philippe. Encyclopedia of French Film Directors, Volume 1. Scarecrow Press, 2009.
