= Wolves Between Them =

1936 film

- Directed by: Léon Mathot
- Written by: Charles Robert-Dumas; Charles Spaak
- Based on: Wolves Between Them by Charles Robert-Dumas
- Produced by: Bob Faure
- Starring: Roger Duchesne; Jules Berry; Renée Saint-Cyr
- Cinematography: René Gaveau; Paul Portier
- Edited by: Jacques Desagneaux
- Music by: Jean Lenoir
- Production company: Compagnie Française Cinématographique
- Distributed by: Compagnie Française de Distribution Cinématographique
- Release date: 3 September 1936
- Running time: 103 minutes
- Country: France
- Language: French

Wolves Between Them (French: Les loups entre eux) is a 1936 French spy thriller film directed by Léon Mathot and starring Roger Duchesne, Jules Berry and Renée Saint-Cyr. The film's sets were designed by the art director Jacques Colombier. It is a sequel to the 1935 film Second Bureau. Two further entries in the series A Man to Kill (1937) and Captain Benoît (1938) were released. The film was remade as the 1939 British release Secret Journey.

== Synopsis ==
A design for a new French gas mask has been stolen from Paris by a German spy. Captain Benoît of the Deuxième Bureau is sent to Nazi-ruled Berlin to try and recover it.

== Cast ==
- Roger Duchesne as Le capitaine Benoît
- Jules Berry as Le commissaire Raucourt
- Renée Saint-Cyr as Nicole Servigne
- Suzanne Desprès as Gertrude Weygelmann
- Pierre Renoir as Gottfried Welter
- Gina Manès as Gina
- Laure Diana as Natacha
- Foun-Sen as La domestique de Benoît
- Jean Debucourt as Le lieutenant von Brenner
- Pierre Finaly as Le juge d'instruction
- Marcel Vallée as Le directeur de la prison
- Arthur Devère as Le garçon du Vaterland
- Pierre Magnier as Le colonel Guéraud
- Bernard Lancret as Max von Raugwitz
- Camille Bert as Weygelmann
- Georges Prieuras Le général von Raugwitz
- Robert Ralphy as L'avocat de Brenner

== Bibliography ==
- Bessy, Maurice & Chirat, Raymond. Histoire du cinéma français: 1935-1939. Pygmalion, 1986.
- Crisp, Colin. Genre, Myth and Convention in the French Cinema, 1929-1939. Indiana University Press, 2002.
- Rège, Philippe. Encyclopedia of French Film Directors, Volume 1. Scarecrow Press, 2009.
