= The Woman I Loved Most =

1942 film

- Directed by: Robert Vernay
- Written by: Yves Mirande
- Produced by: Arys Nissotti; Pierre O'Connell
- Starring: Arletty; Mireille Balin; Lucien Baroux
- Cinematography: Roger Hubert
- Edited by: Jean Feyte
- Music by: Maurice Yvain
- Production company: Regina Films
- Distributed by: Regina Distribution
- Release date: 20 March 1942
- Running time: 90 minutes
- Country: France
- Language: French

The Woman I Loved Most (French: La femme que j'ai le plus aimée) is a 1942 French drama film directed by Robert Vernay and starring Arletty, Mireille Balin and Lucien Baroux. It was shot at the Cité Elgé Studios in Occupied Paris. The film's sets were designed by the art director René Renoux.

== Synopsys ==
A young man with a broken heart intends to commit suicide, and in order to console him, his uncle and friends tell the stories of their own broken hearts.

== Cast ==
- Arletty as Simone, surgeon's tenant
- Mireille Balin as Ferval's wife
- Lucien Baroux as Louis Drotort, artist
- René Lefèvre as Georges, industrialist's son
- André Luguet as lawyer
- Noël-Noël as surgeon
- Raymond Rouleau as Claude Ferval, playwright
- Jean Tissier as Hubert Barnabé, theater director
- Michèle Alfa as Michèle Fabreuse, female sculptor
- Raymond Aimos as gladiator model
- René Bergeron as concierge
- Simone Berriau as artist's wife
- Bernard Blier as funeral director
- Renée Devillers as Jeanne, secretary
- Maurice Escande as Gaëtan
- Charles Granval as industrialist, father of George
- Pierre Magnier as uncle
- Raymond Segard as nephew
- Marcel Vallée as critic
- Alfred Adam as Charles, attorney
- Paul Faivre as Panouille, clerk
- Jacqueline Gauthier as Rose, Simone's maid
- Pierre Jourdan as friend of Claude
- Missia as housekeeper
- Paul Demange as hairdresser
- Geneviève Morel as flower girl

== Bibliography ==
- Bessy, Maurice & Chirat, Raymond. Histoire du cinéma français: encyclopédie des films, 1940–1950. Pygmalion, 1986
- Rège, Philippe. Encyclopedia of French Film Directors, Volume 1. Scarecrow Press, 2009.
