= Lovers and Thieves =

1935 film directed by Raymond Bernard

- Directed by: Raymond Bernard
- Written by: Raymond Bernard; Henri Diamant-Berger
- Based on: Le Costaud des Épinettes by Alfred Athis and Tristan Bernard
- Starring: Arletty; Michel Simon; Pierre Blanchar
- Cinematography: Joseph-Louis Mundwiller; René Ribault
- Edited by: Lucienne Grumberg
- Music by: Jean Lenoir
- Production company: Les Productions Odéon
- Distributed by: Les Films Osso
- Release date: 15 November 1935
- Running time: 90 minutes
- Country: France
- Language: French

Lovers and Thieves (French: Amants et voleurs) is a 1935 French comedy film directed by Raymond Bernard and starring Arletty, Michel Simon and Pierre Blanchar. It is based on the 1910 play Le Costaud des Épinettes by Alfred Athis and Tristan Bernard, which had previously been adapted into a 1923 silent film. It was shot at the Joinville Studios of Pathé-Natan in Paris. The film's sets were designed by the art director Jean Perrier.

== Synopsis ==
Claude Brezin, a man from a respectable family is now down-and-out in Paris. He is put in touch with Doizeau a man, for reasons of his own, wants someone to kill the music hall performer Irma Lurette. Desperate, Brezin takes on the assignment in exchange for twenty thousand francs. However instead of killing Irma he falls in love with her, and the two conspire together to swindle Doizeau out of his fee.

== Cast ==
- Arletty as Agathe
- Michel Simon as Doizeau
- Florelle as Irma Lurette
- Pierre Blanchar as Claude Brezin
- Milly Mathis as La femme de chambre
- Maximilienne as Mme Doizeau
- Jean Wall as Gabriel
- Jean Joffre as Le père Tabac
- Raymond Aimos as Un clochard
- Abel Jacquin as Le baron de Rouget
- Paul Azaïs as Valtier

== Bibliography ==
- Bessy, Maurice & Chirat, Raymond. Histoire du cinéma français: 1935-1939. Pygmalion, 1986.
- Crisp, Colin. French Cinema—A Critical Filmography: Volume 1, 1929-1939. Indiana University Press, 2015.
- Goble, Alan. The Complete Index to Literary Sources in Film. Walter de Gruyter, 1999.
- Rège, Philippe. Encyclopedia of French Film Directors, Volume 1. Scarecrow Press, 2009.
