= Gold in the Street =

- Theatrical poster
- Directed by: Curtis Bernhardt
- Written by: Henry Koster; Henri Decoin (adaptation & dialogue)
- Produced by: Eugène Tucherer
- Starring: Albert Préjean; Danielle Darrieux; Raymond Cordy
- Cinematography: Michel Kelber
- Edited by: Henri Aisner; Trude von Molo
- Music by: Paul Dessau; Jean Lenoir; Georges Van Parys
- Production company: Films Essor
- Distributed by: Les Editions de Venloo
- Release date: 28 December 1934
- Running time: 95 minutes
- Country: France
- Language: French

Gold in the Street (French: L'Or dans la rue pronounced [lɔːʁ dɑ̃ la ʁy]) is a 1934 French comedy film directed by Curtis Bernhardt, written by Henry Koster and Henri Decoin, and starring Danielle Darrieux. The film's sets were designed by the art director Robert Gys.

== Plot ==
Albert bets his friend Pierre he can seduce the first woman that Pierre might pick. The working girl Gaby happens to be the chosen. When Albert gets to know her he falls in love with her. At the same time he attempts to make a fortune by participating in a swindle about alleged "synthetic gold". But at the very day when the scheme ought to be accomplished, everything goes terribly awry and he is debunked. After that he has scarcely enough money left to buy a ticket to the United States for himself and his fiancée Gaby.

== Cast ==
- Albert Préjean as Albert Perret
- Danielle Darrieux as Gaby
- Raymond Cordy as Pierre
- Pierre Larquey as Tourbier
- Jean Worms as De Varville
- Vanda Gréville as Miss Bruce
- Alice Tissot as Mme Tourbier
- Suzy Delair as Madeleine
- Pierre Finaly as Achille
- Gabrielle Fontan as Pierre's mother
- Lucien Callamand as the clerk
- Georges Paulais as the customer
- Robert Dalban as the man at the railway station

== Bibliography ==
- Oscherwitz, Dayna & Higgins, MaryEllen . The A to Z of French Cinema. Scarecrow Press, 2009.
