= Marguerite Pierry =

French actress (1887–1963)

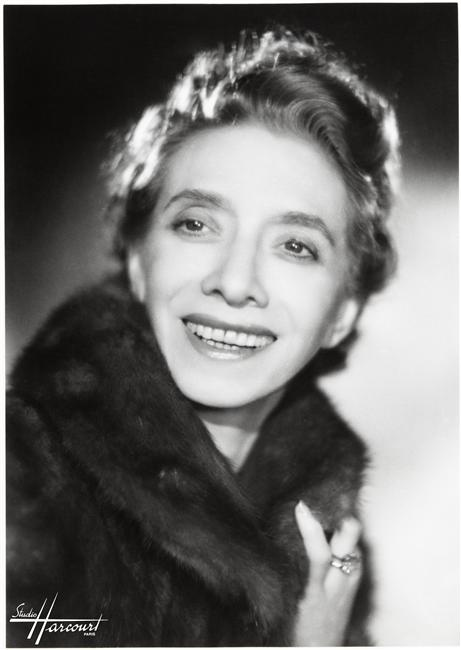
- Born: Marguerite Peter; 26 December 1887; Paris, France
- Died: 20 January 1963 (aged 75); Paris, France
- Occupation: Actor
- Years active: 1931–1960

Marguerite Pierry (26 December 1887, Paris – 20 January 1963, Paris) was a French actress.

== Selected filmography ==
- On purge bébé (1931)
- Adémaï in the Middle Ages (1935)
- Paris Camargue (1935)
- The Two Boys (1936)
- The Citadel of Silence (1937)
- Southern Mail (1937)
- Conflict (1938)
- That's Sport (1938)
- Monsieur Breloque Has Disappeared (1938)
- Prison sans barreaux (1938)
- Monsieur Brotonneau (1939)
- Whirlwind of Paris (1939)
- The Mayor's Dilemma (1939)
- Miquette (1940)
- Paris-New York (1940)
- False Alarm (1940)
- Facing Destiny (1940)
- Miss Bonaparte (1942)
- The Lost Woman (1942)
- The Phantom Baron (1943)
- My Last Mistress (1943)
- Box of Dreams (1945)
- The Husbands of Leontine (1947)
- Last Chance Castle (1947)
- Counter Investigation (1947)
- Convicted (1948)
- The Ladies in the Green Hats (1949)
- Two Doves (1949)
- Dr. Knock (1951)
- Adele's Gift (1951)
- Adhémar (1951)
- Monsieur Octave (1951)
- Madame du Barry (1954)
- Napoleon (1955)
- Nana (1955)
- The Ostrich Has Two Eggs (1957)
- Les frangines (1960)

== Bibliography ==
- Hayward, Susan. Simone Signoret: The Star as Cultural Sign. Continuum, 2004.
