= Jules Berry =

French actor

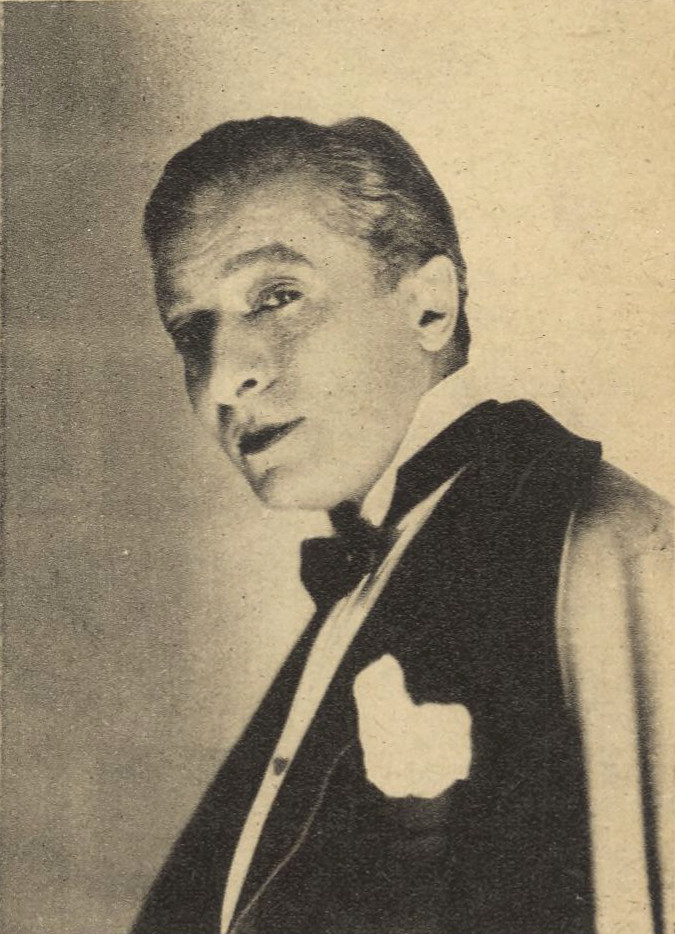
- Berry in 1925
- Born: Marie Louis Jules Paufichet; 9 February 1883; Poitiers, Vienne, France
- Died: 23 April 1951 (aged 68); Paris, France
- Occupations: Actor, director
- Years active: 1883–1951

Jules Berry (French pronunciation: [ʒyl bɛʁi]; born Marie Louis Jules Paufichet; 9 February 1883 – 23 April 1951) was a French actor.

== Biography ==
=== Early life ===
Berry and his two brothers were born to parents who sold hardware and settled in Poitou. The family moved to Paris in 1888. Berry completed his studies at the Lycée Louis-le-Grand and then graduated from École nationale supérieure des Beaux-Arts.

=== Career ===
It was during his studies that Berry developed an interest in the theater. Following an audition, he was hired by the Théâtre Antoine-Simone Berriau to act in La Mort du duc d'Enghien by Léon Hennique, and Le Perroquet vert by Arthur Schnitzler.

Later he performed at the Théâtre de l'Ambigu-Comique and the Théâtre de l'Athénée. During a tour in Lyon, he was noticed by Jean-François Ponson, who hired him for a period of 12 years at the Théâtre royal des Galeries Saint-Hubert in Brussels. Audiences in Brussels gave him a warm welcome, where he played in productions such as Le Mariage de mademoiselle Beulemans.

Berry subsequently performed in 30 successful plays for Marcel Achard, Alfred Savoir, Louis Verneuil, and Roger Ferdinand. One of Berry's first movie roles was the silent film Oliver Cromwell (1911) directed by Henri Desfontaines. His first appearance in a talking picture was Mon coeur et ses millions (1931) with Suzy Prim. Over the course of his career, Berry acted in 89 motion pictures.

Berry was a flamboyant entertainer of the period, including Pierre Brasseur. Berry is often considered one of the greatest actors in French cinema.

Among Berry's best films are: The Crime of Monsieur Lange by Jean Renoir, Les Visiteurs du Soir by Marcel Carné, Le Jour Se Lève by Marcel Carné, Strange Inheritance by Louis Daquin, Baccara by Yves Mirande, 27 Rue de la Paix by Richard Pottier and L'Habit vert by Roger Richebé.

Berry ended his film career in 1951 to interpret the texts of Jacques Prévert.

=== Personal life ===
Berry was romantically involved with actresses Jane Marken, Suzy Prim, and Josseline Gaël. He and Gaël had a daughter named Michelle in 1939.

A compulsive gambler, Berry frequented casinos and horse races. In April 1951, Berry was admitted to the Hôpital Broussais, where he died of a heart attack caused by treatment for rheumatism. He is buried in the Père Lachaise Cemetery (division 80).

== Selected filmography ==
- L'argent (1928)
- King of the Hotel (1932)
- Arlette and Her Fathers (1934)
- The Crime of Monsieur Lange
- 27 Rue de la Paix (1936)
- Monsieur Personne (1936)
- A Hen on a Wall (1936)
- Wolves Between Them (1936)
- Death on the Run (1936)
- The Green Jacket (1937)
- A Picnic on the Grass (1937)
- The Club of Aristocrats (1937)
- The Kings of Sport (1937)
- Balthazar (1937)
- A Man to Kill (1937)
- White Cargo (1937)
- The Two Schemers (1938)
- Final Accord (1938)
- Hercule (Alexander Esway, 1938)
- Café de Paris (1938)
- Crossroads (1938)
- The Woman Thief (1938)
- Clodoche (1938)
- The West (1938)
- The Woman of Monte Carlo (1938)
- Le jour se lève (Marcel Carné, 1939)
- Behind the Facade (1939)
- Case of Conscience (1939)
- Deputy Eusèbe (1939)
- The Duraton Family (1939)
- His Uncle from Normandy (1939)
- The Mondesir Heir (1940)
- Facing Destiny (1940)
- Paris-New York (1940)
- The Devil's Envoys (Les Visiteurs du Soir, Marcel Carné, 1942)
- The Murderer is Afraid at Night (1942)
- Return to Happiness (1942)
- Room 13 (1942)
- Sad Loves (1943)
- Marie-Martine (1943)
- The White Truck (1943)
- After the Storm (1943)
- The Midnight Sun (1943)
- Strange Inheritance (1943)
- I'll Always Love You (1943)
- Behold Beatrice (1944)
- Death No Longer Awaits (1944)
- Dorothy Looks for Love (1945)
- The Murderer is Not Guilty (1946)
- Messieurs Ludovic (1946)
- Star Without Light (1946)
- Monsieur Grégoire Escapes (1946)
- The Crowned Fish Tavern (1947)
- Blonde (1950)
- Without Trumpet or Drum (1950)
