= Once Upon a Time (1933 film) =

1933 film

- Directed by: Léonce Perret
- Written by: Francis de Croisset (play)
- Produced by: Bernard Natan; Emile Natan
- Starring: Gaby Morlay; André Luguet; Andrée Ducret
- Cinematography: Victor Arménise
- Music by: Marcel Delannoy; Maurice Thiriet
- Production company: Pathé-Natan
- Distributed by: Pathé Consortium Cinéma
- Release date: 6 October 1933
- Country: France
- Language: French

Once Upon a Time (French: Il était une fois) is a 1933 French drama film directed by Léonce Perret and starring Gaby Morlay, André Luguet and Andrée Ducret.

It was shot at the Joinville Studios in Paris. The film's sets were designed by the art director Guy de Gastyne.

According to Perret's biographer, critics found that the film, based on a play by Francis de Croisset, "bordered on the conflict between theatre technicians and film studio technicians".

== Cast ==
- Gaby Morlay as Ellen et Mary
- André Luguet as Patrick O'Leary
- Andrée Ducret as Lady Baconshire
- Jean-Max as Baddington
- Madeleine Geoffroy as Miss Curtis
- Georges Mauloy as Dr Samwood
- André Dubosc as Lord Leftsbury
- Jean Bara as Little Bobby
- Gaston Dubosc as Parker
- André Nicolle as Mister Curtis
- Pierre Darmant as Herbett
- Louis Lorsy as John
- Alex Bernard as Alfred
- Pierre Larquey as Redno

== Production and reception ==
The film features in its cast various actors who reprised the roles they had on stage in the production of the play (Max, Mauloy, Dubosc, Bara) This film adaptation was a lesser success than the play but also than other later screen versions (Molander's and then Cukor's).

== Bibliography ==
- Dayna Oscherwitz & MaryEllen Higgins. The A to Z of French Cinema. Scarecrow Press, 2009.
