= Cyrano de Bergerac (1923 film) =

1925 film directed by Augusto Genina

- Theatrical poster
- Directed by: Augusto Genina
- Written by: Mario Camerini; Brian Hooker
- Based on: Cyrano de Bergerac; 1897 play by Edmond Rostand
- Produced by: Augusto Genina
- Starring: Pierre Magnier
- Cinematography: Ottavio De Matteis
- Distributed by: Unione Cinematografica Italiana
- Release date: 30 November 1923 (Paris)
- Running time: 104 minutes
- Countries: France; Italy
- Language: Silent

Cyrano de Bergerac is a Franco-Italian silent romantic drama film directed by Augusto Genina in 1922 based on the 1897 play of the same name by Edmond Rostand. Genina began filming in 1922, at age 30, with the help of his cousin Mario Camerini, but its release was delayed by the colorization of the film.

== Plot ==
Cyrano de Bergerac (1925)

As described in a film magazine reviews, Cyrano, a Frenchman celebrated as a hero, poet, and soldier, wins fear and respect because of his swordsmanship. Because of his sensitiveness of his huge nose, he keeps himself from society. He believes he is outcast from romance. When he falls in love with a young woman, Roxanne, he courts her by proxy. At last she realizes Cyrano's feelings for her. Before she has an opportunity to talk to him, he dies a death of glory.

== Cast ==
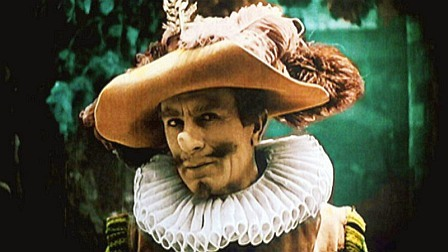
Pierre Magnier as Cyrano de Bergerac

- Pierre Magnier as Cirano di Bergerac (Cyrano de Bergerac)
- Linda Moglia as Roxana (Roxanne)
- Angelo Ferrari as Baron Christian de Neuvillette
- Maurice Schutz as Le Bret (credited as Schutz)
- Alex Bernard as Ragueneau
- Umberto Casilini as Guiche

== Production ==
Nearly the entire film was colored using the Pathé Stencil Color process, which took three years to complete, delaying the film's release until 1925. This involved cutting stencils for each frame of the film, one for each of up to four colors. This was done in Paris by Mme. Marie-Berthe Thuillier, the most famous stencil-color artist, by projecting each frame onto a ground glass screen, and tracing with a Pantograph. These stencils were then used to apply colors to black-and-white prints in a process similar to silk-screening. Each shot was processed separately, so different color palettes could be used for each shot.

== See also ==
- List of early color feature films
