= Alex Bernard =

French actor (1882–1968)

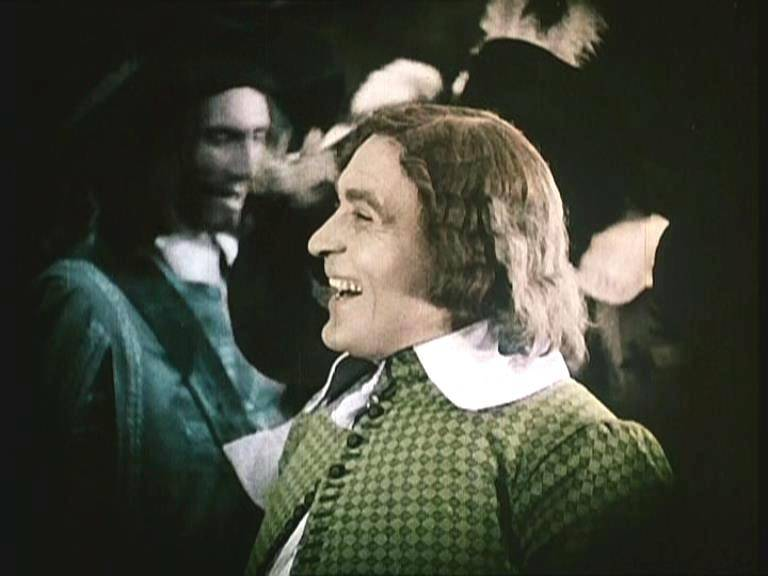
- Alex Bernard
- Born: 11 March 1882; 11th arrondissement of Paris, France
- Died: 20 August 1968 (aged 86); Neuilly-sur-Seine, France
- Occupation: Actor

Alex Bernard (born Albert Alexandre Bernard, March 11, 1882 – August 20, 1968) was a French silent film actor.

== Biography ==
Bernard was born on March 11, 1882 in Paris. He is best known for acting in silent films such as Cabiria, directed by Giovanni Pastrone (1914), and Cyrano de Bergerac directed by Augusto Genina (1925). He also appeared in sound films from the 1930s. He died on August 20, 1968 in Neuilly-sur-Seine.

== Featured filmography ==
- Cabiria
- Cyrano de Bergerac
- The House of Pulcini
- Company and the Crazy
- Miss Europe
- Little Lise
- The Carnival of Venice (1928)
- The Darling of Paris (1931)
- Kameradschaft (1931)
- Once Upon a Time (1933)
- Skylark (1934)
- La Maternelle
