= Pierre Finaly =

French actor (1889–1937)

- Born: Pierre Auguste Finaly; 7 August 1889; Paris, France
- Died: 4 April 1937 (aged 47); Paris, France
- Occupation: Actor
- Years active: 1920–1937 (film)

Pierre Finaly (1889–1937) was a French stage and film actor.

Finaly was born into a family with Hungarian Jewish roots and died in Paris.

== Selected filmography ==
- The Darling of Paris (1931)
- Maurin of the Moors (1932)
- Companion Wanted (1932)
- Billeting Order (1932)
- No Women (1932)
- Heart of Paris (1932)
- Poliche (1934)
- Gold in the Street (1934)
- Jeanne (1934)
- Paris Camargue (1935)
- Antonia (1935)
- The Scandalous Couple (1935)
- Disk 413 (1936)
- The Brighton Twins (1936)
- The Tender Enemy (1936)
- Wolves Between Them (1936)
- Blanchette (1937)
- Culprit (1937)
- The Red Dancer (1937)
- Widow's Island (1937)

== Bibliography ==
- Goble, Alan. The Complete Index to Literary Sources in Film. Walter de Gruyter, 1999.
