= Raymond Aimos =

French actor (1889–1944)

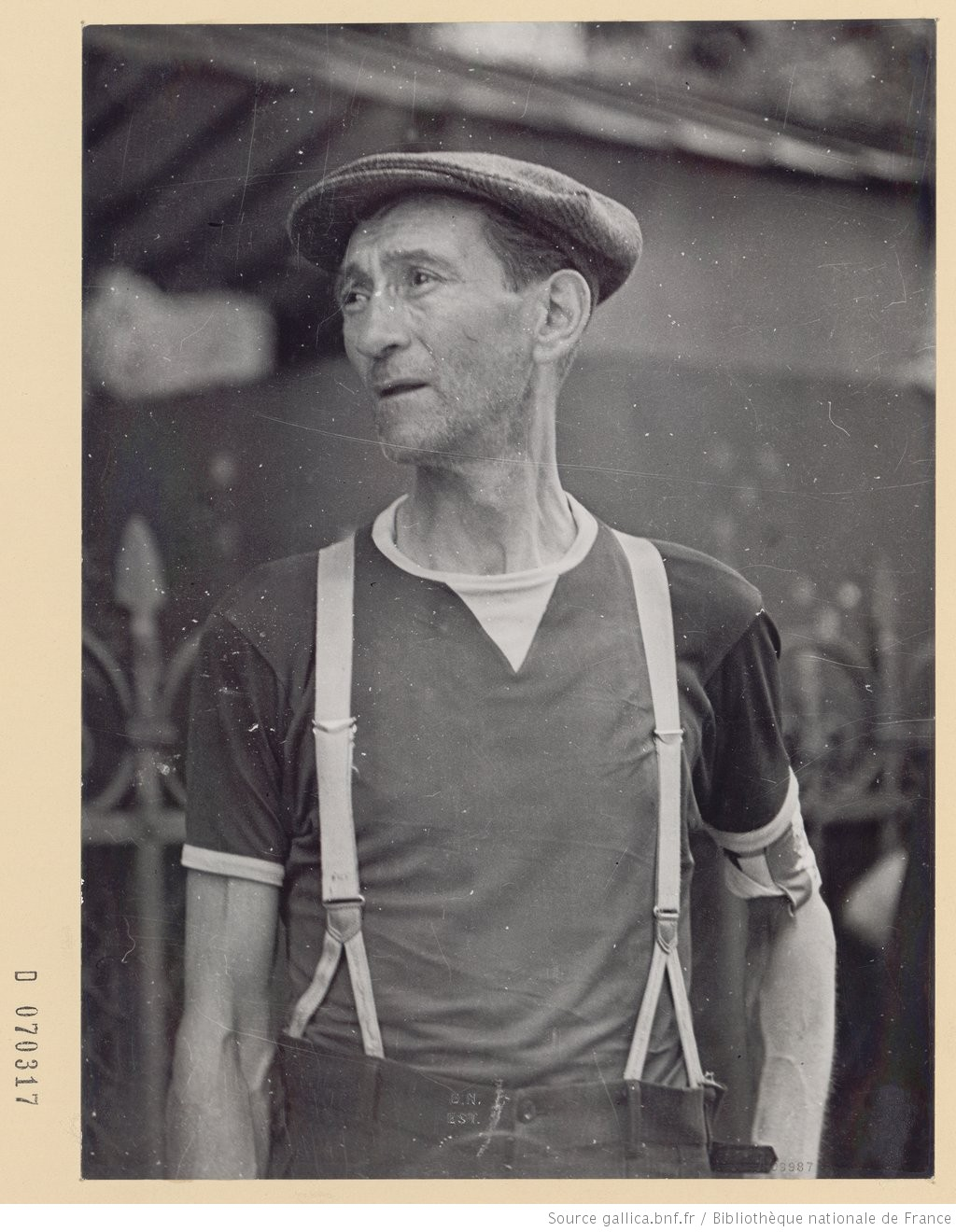
- Raymond Aimos in 1944.
- Born: 4 February 1889; Aisne, Picardy, France
- Died: 22 August 1944 (aged 55); Paris, France
- Other name: Raymond Coudurier
- Occupation: Actor
- Years active: 1910–1944 (film)

Raymond Aimos (4 February 1889 – 20 August 1944) was a French film actor. He was shot and killed as a FFI (Résistance) combatant during the liberation of Paris.

== Early life ==
Born Raymond Arthur Caudrilliers in La Fère, Aisne, he was the son of a jeweller and watchmaker. By the age of 12 he had become an actor, his first role reputedly in a film made by Georges Méliès; he certainly acted in Jean Durand's silent film Pendaison à Jefferson City.

He was mobilised in 1914 and took part in the longest battle of the first World War, the Battle of Verdun between 1916 and 1918. He was four years in the trenches, an experience that he used in Raymond Bernard's anti-war film Les croix de bois (Wooden Crosses).

== Film career ==
When Aimos became a popular actor, he remained modest, never displaying wealth. Marked by the war, he never forget old comrades; for him, true wealth would be found in relationships. Tall and skinny, he played cheeky Parisians in films such as Léon Mathot's Chéri-Bibi with Pierre Fresnay, Marcel Carné's Le Quai des brumes, La Route enchantée, Cupidon, Monsieur La Souris, Le mort ne reçoit and La Belle Équipe directed by Julien Duvivier with Jean Gabin and Charles Vanel.

== War and death ==
During World War II he organised food collection and distribution for the destitute and for prisoners of war. He opened a restaurant on rue Montmartre called "The work of the Gosses d'Aimos" to feed needy children; Charles Trenet sang there in front of an audience invited to put their hands in the pockets to help his work. The exact circumstances of his death are not known, but he was wounded near the Gare du Nord railway station during the liberation of Paris, and was declared dead at the St Louis de Paris Hospital. He had been photographed on the day of his death, 20 August 1944, wearing the armband of the FFI.

== Personal life ==
Aimos was married twice, to Italian artist Rosa Kapuralich-Martinich, and to Madeleine Pauline Botté. After his second divorce he lived on the banks of Marne in Chennevières with his mother and a friend, Renée Lefèvre.

== Selected filmography ==
- Accused, Stand Up! (1930)
- Under the Roofs of Paris (1930)
- Wooden Crosses (1932)
- No Women (1932)
- Aces of the Turf (1932)
- The Regiment's Champion (1932)
- The Star of Valencia (1933)
- Bastille Day (1933)
- Night in May (1934)
- At the End of the World (1934)
- The Last Billionaire (1934)
- Les yeux noirs (1935)
- The Decoy (1935)
- Justin de Marseille (1935)
- Lovers and Thieves (1935)
- The Crew (1935)
- The Terrible Lovers (1936)
- The Great Refrain (1936)
- Under Western Eyes (1936)
- The Mutiny of the Elsinore (1936)
- La belle équipe (1936)
- The Volga Boatman (1936)
- Mayerling (1936)
- The Man of the Hour (1937)
- A Man to Kill (1937)
- Madelon's Daughter (1937)
- Wells in Flames (1937)
- The Lie of Nina Petrovna (1937)
- Southern Mail (1937)
- Storm Over Asia (1938)
- Ultimatum (1938)
- Chéri-Bibi (1938)
- Port of Shadows (1938)
- Final Accord (1938)
- Captain Benoit (1938)
- Sirocco (1938)
- My Priest Among the Rich (1938)
- Alert in the Mediterranean (1938)
- Immediate Call (1939)
- My Aunt the Dictator (1939)
- The World Will Tremble (1939)
- The Spirit of Sidi-Brahim (1939)
- Thérèse Martin (1939)
- Fire in the Straw (1939)
- Nine Bachelors (1939)
- False Alarm (1940)
- Sarajevo (1940)
- The Emigrant (1940)
- Those of the Sky (1941)
- Monsieur La Souris (1942)
- The Woman I Loved Most (1942)
- Summer Light (1943)
- Shot in the Night (1943)
- Death No Longer Awaits (1944)
- Bifur 3 (1945)

== Bibliography ==
- Michelangelo Capua. Anatole Litvak: The Life and Films. McFarland, 2015.
