= The Tender Enemy =

- Directed by: Max Ophüls
- Written by: André-Paul Antoine (novel); Curt Alexander; Max Ophüls
- Produced by: Max Ophüls
- Starring: Simone Berriau; Catherine Fonteney; Laure Diana
- Cinematography: Eugen Schüfftan
- Edited by: Pierre de Hérain
- Music by: Albert Wolff
- Production company: Eden Productions
- Distributed by: Pathé Consortium Cinéma
- Release date: 24 October 1936
- Running time: 69 minutes
- Country: France
- Language: French

The Tender Enemy (French: La Tendre Ennemie) is a 1936 French comedy film directed by Max Ophüls and starring Simone Berriau, Catherine Fonteney and Laure Diana.

The film's sets were designed by the art director Jacques Gotko.

== Cast ==
- Simone Berriau as Annette Dupont, l'ennemie
- Catherine Fonteney as La Mère
- Laure Diana as La Poule
- Jacqueline Daix as Line - la fille de l'ennemie
- Georges Vitray as Dupont
- Lucien Nat as Le Promis
- Pierre Finaly as L'oncle Émile
- Henri Marchand as Extra
- Maurice Devienne as Le Fiancé
- Camille Bert as Docteur Desmoulins

== Bibliography ==
- Williams, Alan L. Republic of Images: A History of French Filmmaking. Harvard University Press, 1992.
