= Laure Diana =

French actress (1897–1980)

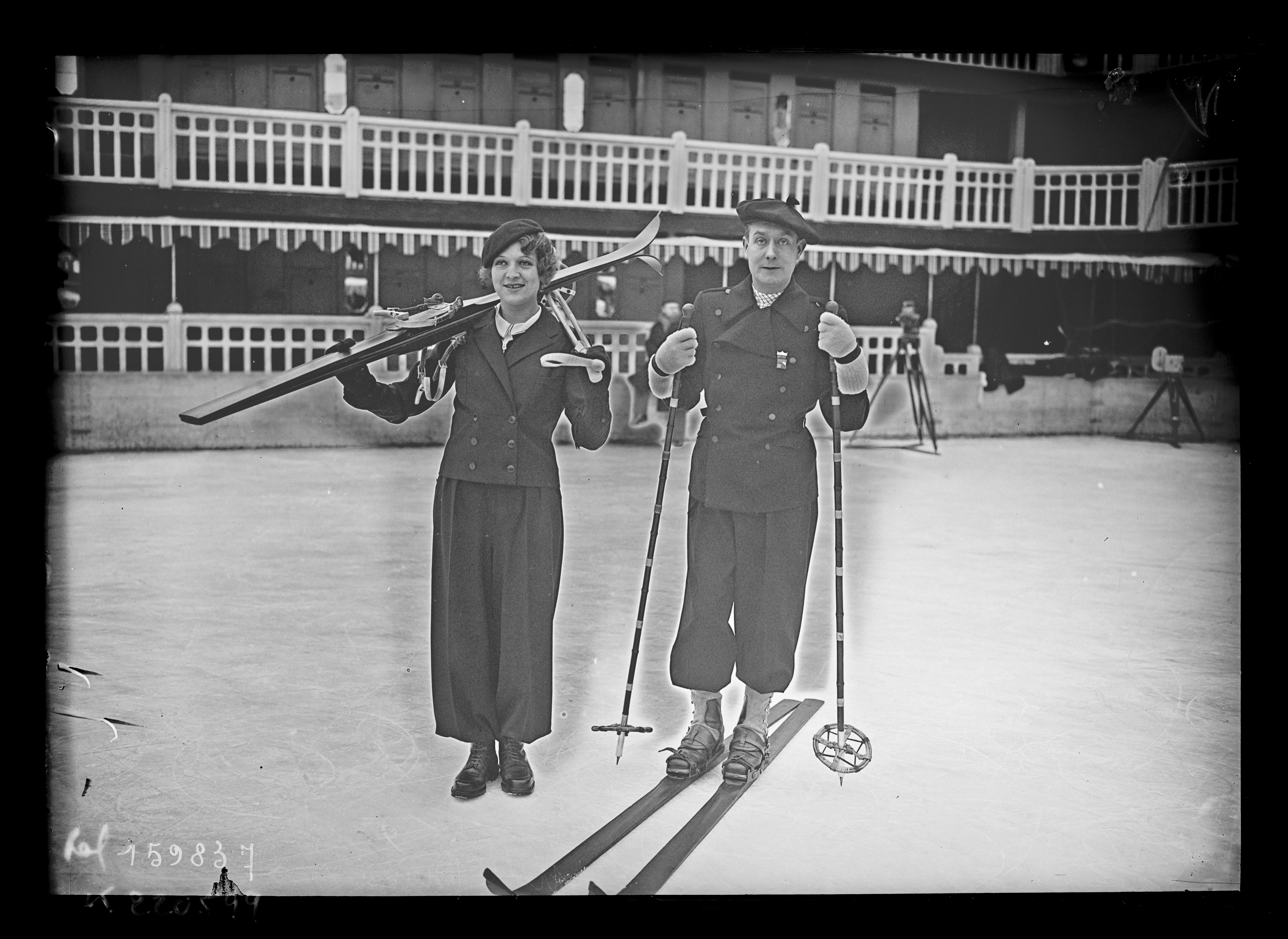
- Mlle Diana and M. André Roanne 1931
- Born: 6 February 1897; Paris, France
- Died: 16 December 1980 (aged 83); Paris, France
- Occupation: Actress
- Years active: 1932-1950 (film)

Laure Diana (1897–1980) was a French film actress.

== Selected filmography ==
- A Dog That Pays Off (1932)
- Samson (1936)
- The Tender Enemy (1936)
- Wolves Between Them (1936)
- A Woman of No Importance (1937)
- Three Waltzes (1938)
- The Beautiful Trip (1947)

== Bibliography ==
- St. Pierre, Paul Matthew. E.A. Dupont and his Contribution to British Film: Varieté, Moulin Rouge, Piccadilly, Atlantic, Two Worlds, Cape Forlorn. Fairleigh Dickinson University Press, 2010.
