= Facing Destiny =

1940 film

- Directed by: Henri Fescourt
- Written by: Jean des Vallières; Alfred Machard
- Based on: Facing Destiny by Charles Robert-Dumas
- Starring: Jules Berry; George Rigaud; Josseline Gaël
- Cinematography: Henri Barreyre; Marcel Villet
- Edited by: Pierre Pierromax
- Music by: Mahieddine Bachtarzi; Jean Lenoir
- Production company: Diffusions Intellectuelles
- Distributed by: Compagnie Cinématographique de France
- Release date: 1 May 1940
- Running time: 84 minutes
- Country: France
- Language: French

Facing Destiny (French: Face au destin) is a 1940 French spy drama film directed by Henri Fescourt and starring Jules Berry, George Rigaud and Josseline Gaël. It is based on the 1938 novel of the same title by Charles Robert-Dumas. The film's sets were designed by the art director Claude Bouxin. It was produced and distributed during the Phoney War period.

== Synopsis ==
Jean Lambert takes some money from a cash register to pay off the debts that his fiancée Madeleine has incurred at the fashion house where she works. He is caught and sent to prison for two years. Feeling herself abandoned by him, Madeleine enters into a loveless marriage with a count who is secretly a German spy. On his release, Jean enlists in the Foreign Legion and encounters Madeleine again in Marrakesh in French Morocco.

== Cast ==
- Jules Berry as Claude Davenay
- George Rigaud as Jean Lambert
- Josseline Gaël as L'amie de Claude
- Gaby Sylvia as Madeleine Clairvoix
- Jean-Max as Franz Hermann
- Jean Aquistapace as Sgt. Sobiesky
- Marguerite Pierry as Madame Clairvoix
- Ginette Choisy as La fille
- Jacques Grétillat as Le chargé d'affaire
- Robert Pizani as Le couturier
- Mittyl Francia as La soeur de Claude
- Paul Escoffier as Le capitaine
- Alexandre Mihalesco as Un officier
- Renée Morin as L'amie de Madeleine
- Rolla Norman as L'avocat
- André Numès Fils as Le copain
- Yvonne Yma as La concierge
- Georges Paulais as Le commissaire du gouvernement
- François Rozet as Le lieutenant
- Henri Échourin as L'inspecteur
- Albert Broquin as Un légionnaire
- Reyna Capello as La secrétaire

== Bibliography ==
- Bessy, Maurice & Chirat, Raymond. Histoire du cinéma français: encyclopédie des films, 1940–1950. Pygmalion, 1986.
- Goble, Alan. The Complete Index to Literary Sources in Film. Walter de Gruyter, 1999.
- Rège, Philippe. Encyclopedia of French Film Directors, Volume 1. Scarecrow Press, 2009.
