= Bernard Zimmer =

French screenwriter

- Born: 30 April 1893; Grandpré, Ardennes, France
- Died: 2 July 1964 (aged 71); Paris, France
- Occupation: Screenwriter
- Spouse: Germaine Schroeder
- Children: 2, including Pierre Zimmer

Bernard Zimmer (30 April 1893 – 2 July 1964) was a French screenwriter who worked on over thirty films between 1932 and 1956.

== Selected filmography ==
- The Battle (1934)
- Liliom (1934)
- Cease Firing (1934)
- Carnival in Flanders (1935)
- Second Bureau (1935)
- In the Service of the Tsar (1936)
- Life Dances On (1937)
- Marthe Richard (1937)
- Captain Benoit (1938)
- Travelling People (1938)
- The Chess Player (1938)
- Night in December (1941)
- Colonel Pontcarral (1942)
- The Snow on the Footsteps (1942)
- Secrets (1943)
- The Materassi Sisters (1944)
- The Captain (1946)
- Thirst of Men (1950)
- Judgement of God (1952)
- Marie Antoinette Queen of France (1956)

== Bibliography ==
- Low, Rachael. History of the British Film: Filmmaking in 1930s Britain. George Allen & Unwin, 1985.
