= The Beautiful Trip =

1947 film

- Directed by: Louis Cuny
- Written by: Maurice Clavel; Louis Cuny
- Starring: Renée Saint-Cyr; Pierre Richard-Willm; André Valmy
- Cinematography: Christian Matras
- Edited by: Maurice Serein
- Music by: Louis Gasté
- Production company: Gaumont
- Distributed by: Gaumont Distribution
- Release date: 26 June 1947
- Running time: 92 minutes
- Country: France
- Language: French

The Beautiful Trip (French: Le beau voyage) is a 1947 French drama film directed by Louis Cuny and starring Renée Saint-Cyr, Pierre Richard-Willm and André Valmy. The film's sets were designed by the art director Lucien Carré.

== Synopsis ==
A renowned pianist and a young woman who has scraped a living as a waitress in the port of Antwerp, meet aboard a ship and fall in love. Despite her difficult past and a former lover they decide to start a new life together in Brazil.

== Cast ==
- Renée Saint-Cyr as Lena
- Pierre Richard-Willm as Richard Lehmann
- André Valmy as Yvon
- Pierre Bertin as Le passager au monocle
- Jean Wall as Wallace
- Laure Diana as Une passagère
- René Génin as Le patron du magasin de lingerie
- Marcel Carpentier as Le banquier
- Jane Marken as La femme d'Albert
- Paul Ollivier as Albert
- Marcel Pérès as Le patron du 'Café du port'
- Ginette Baudin as La femme du banquier
- Paul Delauzac as Le commandant Bernard
- Odette Barencey as La vieille femme au restaurant
- Edmond Beauchamp as Le marin solitaire sur la plage
- Bernard Charlan as Le bibliothécaire
- Daniel Ivernel as Yvon
- Jacques Marin as Un voyou

== Bibliography ==
- Dayna Oscherwitz & MaryEllen Higgins. The A to Z of French Cinema. Scarecrow Press, 2009.
