= Southern Mail (film) =

1937 film

- Directed by: Pierre Billon
- Written by: Antoine de Saint-Exupéry (novel); Jan Lustig; Pierre Billon; Robert Bresson
- Produced by: André Aron; Edouard Corniglion-Molinier
- Starring: Pierre Richard-Willm; Jany Holt; Raymond Aimos
- Cinematography: Robert Lefebvre
- Edited by: Henri Taverna
- Music by: Jacques Ibert; Maurice Thiriet
- Production company: Pan-Ciné
- Distributed by: Pathé Consortium Cinéma
- Release date: 22 January 1937
- Running time: 91 minutes
- Country: France
- Language: French

Southern Mail or Southern Carrier (French: Courrier sud) is a 1937 French action film directed by Pierre Billon and starring Pierre Richard-Willm, Jany Holt and Raymond Aimos. It is adapted from the 1929 novel of the same name by Antoine de Saint-Exupéry.

The film's sets were designed by the art directors André Barsacq and Léon Barsacq.

== Cast ==
- Pierre Richard-Willm as Jacques Bernis
- Jany Holt as Geneviève
- Raymond Aimos as Le Sergent
- Alexandre Rignault as Hubert
- Roger Legris as Le Radio
- Pierre Sergeol as Le Chef d'aéroport de Juby
- René Bergeron as Le Chef d'aéroport de Casablanca
- Abel Jacquin as Le Capitaine
- Jean Aymé as Le Joailler
- Henri Crémieux as Le secrétaire
- Madeleine Milhaud as La Patronne de la Pension
- Odette Talazac as Aubergiste
- Louis Baron fils as Le Père
- Jacques Baumer as Le Procureur
- Pauline Carton as Mathilde
- Gabrielle Dorziat as La Mère
- Marguerite Pierry as Sophie
- Charles Vanel as Herlin, Ambassadeur

== Bibliography ==
- Goble, Alan. The Complete Index to Literary Sources in Film. Walter de Gruyter, 1999.
