= Champions of France =

1938 film

- Directed by: Willy Rozier
- Written by: Roger Dubourdieu; Willy Rozier
- Produced by: Willy Rozier
- Starring: Georgius; Pierre Etchepare; André Fouché
- Cinematography: Marc Bujard; Tahar Hanache
- Music by: Jean Yatove
- Production company: Sport-Films
- Distributed by: Sprint-Film
- Release date: 21 December 1938
- Running time: 77 minutes
- Country: France
- Language: French

Champions of France (French: Champions de France) is a 1938 French sports comedy film directed by Willy Rozier and starring Georgius, Pierre Etchepare and André Fouché.

== Synopsis ==
A wealthy industrialist backs a rowing club on the River Marne. The team soon enjoys success but its prospects are threatened by division in the team driven by an attractive woman.

== Cast ==
- Georgius as Daniel Pinoche
- Pierre Etchepare as Achille Bernard
- André Fouché as Bob Bernard
- Maurice Maillot as Jacques Allier
- Camille Bert as Drick - l'entraîneur
- Myno Burney as Gladys Lodje
- Ginette Darcy as Claudie
- Milly Mathis as Céleste
- Georges Cahuzac as Le père Goujon
- Nino Constantini as Jimmy
- Jacques Henley as Chartrier
- Roger Bontemps as Le bookmaker
- André Claveau as Le chanteur

== Bibliography ==
- Bessy, Maurice & Chirat, Raymond. Histoire du cinéma français: encyclopédie des films, Volume 2. Pygmalion, 1986.
- Crisp, Colin. Genre, Myth and Convention in the French Cinema, 1929-1939. Indiana University Press, 2002.
- Rège, Philippe. Encyclopedia of French Film Directors, Volume 1. Scarecrow Press, 2009.
