= Captain Benoit =

1938 film

- Directed by: Maurice de Canonge
- Written by: Albert Guyot; Charles Robert-Dumas (novel); Bernard Zimmer
- Produced by: Antoine de Rouvre; Jacques Schwob-d'Héricourt
- Starring: Jean Murat; Mireille Balin; Madeleine Robinson
- Cinematography: Raymond Clunie; Marcel Lucien
- Edited by: Yvonne Martin
- Music by: Jean Lenoir
- Production companies: Compagnie Française Cinématographique ociété des Films Vega
- Distributed by: Compagnie Française de Distribution Cinématographique
- Release date: 30 December 1938
- Running time: 95 minutes
- Country: France
- Language: French

Captain Benoit (French: Le capitaine Benoît) is a 1938 French thriller film directed by Maurice de Canonge and starring Jean Murat, Mireille Balin and Madeleine Robinson. The film's sets were designed by the art director Lucien Aguettand. It was the fourth and final entry in a series of films featuring Captain Benoît, a member of the Deuxième Bureau, following Second Bureau, Wolves Between Them and A Man to Kill.

== Synopsis ==
An officer saves the life of a foreign prince who is in France to buy seaplanes, while pursued by his enemies.

== Cast ==
- Jean Murat as Capitaine Benoît
- Mireille Balin as Véra Agatcheff
- Madeleine Robinson as Denise Benoît
- Raymond Aimos as Vic, le policier
- Jean Mercanton as Le prince Joachim / Jean-Jacques de Landelle
- Jean Témerson as Tripoff, le touriste
- Jean Brochard as Mercadier
- Jean Daurand as Griffon
- Hugues de Bagratide as Le sultan
- Marguerite de Morlaye
- Nilda Duplessy
- Jean Heuzé as Un officier
- Philippe Janvier as Un officier
- Armand Larcher as Le préfet
- Pierre Magnier as Le colonel
- Jacques Mattler as Un conjuré
- Marthe Mellot as La grand-mère
- Alexandre Mihalesco as Adhémar
- Micheline Rolla]
- Georges Serrano

== Bibliography ==
- Spring, D.W. Propaganda, Politics and Film, 1918–45. Springer, 1982.
