= Jean Lenoir (composer) =

French songwriter

Jean Lenoir pseudonym for Jean Bernard Daniel Neuburger (26 February 1891 – 19 January 1976) was a French songwriter, whose work included chansons and romantic light film songs.

Lenoir was born in Paris. His most famous song, for which he wrote both melody and lyrics, was Parlez-moi d'amour (1930). It was composed for the cabaret Chez les Borgia and was recorded by Lucienne Boyer. An instrumental version of the song is playing in the background, in the 1942 movie Casablanca, in the scene where Ilsa and Victor first enter Rick's Cafe. By 1970, it had already been performed by more than 167 artists, including: Duke Ellington, Ray Charles, Maurice Chevalier, Ray Conniff and Barbra Streisand.

Lenoir died in Suresnes, aged 84.

== Selected filmography ==
- Paris by Night (1930)
- Alone (1931)
- My Aunt from Honfleur (1931)
- Moonlight (1932)
- The Three Musketeers (1932)
- The Crisis is Over (1934)
- Cease Firing (1934)
- Miquette (1934)
- Gold in the Street (1934)
- Second Bureau (1935)
- Veille d'armes (1935)
- Lovers and Thieves (1935)
- Wolves Between Them (1936)
- A Man to Kill (1937)
- Double Crime in the Maginot Line (1937)
- Captain Benoit (1938)
- Women's Prison (1938)
- The Chess Player (1938)
- The World Will Tremble (1939)
- Midnight Tradition (1939)
- Facing Destiny (1940)
- Moulin Rouge (1941)
- Dorothy Looks for Love (1945)
- Night Warning (1946)
- Midnight in Paris (2011) (Instrumental)
