= The Lost Woman (1942 film) =

1942 film

- Directed by: Jean Choux
- Written by: Alfred Machard (novel); Émile Roussel; Robert Coulom; Georges André-Cuel
- Produced by: Jean Séfert
- Starring: Renée Saint-Cyr; Jean Murat; Jean Galland
- Cinematography: René Colas
- Edited by: André Versein
- Music by: Vincent Scotto
- Production company: Le Consortium de Productions de Films
- Distributed by: Consortium du Film
- Release date: 5 August 1942
- Running time: 95 minutes
- Country: France
- Language: French

The Lost Woman (French: La femme perdue) is a 1942 French drama film directed by Jean Choux and starring Renée Saint-Cyr, Jean Murat and Jean Galland. It was shot at the Cité Elgé Studios in Paris. The film's sets were designed by the art director Roland Quignon.

== Cast ==
- Renée Saint-Cyr as Marie Vidal
- Jean Murat as Jean Dubart
- Jean Galland as Pierre
- Roger Duchesne as L'abbé
- Marguerite Pierry as Tante Sophie
- Pierre Labry as Le cabaretier
- Frédéric Mariotti as Martin
- Lise Florelly as La cuisinière
- France Ellys as Madame Vidal
- Lina Roxa as La cabaretière
- Jean Rigaux as Le père Grabouille
- Georges Guétary as Le chanteur à la fête
- Violette France as Madeleine
- Clary Monthal as La bonne
- René Bourbon as Lautier
- Monique Dubois as Jeannette
- Myno Burney as Adrienne
- Catherine Fonteney as Madame Valin
- Albert Broquin as Le clochard
- Marfa d'Hervilly as La dame curieuse
- Maxime Fabert as Le contrôleur

== Bibliography ==
- Billiard, Pierre. L'âge classique du cinéma français: du cinéma parlant à la Nouvelle Vague. Flammarion, 1995.
- Burch, Noël & Sellier, Geneviève. The Battle of the Sexes in French Cinema, 1930–1956. Duke University Press, 2013.
- Rège, Philippe. Encyclopedia of French Film Directors, Volume 1. Scarecrow Press, 2009.
