= Mistral (film) =

1943 film

- Directed by: Jacques Houssin
- Written by: Jacques Carton; Jacques Houssin
- Based on: Le Mistral by Jacques Carton
- Produced by: Charles-Félix Tavano
- Starring: Roger Duchesne; Ginette Leclerc; Fernand Charpin
- Cinematography: Paul Cotteret
- Edited by: Jacques Grassi
- Music by: Vincent Scotto
- Production company: Société de Production et de Doublage de Films
- Distributed by: Éclair-Journal
- Release date: 8 April 1943
- Running time: 75 minutes
- Country: France
- Language: French

Mistral (French: Le mistral) is a 1943 French comedy film directed by Jacques Houssin and starring Roger Duchesne, Ginette Leclerc, and Fernand Charpin. The film's sets were designed by the art director Roland Quignon. The film takes its title from the Mistral, a strong wind blowing on the Mediterranean coast of France.

== Synopsis ==
In a small port on the coast of Provence a number of the inhabitants go about their daily lives. A femme fatale sets out to ensnare a young man and draw him away from his girlfriend.

== Cast ==
- Roger Duchesne as Philippe
- Ginette Leclerc as Stella
- Fernand Charpin as Le curé
- Orane Demazis as Françoise
- Félicien Tramel as Florentin
- Andrex as Charles
- Paul Ollivier as Siméon
- Richard Francoeur as Le vicaire
- Georges Péclet as L'inspecteur général

== Bibliography ==
- Rège, Philippe. Encyclopedia of French Film Directors, Volume 1. Scarecrow Press, 2009.
- Siclier, Jacques. La France de Pétain et son cinéma. H. Veyrier, 1981.
