= Maurice Thiriet =

French composer (1906–1972)

Maurice Thiriet (French: [tiʁjɛ]; 2 May 1906 – 28 September 1972) was a French composer of classical and film music.

== Biography ==
Born in Meulan, Yvelines, Maurice Thiriet attended the Paris Conservatory from 1925 to 1931, studying counterpoint and fugue with Charles Koechlin, and orchestration and arrangement under Alexis Roland-Manuel. Thiriet's career revolved mainly around film music, completing around seventy scores from 1942 to 1960. A fellow composer Maurice Jaubert, whose life was cut short during World War II, is often cited as a major influence on Thiriet's outlook.

In 1939, Jacques Rouché opened the doors of the Paris Opéra to him with La Nuit vénitienne, a ballet that immediately won over Reynaldo Hahn. Mobilized in 1940, he was taken prisoner and sent to Stalag IX A. During his imprisonment, he wrote Trois Motets for choir and Œdipe roi, an oratorio that premiered in Paris on January 11, 1942, after his return to France. It was performed by the Chorale Yvonne Gouverné and the Orchestre de la Société des Concerts du Conservatoire, conducted by Charles Munch. Jean Cocteau himself recited the text. The Trois Motets (Sub Tuum, O Salutaris, and Agnus Dei), written in memory of Maurice Jaubert, were first performed in 1941 by the Chorale Passani.

Besides his cinematic output, Thiriet also composed several concert works, including a concerto for the flute, twelve ballets, and three operas. His compositional style, which Jaubert and Roland-Manuel influenced, is characterized by taught construction and modest, nearly impressionistic harmonization, often bearing a neo-classical grace similar to that of the music of Francis Poulenc and Jean Françaix. Thiriet's work was also presented in the art competition during the 1948 Summer Olympics. Thiriet also wrote La Nigérienne, the former national anthem of Niger, in 1961.

== List of works ==
=== Stage and dramatic ===
- La Bourgois de Falaise – opera (1937)
- Psyché – ballet (1950)
- Herakles – ballet (1953)
- Œdipe-roi – sur le texte de Jean Cocteau for speaker and orchestra (1940–41) and on stage (1963)
- La véridique histoire du docteur – opéra comique (1937)
- La Locandiera – opéra-bouffe (1960)
- L'œuf à la coque – ballet (1949)
- Deuil en 24 heures – ballet (1953)
- La nuit vénitienne – ballet (1939)
- La chaloupée – ballet (1960)
- La chambre noire – ballet-bouffe (1955)
- La précaution inutile (sur des thèmes de Rossini) – ballet (1946)
- La reine des iles – ballet (1955)
- Le maure de Venise – ballet (1958)
- Les amants de Mayerling – ballet (1960)
- Les jeux de l'amour et du placard – ballet-opérette (1953)
- Messaline – théatre (1947)
- Vogue la galère – théatre (1952)

=== Orchestra ===
- Le Livre pour Jean (1929)
- Rhapsody on Inca Themes (1935)
- Poem, for strings (1936)
- La Nuit Fantasque (1941)
- Les visiteurs du soir (1947)

=== Concertante ===
- Introduction, Chanson et Ronde, harp and orchestra (1936)
- Flute Concerto, flute and string orchestra (1959)

== Selected filmography ==
- Once Upon a Time (1933)
- Southern Mail (1937)
- Adrienne Lecouvreur (1938)
- The Most Beautiful Girl in the World (1938)
- The Man Who Played with Fire (1942)
- The Wolf of the Malveneurs (1943)
- Vautrin (1943)
- Pamela (1945)
- The Eternal Husband (1946)
- Not So Stupid (1946)
- Le Bataillon du ciel (1947)
- Eternal Conflict (1948)
- Three Boys, One Girl (1948)
- Du Guesclin (1949)
- Mystery in Shanghai (1950)
- Passion (1951)
- The House on the Dune (1952)
- The Air of Paris (1954)
- La Tour, prends garde ! (1958)
- Eyes of Love (1959)

== Sources ==
^ Mark Brill "Maurice Thiriet" in The Grove Dictionary of Music and Musicians
