= Dorothy Looks for Love =

1945 film

- Directed by: Edmond T. Gréville
- Written by: Gérard Carlier; Jacques Chabannes; Jean Josipovici; Georges de Tervagne
- Produced by: Charles Méré
- Starring: Suzy Carrier; Claude Dauphin; Jules Berry
- Cinematography: Nicolas Hayer
- Edited by: Georges Arnstam
- Music by: Jean Lenoir
- Production company: Les Films Minerva
- Distributed by: Les Films Minerva
- Release date: 9 November 1945
- Running time: 90 minutes
- Country: France
- Language: French

Dorothy Looks for Love (French: Dorothée cherche l'amour) is a 1945 French drama film directed by Edmond T. Gréville and starring Suzy Carrier, Claude Dauphin and Jules Berry. The film's sets were designed by the art director Jean Douarinou.

== Cast ==
- Suzy Carrier as Dorothée
- Claude Dauphin as Robert
- Jules Berry as M. Pascal
- Henri Guisol as André Vincent
- Samson Fainsilber as Sylvain
- Luce Feyrer
- Robert Arnoux
- Maurice Maillot
- Gaston Orbal
- Félix Oudart

== Bibliography ==
- Philippe Rège. Encyclopedia of French Film Directors, Volume 1. Scarecrow Press, 2009.
