= Pierre Magnier =

French actor

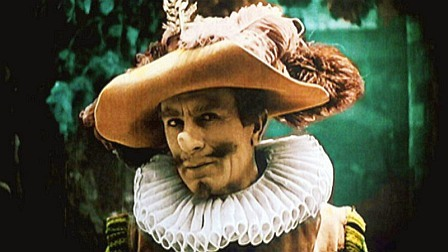
- Born: Pierre Frédéric Magnier; 22 February 1869; Paris, Second French Empire
- Died: 15 October 1959 (aged 90); Clichy-la-Garenne, Hauts-de-Seine, France
- Occupation: Actor
- Years active: 1895–1953

Pierre Frédéric Magnier (February 22, 1869 – October 15, 1959) was a French actor who began on the stage in the 1890s and became a prominent silent film actor in France. He was the second actor to portray Cyrano de Bergerac in any film in 1925. He continued acting until the 1950s. He is most remembered for the role of the General in Jean Renoir's La règle du jeu, where he has one of the films more poignant quotes (and the film's final line) when he praises Marcel Dalio's character as one of "a vanishing breed."

== Selected filmography ==
- Le Duel D'Hamlet with Sarah Bernhardt (1900)
- André Cornélis (1918)
- La Roue (1923)
- Paris (1924)
- Cyrano de Bergerac (1925)
- Tossing Ship (1932)
- Antoinette (1932)
- All for Love (1933)
- The Two Orphans (1933)
- Mam'zelle Spahi (1934)
- Second Bureau (1935)
- Wolves Between Them (1936)
- Lady Killer (1937)
- The Lie of Nina Petrovna (1937)
- Double Crime in the Maginot Line (1937)
- The Cheat (1937)
- Ignace (1937)
- The Forsaken (1937)
- A Man to Kill (1937)
- The Ladies in the Green Hats (1937)
- Golden Venus (1938)
- Captain Benoit (1938)
- Personal Column (1939)
- Coral Reefs (1939)
- Serenade (1940)
- The Woman I Loved Most (1942)
- Jeannou (1943)
- Mahlia the Mestiza (1943)
- White Wings (1943)
- Lessons in Conduct (1946)
- The Misfortunes of Sophie (1946)
- The Captain (1946)
- Mirror (1947)
- Judicial Error (1948)
- The Murdered Model (1948)
- Colomba (1948)
- Ruy Blas (1948)
- The Nude Woman (1949)
- Paris Still Sings (1951)
- The Priest of Saint-Amour (1952)
- Monsieur Leguignon, Signalman (1952)
- The Porter from Maxim's (1953)
