= Under the Leather Helmet =

1932 film

- Directed by: Albert de Courville
- Written by: Pierre Sabatier
- Starring: Pierre Richard-Willm; Gina Manès; Gaston Modot
- Cinematography: Maurice Forster
- Production company: Cinemasques
- Release date: 27 April 1932
- Running time: 95 minutes
- Countries: France; United Kingdom
- Language: French

Under the Leather Helmet (French: Sous le casque de cuir) is a 1932 British-French drama film directed by Albert de Courville and starring Pierre Richard-Willm, Gina Manès and Gaston Modot. The film's sets were designed by the art director Pierre Schild.

== Cast ==
- Pierre Richard-Willm as Le capitaine Sourvian
- Gina Manès as Florica Romanescu
- Gaston Modot as Le capitaine Simianoff
- Marie Barge as Helena
- Pierre Nay as Le Lt. des Roseaux
- Raymond Destac as Sudek
- Max Lerel as Reynier
- George Rigaud as Le Lt. Beaufort
- Petitjean as Le Lt. Vintilla
- Henri Lévêque as Le Lt. Stream
- De Kerstrat as Le Col. Philipesti
- Dubreuil as Le Lt. Pola Vaccis
- René Donnio

== Bibliography ==
- Crisp, Colin. Genre, Myth and Convention in the French Cinema, 1929-1939. Indiana University Press, 2002.
