= Song of Farewell =

1934 film

- Directed by: Albert Valentin; Géza von Bolváry
- Written by: Jacques Théry (novel); Ernst Marischka; Jacques Natanson
- Produced by: Siegfried Fritz Fromm
- Starring: Jean Servais; Janine Crispin; Lucienne Le Marchand
- Cinematography: Werner Brandes
- Edited by: Hermann Haller
- Music by: Alois Melichar
- Production company: Boston Film
- Distributed by: Films Sonores Tobis
- Release date: 3 November 1934
- Running time: 87 minutes
- Country: Germany
- Language: French

Song of Farewell (French: La chanson de l'adieu) is a 1934 historical musical drama film directed by Albert Valentin and Géza von Bolváry and starring Jean Servais, Janine Crispin and Lucienne Le Marchand. It is based on the life of the composer Frédéric Chopin and his relationship with George Sand.

It was produced by the German company Boston Films as the French-language version of the German film Farewell Waltz. Such multiple-language versions were common in the early years of sound before dubbing became widespread. The film's sets were designed by the art director Arthur Schwarz.

== Cast ==
- Jean Servais as Frédéric Chopin
- Janine Crispin as Constantia Glodkowska
- Lucienne Le Marchand as George Sand
- Marcel André as Friedrich Karlbrenner
- Daniel Lecourtois as Franz Liszt
- Marcel Vallée as Professor Josef Elsner
- Erna Morena as La Baronne d'Orléans
- Paul Asselin
- Christiane Dor
- Jean Fay
- Catherine Fonteney
- Pierre Sergeol
- Marc Valbel

== Bibliography ==
- Mitchell, Charles P. The Great Composers Portrayed on Film, 1913 through 2002. McFarland, 2004.
