= Léon Barsacq =

Production designer

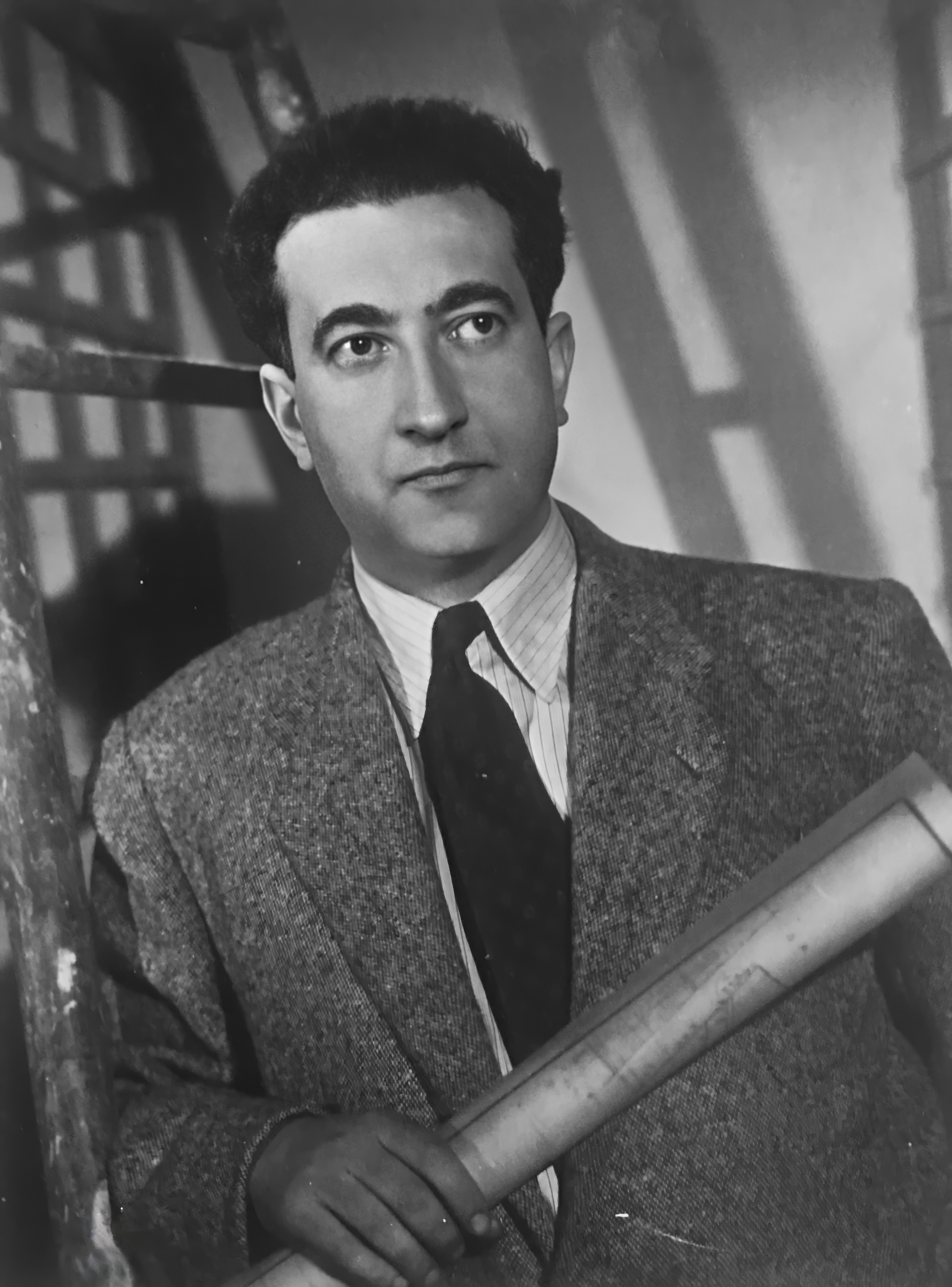
- Born: 18 October 1906; Feodosiya, Crimea, Russian Empire (now Ukraine)
- Died: 23 December 1969 (aged 63); Paris, France
- Occupations: Production designer Art director Set decorator
- Years active: 1934-1968

Léon Barsacq (18 October 1906 – 23 December 1969) was a Russian-born and naturalized French production designer, art director and set decorator. He was nominated for an Academy Award in the category Best Art Direction for the film The Longest Day. He was the brother of French theatre director André Barsacq and the father of film actor Yves Barsacq.

== Selected filmography ==
- Compliments of Mister Flow (1936)
- Southern Mail (1937)
- I Was an Adventuress (1938)
- The World Will Tremble (1939)
- Beating Heart (1940)
- The Mysteries of Paris (1943)
- Children of Paradise (1945)
- The Last Vacation (1948)
- Eternal Conflict (1948)
- White Paws (1949)
- Maya (1949)
- The Glass Castle (1950)
- Two Pennies Worth of Violets (1951)
- Imperial Violets (1952)
- The Beauty of Cadiz (1953)
- Their Last Night (1953)
- The Lady of the Camellias (1953)
- Fruits of Summer (1955)
- The Ambassador's Daughter (1956)
- All the Gold in the World (1961)
- The Longest Day (1962)
- Black Sun (1966)
