= The Woman Thief =

- Directed by: Abel Gance
- Written by: Julien Fave; Pierre Frondaie (novel); Abel Gance
- Produced by: Louis de Carbonnat
- Starring: Jules Berry; Annie Ducaux; Suzanne Desprès
- Cinematography: Roger Hubert
- Edited by: Jacques Manuel
- Music by: Henri Verdun
- Production company: Films Union Pisorno Cinematografica
- Distributed by: Gallia Cine (France); Cine Tirrenia (Italy)
- Release date: 30 March 1938
- Running time: 87 minutes
- Countries: France; Italy
- Language: French

The Woman Thief (French: Le voleur de femmes) is a 1938 French-Italian drama film directed by Abel Gance and starring Jules Berry, Annie Ducaux and Suzanne Desprès.

It was made at the Pisorno Studios in Tirrenia. The film's sets were designed by Jacques Colombier.

== Cast ==
- Jules Berry as Sadoc Torner
- Annie Ducaux as Anita
- Suzanne Desprès as Madame Torner / La signora Torner
- Jean-Max as Barchevin
- Blanchette Brunoy as Madeleine Barchevin
- Marie Lou as Pivoine, la chanteuse / Pivoine, la cantante
- Giorgio Capecchi as Pierrot (Italian version)
- Gilbert Gil as Pierrot (French version)
- Saturnin Fabre as L'académicien / L'accademico
- Valentino Bruchi
- Cellio Bucchi
- Jaque Catelain
- Lisa Matray
- Robert Ozanne
- Princesse Kandou as Une danseuse / una danzatrice
- Mario Ulivari

== Bibliography ==
- Frank Burke. A Companion to Italian Cinema. John Wiley & Sons, 2017.
