= Charles Robert-Dumas =

French novelist (1875–1946)

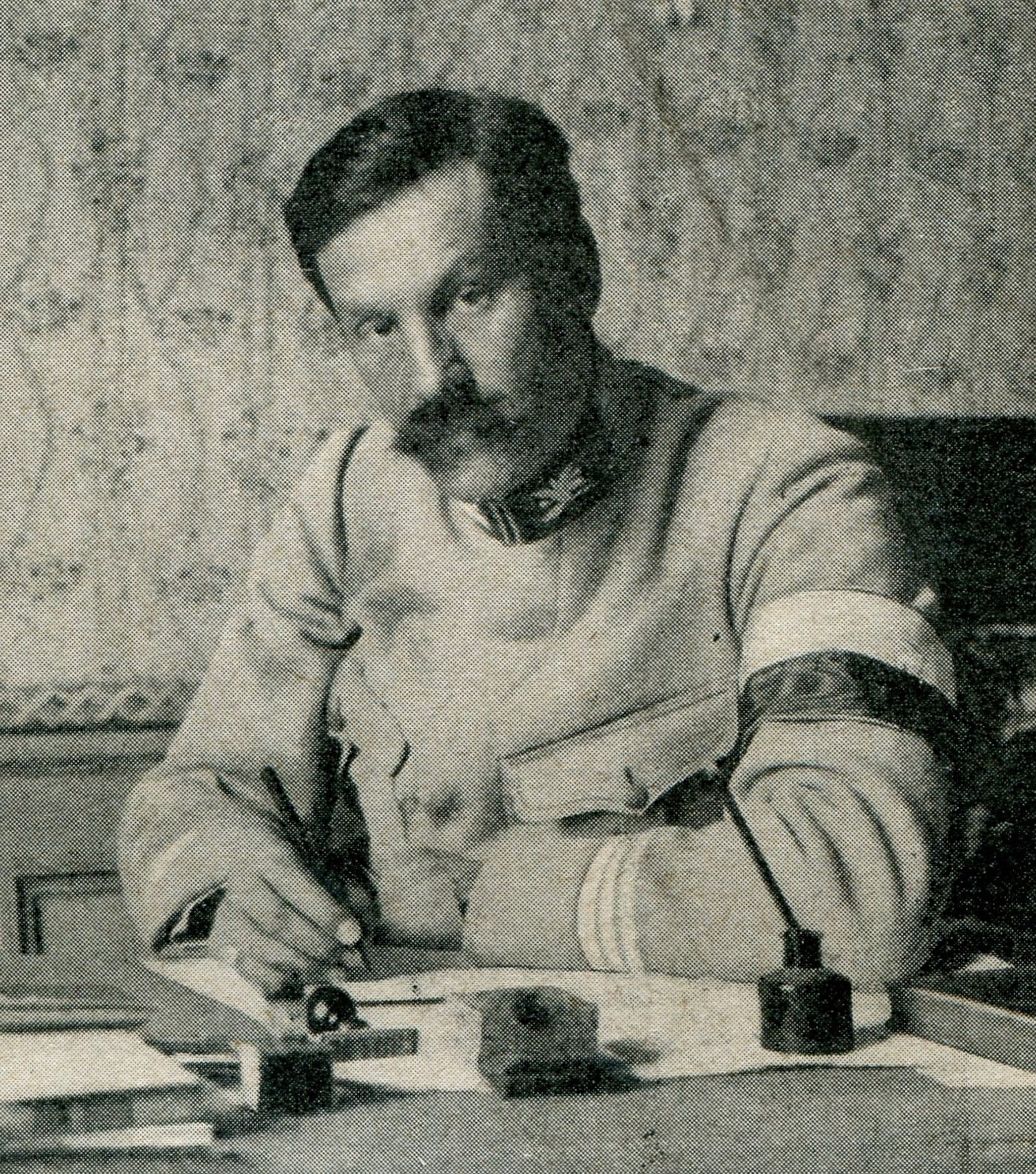
- Robert-Dumas in 1915.
- Born: 4 January 1875; Paris, France
- Died: 19 August 1946 (aged 71); Reims, France
- Occupation: Novelist

Charles Robert-Dumas (1875–1946) was a French novelist, particularly specialising in the crime and spy genres. Several of his works have been adapted for the screen. He is particularly known for his series featuring the French spy Captain Benoît of the Deuxième Bureau, a nemesis of the Germans. The popularity the series enjoyed in the 1930s, with the growing threat of war with Nazi Germany, was analogous to Ian Fleming's later James Bond series of novels.

== Selected filmography ==
- Second Bureau (1935)
- Second Bureau (1936)
- Wolves Between Them (1936)
- A Man to Kill (1937)
- Captain Benoit (1938)
- Secret Journey (1939)
- Facing Destiny (1940)

== Bibliography ==
- Crisp, Colin. French Cinema—A Critical Filmography: Volume 1, 1929-1939. Indiana University Press, 2015.
- Goble, Alan. The Complete Index to Literary Sources in Film. Walter de Gruyter, 1999.
- Young, Robert J. France and the Origins of the Second World War. Bloomsbury Publishing, 1996.
