= Café de Paris (film) =

- Directed by: Yves Mirande; Georges Lacombe
- Starring: Véra Korène; Jules Berry; Simone Berriau
- Release date: 23 September 1938
- Running time: 91 minutes
- Country: France
- Language: French

Café de Paris is a 1938 French mystery film directed by Yves Mirande and Georges Lacombe.

== Partial cast ==
- Véra Korène as Geneviève Lambert
- Jules Berry as Fleury
- Simone Berriau as Odette
- Jacques Baumer as Le commissaire de police
- Pierre Brasseur as Le Rec
- Julien Carette as Le journaliste
- Florence Marly as Estelle
- Raymone as La dame des lavabos
- Janine Guise as Mlle Aurillac
- Marcel Vallée as Le chef de la sureté
- Maurice Escande as Le marquis de Perelli
- Jacques Grétillat as Lambert
- André Roanne as Mouvance
- Marcel Simon as Monsieur Durand
