= Roger Duchesne =

French actor

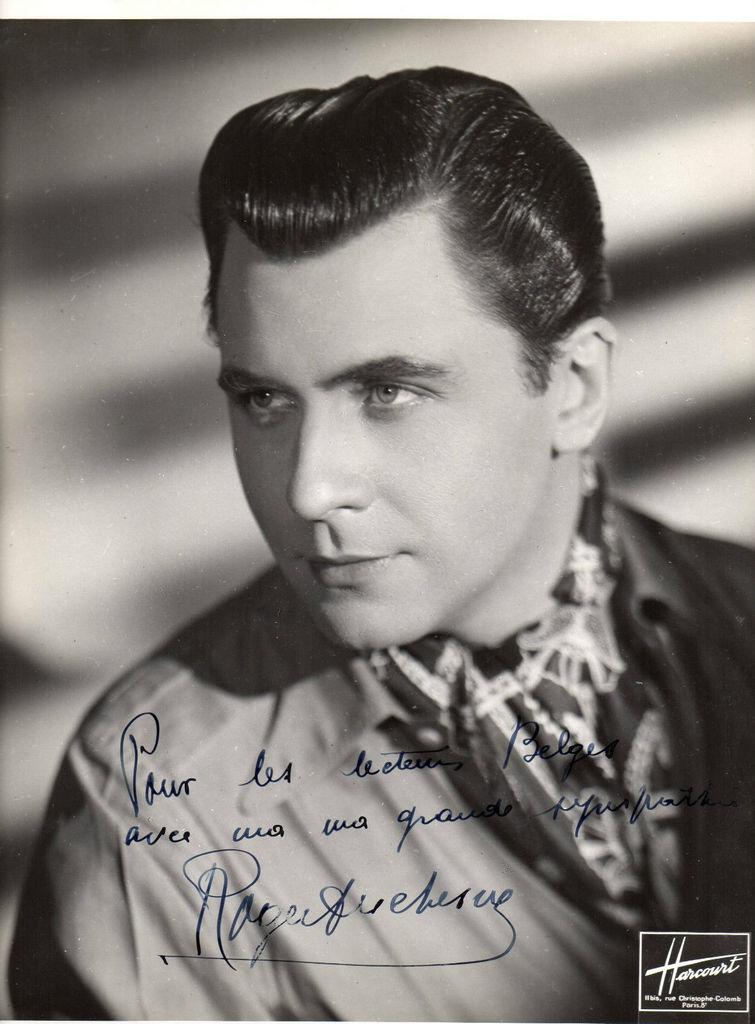
- Duchesne in 1930s
- Born: 27 July 1906; Luxeuil-les-Bains, Haute-Saône, France
- Died: 25 December 1996 (aged 90); Les Mureaux, Yvelines, France
- Other name: Roger Jordaens
- Occupation: Actor
- Years active: 1934–1957 (film)

Roger Duchesne (27 July 1906, Luxeuil-les-Bains, Haute-Saône – 25 December 1996) was a French film actor. He appeared in 30 films between 1934 and 1957, but is best remembered for playing the lead in Bob le flambeur (1956). He was the first husband of French film actress Yvette Lebon.

Controversy surrounds Duchesne for activities during the German occupation of France during World War II. An history of French cinema during the war (1985), citing a French film historian, states that Duchesne had been among three film workers who suffered "serious sanctions" for wartime activities on behalf of the German occupiers; he "was suspected of working for the Gestapo." According to a 2019 review of the Kino-released DVD of Bob le flambeur, a featurette on the disc informs that the actor's "gambling debts caught the attentions of the Nazis during the Occupation, and Duchesne became a collaborator, actively participating in the torture of at least one member of the French Resistance." Not surprisingly, the review notes Bob le flambeur was Duchesne's first film since the war and he only appeared in one more thereafter. Unable to work as an actor immediately after the war, Duchesne was reduced to writing trashy adventure novels and later, to actual crime.

Film director Jean-Pierre Melville, ironically himself a Jewish member of the French Resistance during the war, recruited Duchesne for Bob le flambeur. According to one account, the actor had been prohibited from working by the postwar purge ("epuration") of collaborators. "Duchesne robbed a bank of 800 million francs—the same sum Bob tries to steal [in the film] in Deauville-—then cooled his heels in prison writing adventure novels. When Melville tracked him down, he was selling scrap metal in Saint-Ouen."

== Selected filmography ==
- Vers l'abîme (film, 1934) (1934)
- Fanfare of Love (1935)
- Le Golem (1936)
- Wolves Between Them (1936)
- Seven Men, One Woman (1936)
- Taras Bulba (1936)
- Conflict (1938)
- Storm Over Asia (1938)
- Gibraltar (1938)
- The Indian Tomb (1938)
- Prison sans barreaux (1938)
- Savage Brigade (1939)
- The World Will Tremble (1939)
- Immediate Call (1939)
- Cartacalha, reine des gitans (1942)
- The Lost Woman (1942)
- The Guardian Angel (1942)
- Mistral (1943)
- Jeannou (1943)
- Adrien (1943)
- Bob le flambeur (1956)
- Marchands de filles (1957)
