= Second Bureau (1935 film) =

1935 film

- Directed by: Pierre Billon
- Written by: Charles Robert-Dumas (novel); Bernard Zimmer
- Produced by: Antoine de Rouvre; Jacques Schwob-d'Héricourt
- Starring: Jean Murat; Véra Korène; Janine Crispin; Jean-Max
- Cinematography: Georges Asselin]
- Edited by: Marguerite Beaugé
- Music by: Jean Lenoir
- Production company: Société des Films Vega
- Distributed by: Compagnie Française Cinématographique
- Release date: 20 September 1935
- Running time: 105 minutes
- Country: France
- Language: French

Second Bureau (French: Deuxième bureau) is a 1935 French spy romance film directed by Pierre Billon and starring Jean Murat, Véra Korène and Janine Crispin. It is based on the novel Second Bureau by Charles Robert-Dumas. The following year it was Second Bureau by Victor Hanbury. The book was one of a spy series Ceux du S. R. published in France by Librarie Arthème Fayard in 1934. The film's sets were designed by the art director Aimé Bazin. It was followed by a sequel Wolves Between Them in 1936.

== Synopsis ==
Capitaine Benoit of the French secret service manages to steal the plans of Germany's new fighter plane. German intelligence assigns one of their top female agents to recover the stolen designs.

== Partial cast ==
- Jean Murat as Capitaine Benoit
- Véra Korène as L'Espionne Erna Flieder
- Janine Crispin as Dorothee
- Jean-Max as Comte Brusilot
- Pierre Alcover as Weygelmann
- Pierre Magnier as Colonel Guerraud
- Georges Prieur as General Von Raugwitz
- Geno Ferny as L'Aubergiste
- Pierre Larquey as Asjundant Colleret
- Jean Galland as Lieutenant Van Strammer
- Andrée Moreau as Nageberger
- Henry Bonvallet as Schaffingen

== Critical reception ==
Writing for The Spectator in 1936, Graham Greene characterized the film as "a rather dull film, [and as] a long packed melodrama". With the exception of the "sinister and satiric" first scene that was described as "brilliant", Greene took the view that on the whole "the film is too thick with drama". Taking issue with the film's genre, Greene suggests that satire and realism would have been more effective in handling the picture's themes.

== Bibliography ==
- Low, Rachael. Filmmaking in 1930s Britain. George Allen & Unwin, 1985.
