= Storm over Asia (1938 film) =

1938 French film by Richard Oswald

Storm Over Asia
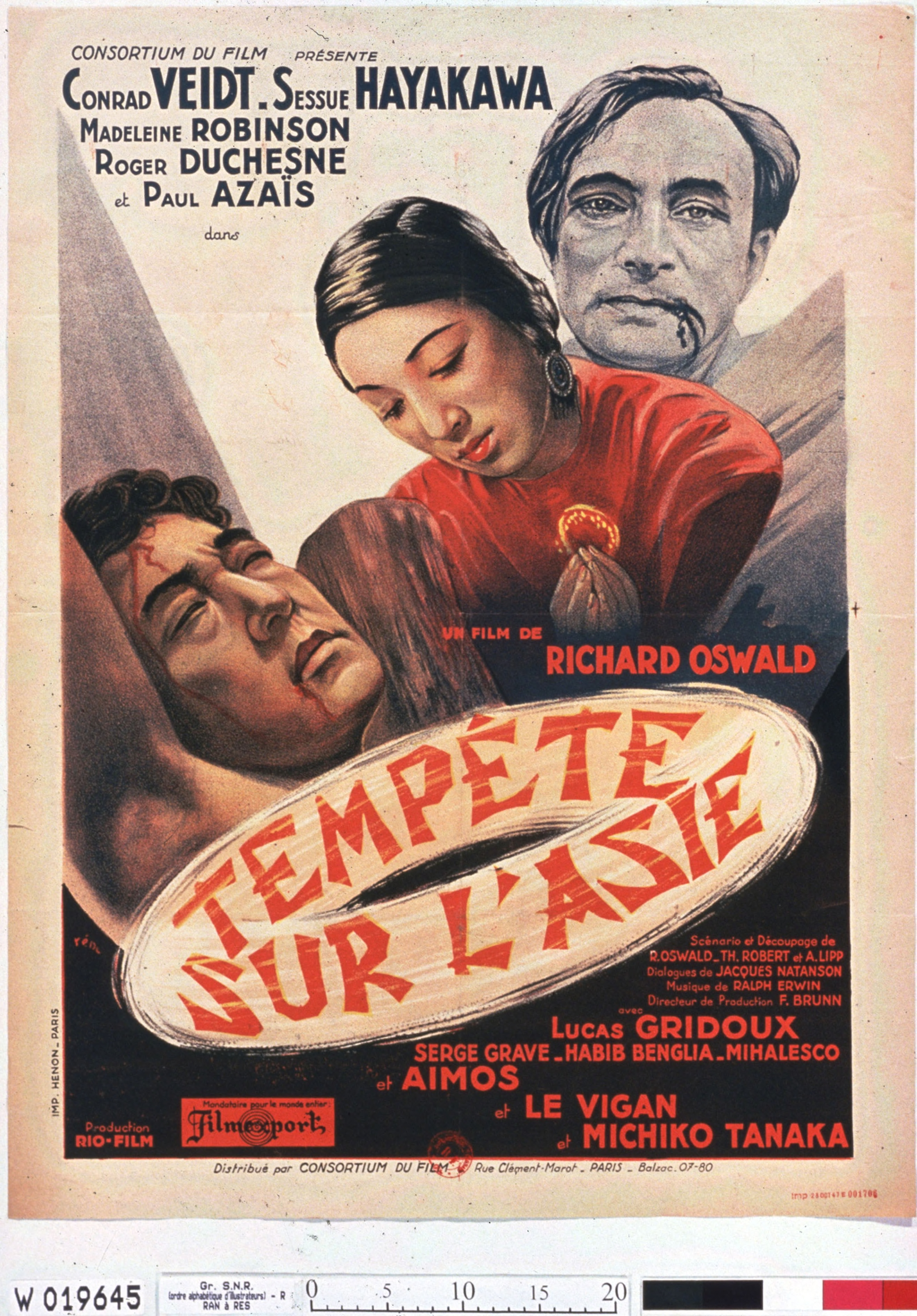
- Directed by: Richard Oswald
- Written by: Arnold Lippschitz; Jacques Natanson; Richard Oswald; T.H. Robert
- Produced by: Frederic Brunn
- Starring: Conrad Veidt; Sessue Hayakawa; Madeleine Robinson
- Cinematography: Philippe Agostini; Theodore J. Pahle
- Edited by: Max Brenner; Claude Ibéria
- Music by: Ralph Erwin; Paul Saegel
- Production company: Rio Films
- Distributed by: Les Films Sefert
- Release date: 21 April 1938
- Running time: 95 minutes
- Country: France
- Language: French

Storm over Asia (French: Tempête sur l'Asie) is a 1938 French drama film directed by Richard Oswald and starring Conrad Veidt, Sessue Hayakawa and Madeleine Robinson.

== Production ==
Oswald had left Austria as it became an increasingly hostile working environment in the years leading up to Anschluss. It was his last film in Europe, before he moved to the United States and made three films in Hollywood. Conrad Veidt was similarly an exile from Germany, and had settled in Britain.

The film's sets were designed by the art directors Claude Bouxin and Raymond Gabutti.

== Synopsis ==
An adventurer gets into a series of scrapes when he tries to secure control of oil deposits in Mongolia.

== Reception ==
Reviewing the film Variety wrote that it was "a moderately good adventure drama" and predicted it would enjoy commercial success in France due to the popularity of Conrad Veidt. Going on to observe "It's almost a one-man film and Veidt makes all there is to be made out of a story that sometimes is fantastic enough to seem ludicrous".

== Cast ==
- Conrad Veidt as Erich Keith
- Sessue Hayakawa as Le prince Ling
- Madeleine Robinson as Suzanne
- Lucas Gridoux as Jack Murphy
- Serge Grave as Jimmy
- Paul Azaïs as Jonny le pianiste
- Robert Le Vigan as Sir Richard
- Raymond Aimos as Pierre, le pickpocket
- Alexandre Mihalesco as Le fou
- Habib Benglia as Washington-Napoléon Brown
- Michiko Tanaka as Le princesse Shô
- Roger Duchesne as Le Docteur Leclerc

== Bibliography ==
- John T. Soister. Conrad Veidt on Screen: A Comprehensive Illustrated Filmography. McFarland, 2002.
