= A Man to Kill =

1937 film

- Directed by: Léon Mathot
- Written by: Carlo Rim
- Based on: A Man to Kill by Charles Robert-Dumas
- Produced by: Antoine de Rouvre; Jacques Schwob-d'Héricourt
- Starring: Jean Murat; Jules Berry; Viviane Romance
- Cinematography: René Gaveau
- Edited by: Jacques Desagneaux
- Music by: Jean Lenoir
- Production company: Compagnie Française Cinématographique
- Distributed by: La Société des films Sirius
- Release date: 25 February 1937
- Running time: 102 minutes
- Country: France
- Language: French

A Man to Kill (French: L'Homme à abattre) is a 1937 French spy thriller film directed by Léon Mathot and starring Jean Murat, Jules Berry and Viviane Romance. It was based on a novel of the same title by Charles Robert-Dumas. The film's sets were designed by the art director Jacques Colombier. It was the third in a series of four films, followed by Captain Benoît in 1938.

== Cast ==
- Jean Murat as Le capitaine Benoît
- Jules Berry as Le commissaire Raucourt
- Roger Karl as Le commissaire Werter
- Viviane Romance as Hilda
- Raymond Aimos as Vic
- Bernard Lancret as Stéphane Gietzinger
- Madeleine Robinson as Andrée Ruval
- Pierre Magnier as Le colonel Guéraud
- Georges Prieur as Le général von Raugwitz
- Jean-Max as L'agent von Haidingen

== Bibliography ==
- Bessy, Maurice & Chirat, Raymond. Histoire du cinéma français: 1935-1939. Pygmalion, 1986.
- Crisp, Colin. Genre, Myth and Convention in the French Cinema, 1929-1939. Indiana University Press, 2002.
- Goble, Alan. The Complete Index to Literary Sources in Film. Walter de Gruyter, 1999.
- Rège, Philippe. Encyclopedia of French Film Directors, Volume 1. Scarecrow Press, 2009.
