= George Rigaud =

Argentine-French actor (1905-1984)

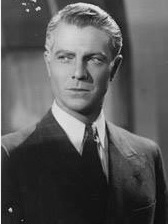
- Rigaud in El Gran secreto (1942)
- Born: Pedro Jorge Rigato Delissetche; 11 August 1905; Buenos Aires, Argentina
- Died: 17 January 1984 (aged 78); Leganés, Community of Madrid, Spain
- Other names: George Rigaud; Georges Rigaud
- Occupation: Actor
- Years active: 1932–1981

Pedro Jorge Rigato Delissetche (11 August 1905 – 17 January 1984) was an Argentine-French actor with an international film career. He appeared in nearly 200 films and television programs between 1932 and 1981, working at various times in France, Spain, Italy, and the United States. He was usually credited as George Rigaud or Georges Rigaud.

== Early life ==
Rigaud was born Pedro Jorge Rigato Delissetche in Buenos Aires in 1905, to parents of Italian and German descent. At age 8, he moved with his family to France, settling in Paris, where he Francized his name to "Georges Rigaud".

== Career ==
After attending drama school, Rigaud made his debut in the film Under the Leather Helmet (1932). He during the decade, he starred in three films directed by Max Ophüls (A Love Story, Divine, There's No Tomorrow). He worked with other prominent French directors like René Clair (Bastille Day), Marcel L'Herbier (Nights of Fire), and Paul Fejos (Fantômas), playing both leading and supporting roles.

In 1941, with the outbreak of World War II and impending German invasion, he returned to Argentina where he resumed his film career. He also had a brief dalliance in Hollywood later in the decade, playing supporting roles in the films Paris Underground (1945), Masquerade in Mexico (also 1945), and I Walk Alone (1947).

In 1956, Rigaud moved back to Europe and settled in Spain, where he spend the rest of his personal and professional life. He appeared in numerous films, primarily in supporting roles. He appeared in many horror, giallo, and Spaghetti Western films, raising his profile among genre film fans.

== Death ==
Rigaud died at the age of 78 in Leganés on 17 January 1984, of injuries sustained in a road accident. His remains were buried at the common ossuary in the parish cemetery of Leganés. In 2023, after 45 years, his burial site finally received a gravestone.

== Legacy ==
A Spanish documentary about Rigaud's life, Osario Norte, los últimos días de San Valentín, was released in 2024.

In 2025, the Leganés city council placed a plaque on Cádiz Street, where Rigaud died.

== Selected filmography ==
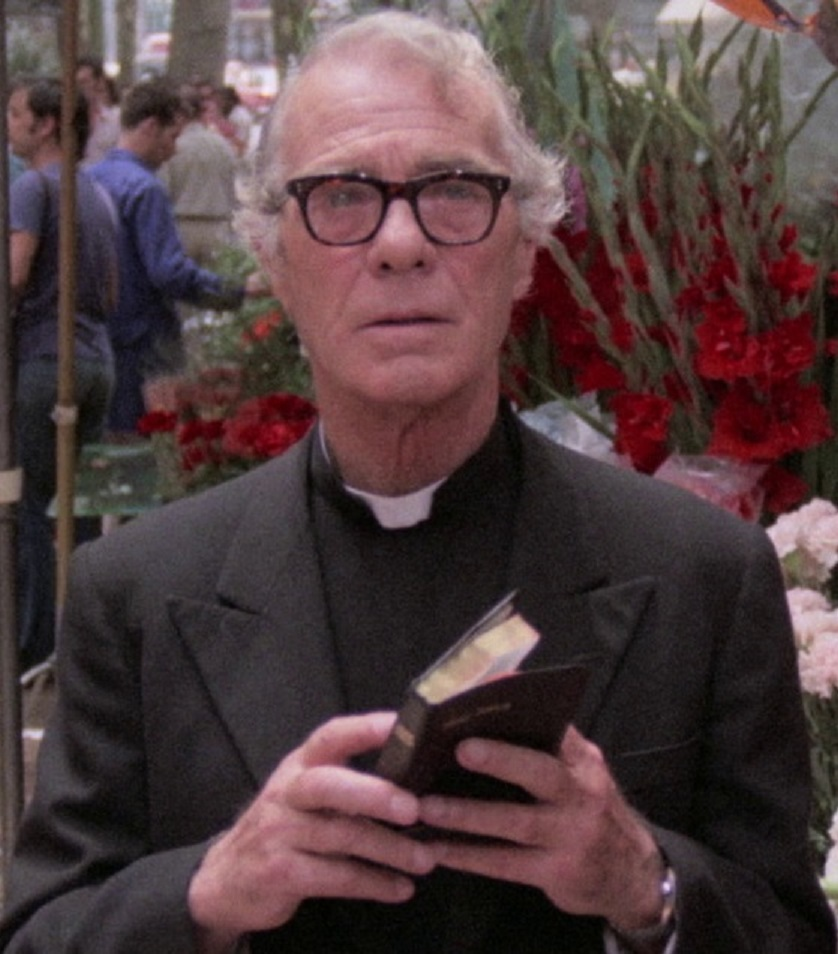
Rigaud in Eyeball (1975)

- Under the Leather Helmet (1932)
- Fantômas (1932)
- Beauty Spot (1932)
- The Regiment's Champion (1932)
- Bastille Day (1933)
- Idylle au Caire (1933)
- The Orderly (1933)
- A Love Story (1933)
- Divine (1935)
- Nitchevo (1936)
- Charley's Aunt (1936)
- Parisian Life (1936)
- Nuits de feu (1937)
- Sarati the Terrible (1937)
- Wells in Flames (1937)
- Final Accord (1938)
- The Postmaster's Daughter (1938)
- There's No Tomorrow (1939)
- Facing Destiny (1940)
- Abandonment (1940)
- Three Argentines in Montmartre (1941)
- Paris Underground (1945)
- I Walk Alone (1948)
- The Trap (1949)
- Native Son (1951)
- They Fired with Their Lives (1951)
- Mi calle (1960)
- The Colossus of Rhodes (1961)
- The Happy Thieves (1961) as Spanish Police Inspector
- The Secret of the Black Widow (1963)
- The Black Tulip (1964)
- Brandy (1964)
- That Man in Istanbul (1965)
- The Hell of Manitoba (1965)
- Black Box Affair (1966)
- Special Code: Assignment Lost Formula (1966)
- Savage Pampas (1966)
- Honeymoon, Italian Style (1966)
- Grand Slam (1967)
- It's Your Move (1968)
- Guns of the Magnificent Seven (1969)
- One on Top of the Other (1969)
- Marta (1971)
- A Lizard in a Woman's Skin (1971)
- Death Walks on High Heels (1971)
- Horror Express (1972)
- All the Colors of the Dark (1972)
- Knife of Ice (1972)
- His Name Was Holy Ghost (1972)
- The Case of the Bloody Iris (1972)
- Eyeball (1975)
- Timm Thaler (1979, TV series)
- Maravillas (1981)
