= André Fouché =

French actor

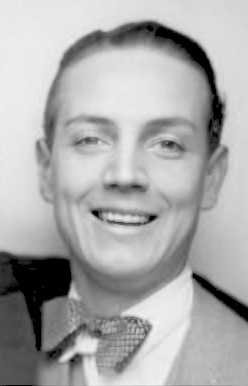
Image of Andre Fouche

André Eugène Fouché (French pronunciation: [ɑ̃dʁe fuʃe]; 17 September 1908 – 23 July 2001) was a French actor.

Fouché was born in Paris and died in Poissy, Yvelines, Île-de-France.

== Filmography ==
Year	Title	Role
1932	Danton	Camille Desmoulins
1934	Madame Bovary	Justin
1934	L'or	
1935	Return to Paradise	
1936	Mayerling	Georges Vetsera
1936	Les grands	Leon Brassier
1936	César	Césariot
1937	The Dark Angels	Andrès
1938	Ceux de demain	
1938	La piste du sud	Le sous-lieutenant Beaumont
1938	Les rois de la flotte	
1938	Champions of France	Bob Bernard
1942	The Benefactor	Claude de Vitrac
1943	The Count of Monte Cristo	Benedetto
1945	The Eleventh Hour Guest	Serge
1946	The Adventure of Cabassou	Ocyave
1946	The Faceless Enemy	Maxime Artus
1963	Landru	Le docteur Paul
1967	Playtime	Restaurant Manager
1968	Ces messieurs de la famille	Le proviseur
1972	Alfredo, Alfredo	

== Bibliography ==
- Oscherwitz, Dayna & Higgins, MaryEllen. The A to Z of French Cinema. Scarecrow Press, 2009.
