= The Chess Player (1938 film) =

- Directed by: Jean Dréville
- Written by: André Doderet; Jean Dréville; Albert Guyot; Roger Vitrac; Bernard Zimmer
- Based on: Le Jour d'échecs by Henry Dupuy-Mazuel
- Produced by: Antoine de Rouvre; Jacques Schwob-d'Héricourt
- Starring: Françoise Rosay; Conrad Veidt; Bernard Lancret
- Cinematography: René Gaveau; André Thomas
- Edited by: Raymond Leboursier
- Music by: Jean Lenoir
- Production company: Société des Films Vega
- Distributed by: Compagnie Française Cinématographique (France); Columbia Pictures (United States)
- Release dates: November 25, 1938 (France); December 3, 1939 (United States)
- Running time: 90 minutes
- Country: France
- Language: French

The Chess Player (French: Le joueur d'échecs) is a 1938 French historical drama film directed by Jean Dréville and starring Françoise Rosay, Conrad Veidt and Bernard Lancret. It is a remake of the 1927 silent film The Chess Player, itself based on the 1926 novel of the same title by Henry Dupuy-Mazuel. The film takes place in Vilnius during the reign of Catherine the Great.

It was shot at the Cité Elgé studios in Paris. The film's sets were designed by the art directors Lucien Aguettand and Marcel Magniez. It was released by Compagnie Française Cinématographique in France and Columbia Pictures in the United States

== Cast ==
- Françoise Rosay as Catherine II
- Conrad Veidt as Le baron de Kempelen
- Bernard Lancret as Le prince Serge Oblonsky
- Micheline Francey as Sonia Vorowska
- Paul Cambo as Le prince Boleslas Vorowsky
- Jacques Grétillat as Potemkine
- Jean Témerson as Stanislas, le roi de Pologne
- Edmonde Guy as Wanda Zalewska, la danseuse
- Gaston Modot as Major Nicolaieff

== Bibliography ==
- Crisp, Colin. Genre, Myth and Convention in the French Cinema, 1929-1939. Indiana University Press, 2002.
