= I Was an Adventuress (1938 film) =

- Directed by: Raymond Bernard
- Written by: Jacques Companéez; Michel Duran; Hans Jacoby; Herbert Juttke
- Produced by: Gregor Rabinovitch
- Starring: Edwige Feuillère; Jean Murat; Jean-Max
- Cinematography: Philippe Agostini; Michel Kelber
- Edited by: Charlotte Guilbert
- Music by: Paul Misraki
- Production company: Ciné-Alliance
- Distributed by: Les Films Osso
- Release date: 21 December 1938
- Running time: 103 minutes
- Country: France
- Language: French

I Was an Adventuress (French: J'étais une aventurière) is a 1938 French comedy drama film directed by Raymond Bernard and starring Edwige Feuillère, Jean Murat and Jean-Max. It was remade in 1940 as an American film of the same title. It was part of a growing trend of English-language remakes of major French films.

The film's sets were designed by the art directors Léon Barsacq and Jean Perrier.

== Main cast ==
- Edwige Feuillère as Véra Vronsky
- Jean Murat as Pierre Glorin
- Jean-Max as Désormeaux
- Guillaume de Sax as Le marquis Koréani
- Félix Oudart as Rutherford
- Milly Mathis as Une paysanne
- André Numès Fils as Le cousin Édouard
- Christian Argentin as Van Kongen
- Mona Goya as Une jeune femme
- Louis Vonelly as Texter
- Jean Tissier as Paulo
- Marguerite Moreno as Tante Émilie

== Bibliography ==
- Crisp, Colin. Genre, Myth and Convention in the French Cinema, 1929-1939. Indiana University Press, 2002.
