= J'accuse! (1938 film) =

1938 film

- Directed by: Abel Gance
- Written by: Abel Gance; Steve Passeur
- Produced by: Abel Gance
- Starring: Victor Francen
- Cinematography: Roger Hubert
- Edited by: Madeleine Crétolle
- Music by: Henri Verdun
- Production company: Forrester-Parant Productions
- Distributed by: Comptoir Français du Film (CFF)
- Release date: 30 October 1938
- Running time: 104 minutes
- Country: France
- Language: French

J'accuse! (French pronunciation: [ʒakyz]) is a 1938 French war film directed by Abel Gance and starring Victor Francen. It is a remake of the 1919 film of the same name, which was also directed by Gance.

== Plot ==
The Douaumont Cemetery features in the final part of the film.

The married Edith Laurin has a love affair with her husband's best friend, Jean. When both men serve together at the Verdun front her spouse realises he is cuckolded. Because his old friend is also his comrade who fights at his side against the mutual enemy, Laurin does not take action against him.

On 10 November 1918, everybody longs for an end to the war. The brass has randomly chosen a patrol to be sent to an almost certain death. Jean Diaz argues that the patrol is not necessary at least for that day. Captain Henri Chimay, however, does not dare to take the responsibility of canceling the mission. Diaz, who was the only survivor on a previous sortie, volunteers instead of a father of four. The Armistice of 11 November 1918 is proclaimed after the patrol has been wiped away. François Laurin dies while Diaz is wounded.

Diaz works successfully for the Pierrefonds glassworks. He looks after the widow Edith and her daughter Helene, but keeps his distance because of his promise to François. Struggling with his feelings, he moves to the former front. There he finds again Flo, a chanteuse and cabaret owner, who did a lot for soldiers' morale during the war. Both remember the fallen. Diaz devotes himself to his promise to the patrol to stop war forever. He researches a "steel glass" breastplate. Chimay, who has inherited the glassworks, appropriates the invention and provides it to the French government as part of the preparations for a future war. Jean's love for Edith has transferred to young Helene. The love triangle makes all suffer. Jean's wounds affect his sanity. While Jean is taken care of by Edith's family, Chimay also develops feelings for Helene and marries her.

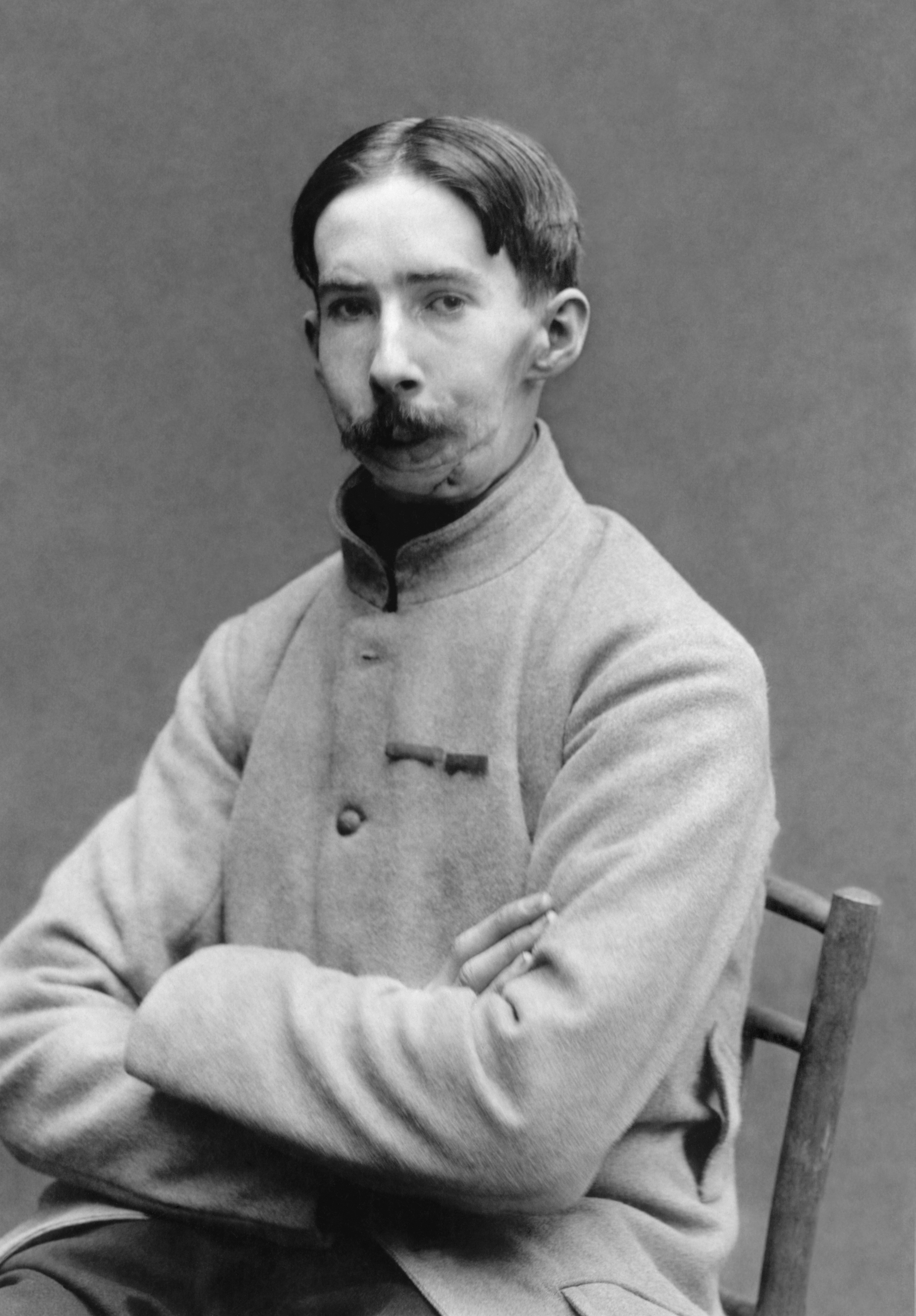
Actual gueules cassées ("broken faces", veterans with facial mutilations) were used for the scenes when the dead soldiers get up from their graves.

Jean regains his sanity and despairs because Europe is heading to another war. He flees to Verdun and dramatically invokes the fallen of all nations. During a supernatural storm, the dead soldiers arise and march to their places of origin. Shocked, Chimay and the world governments abolish war. A text added later notes that the success of the film in 1938 is a proof of how the French people supported peace even in the latest days before World War II.

== Cast ==
- Victor Francen as Jean Diaz
- Line Noro as Edith
- Marie Lou as Flo
- Jean-Max as Henri Chimay
- Paul Amiot as Captain
- Jean-Louis Barrault
- Marcel Delaître as François Laurin
- Renée Devillers as Helene
- André Nox as Leotard
- Georges Rollin as Pierre Fonds
- Georges Saillard as Giles Tenant

== Release ==
=== Home media ===
J'accuse! was released for the first time on Blu-ray and DVD by Olive Films on 15 November 2016.

== Reception ==
Critical reception for J'accuse! has been mostly positive. TV Guide gave the film 3 out of 4 stars, calling it "An excellent antiwar film". Clayton Dillard of Slant Magazine awarded the film 3 out of 5 stars, writing, "More than just an anti-war statement, J’Accuse visualizes long-term memory loss as mankind’s ultimate, and seemingly endless, tragedy."
