= Hercule (film) =

1938 film

- Directed by: Alexander Esway
- Written by: C.M. Alexandre; Carlo Rim
- Produced by: André Aron
- Starring: Fernandel; Gaby Morlay; Pierre Brasseur
- Cinematography: Philippe Agostini; Michel Kelber
- Edited by: Rolf Le Hénaff
- Music by: Manuel Rosenthal
- Production company: Pan Ciné
- Distributed by: Comptoir Français de Productions Cinématographiques
- Release date: 4 March 1938
- Running time: 105 minutes
- Country: France
- Language: French

Hercule is a 1938 French comedy film directed by Alexander Esway and starring Fernandel, Gaby Morlay and Pierre Brasseur. The film's sets were designed by Pierre Schild. Jean Grémillon was the film's original director, but he left shortly after production had begun. A simple fisherman from Provence inherits a Parisian newspaper, but finds some of his new staff are dishonest.

== Main cast ==
- Fernandel as Hercule Maffre
- Gaby Morlay as Juliette Leclerc
- Pierre Brasseur as Bastien
- Henri Crémieux as Bajoux
- Édouard Delmont as Maffre
- Nane Germon as Miette
- Vincent Hyspa as Cahuzac
- Robert Pizani as Le premier frère Riquel
- Henri Poupon as Boeuf
- Jean Tissier as Le troisième frère Riquel
- Charles Dechamps as Le second frère Riquel
- Jules Berry as Vasco

== Bibliography ==
- Oscherwitz, Dayna & Higgins, Maryellen. The A to Z of French Cinema. Scarecrow Press, 2009.
