= Jean Murat =

French actor

- Born: 13 July 1888; Périgueux, Dordogne, France
- Died: 5 January 1968 (aged 79); Aix-en-Provence, Bouches-du-Rhône, France
- Occupation: Actor
- Years active: 1920–1964 (film)

Jean Murat (13 July 1888 in Périgueux – 5 January 1968 in Aix-en-Provence) was a French actor. He was married to the French actress Annabella. He was one of the surviving passengers of the August 1923 Air Union Farman Goliath crash.

== Selected filmography ==
- Sex (1920)
- La Galerie des monstres (1924) as Sveti
- Carmen (1926) as Officier
- Attorney for the Heart (1927) as Dr. Robert Lingh
- The Prey of the Wind (1927) as The husband
- The Duel (1927)
- Valencia (1927) as Count Alfonso de Padilla
- Homesick (1927)
- Escape from Hell (1928) as Erik Ward
- The Carousel of Death (1928)
- Nile Water (1928)
- Masks (1929) as Jonny
- Venus (1929) as Capitaine Franqueville
- The Divine Voyage (1929) as Jacques de Saint-Ermont
- The Night Is Ours (1930) as Henri Brécourt
- The Love Market (1930)
- A Hole in the Wall (1930) as André de Kerdrec
- La Femme d'une nuit (1931) as Jean d'Armont
- The Typist (1931) as Paul Derval
- Captain Craddock (1931) as Captain Craddock
- 77 Rue Chalgrin (1931) as Baron de Cléves
- The Last Blow (1932) as Captain Colbec
- Companion Wanted (1932) as Lord Kingdale
- Narcotics (1932) as Henri Werner
- The Man with the Hispano (1933)
- F.P.1 (French-language version, 1933) as Capitaine Droste
- Mademoiselle Josette, My Woman (1933) as André Ternay
- The Typist Gets Married (1934) as Paul Derval
- The Lady of Lebanon (1934) as Captain Domèvre
- The Crew (1935) as Le capitaine Thélis
- Carnival in Flanders (1935) as Duke of Olivares
- Second Bureau (1935) as Capitaine Benoit
- The Mutiny of the Elsinore (1936) as Jack Pathurst
- Anne-Marie (1936) as Le Penseur
- A Man to Kill (1937) as Capitaine Benoit
- Aloha, le chant des îles (1937) as Capitaine Guy Rungis
- I Was an Adventuress (1938) as Pierre Glorin
- Nights of Princes (1938) as Forestier
- Captain Benoit (1938) as Capitaine Benoit
- Mademoiselle Swing (1942) as Armand de Vinci
- Six Little Girls in White (1942) as Serge Charan
- The Lost Woman (1942) as Jean Dubart
- Christine Gets Married (1946) as Serge
- Lawless Roads (1947) as Florent Lemercier
- Bethsabée (1949) as Colonel
- The Adventurers of the Air (1950) as Portal
- On the Riviera (1951) as Felix Periton
- Rich, Young and Pretty (1951) as Henri Milan
- Alarm in Morocco (1953) as Colonel
- The Night Is Ours (1953) as Colonel Gribaldi
- Royal Affairs in Versailles (1954) as Louvois
- The Big Flag (1954)
- The Red Cloak (1955)
- Lady Chatterley's Lover (1955) as Baron Leslie Winter
- Three Sailors (1957) as Chief of the Secret Service
- The Fox of Paris (1957)
- Ces dames préfèrent le mambo (1957) as Henry Legrand
- Paris Holiday (1958) as Judge
- Les Misérables (1958) as Colonel Georges Pontmercy
- Call Girls of Rome (1960) as General Masetti
- It Happened in Athens (1962) as Pierre de Coubertin
- The Avenger of Venice (1964) as Candiano
