= Simone Berriau =

French actress (1896–1984)

- Born: 21 July 1896; Touques, Calvados, France
- Died: 26 February 1984 (aged 87); Paris, France
- Occupation: Actress
- Years active: 1933–1942 (film); 1943–? (stage)

Simone Berriau (French pronunciation: [simɔn bɛʁjo]; 21 July 1896 – 26 February 1984) was a French stage and film actress. She appeared in more than ten films from 1933 to 1942, after which she moved to theatre pieces and became the director of the Antoine Theatre in Paris; the venue was later renamed in her honour.

== Selected filmography ==
Year	Title	Role	Notes
1933	Ciboulette		
1934	Itto		
1936	The Tender Enemy		
1938	Café de Paris		
1939	Behind the Facade		
1940	Paris-New York		
1940	They Were Twelve Women		
1941	Moulin Rouge		
1942	The Woman I Loved Most		
