= The Postmaster's Daughter =

1938 film directed by Viktor Tourjansky

- Directed by: Viktor Tourjansky
- Written by: Jacques Companéez; Carlo Rim; T.H. Robert
- Based on: The Stationmaster by Alexander Pushkin
- Produced by: Samuel Epstein; Herman Millakowsky
- Starring: Harry Baur; Janine Crispin; George Rigaud
- Cinematography: Charles Bauer; Robert Lefebvre
- Edited by: Christian Gaudin; Jean Oser
- Music by: Michel Michelet
- Production company: Les Films Excelsior
- Distributed by: Lux Compagnie Cinématographique de France
- Release date: 3 March 1938
- Running time: 97 minutes
- Country: France
- Language: French

The Postmaster's Daughter (French: Nostalgie) is a 1938 French historical drama film directed by Viktor Tourjansky and starring Harry Baur, Janine Crispin and George Rigaud. It is an adaptation of Alexander Pushkin's 1831 short story The Stationmaster. The film's sets were designed by the art directors Serge Piménoff and Georges Wakhévitch.

== Cast ==
- Harry Baur as Virine, le maitre de poste
- Janine Crispin as Dounia, sa fille
- George Rigaud as Lieutenant André Minsky
- Charles Dechamps as Colonel Raditch
- René Dary as Captain
- Gina Manès as Olga
- Christiane Ribes as Lisa
- Paul Amiot as Le commissaire
- Jean Clarieux as Batman
- Jean Claudio as Boy
- Hugues de Bagratide as Consumer
- Pierre Labry as Stable Boy
- Palmyre Levasseur as Nanny
- Georges Paulais as Merchant
- Marcel Pérès as Manserv

== Bibliography ==
- Bessy, Maurice & Chirat, Raymond. Histoire du cinéma français: 1935–1939. Pygmalion, 1986.
- Goble, Alan. The Complete Index to Literary Sources in Film. Walter de Gruyter, 1999.
- Crisp, Colin. Genre, Myth and Convention in the French Cinema, 1929–1939. Indiana University Press, 2002.
- Rège, Philippe. Encyclopedia of French Film Directors, Volume 1. Scarecrow Press, 2009.
