= Janine Crispin =

French actress (1911–2001)

- Born: 25 June 1911; Paris, France
- Died: 18 June 2001 (aged 89); Paris, France
- Other name: Jeannine Crepin
- Occupation: Actress
- Years active: 1933–1978 (TV & film)

Janine Crispin (25 June 1911 – 18 June 2001) was a French film and television actress.

== Selected filmography ==
- Court Waltzes (1933)
- High and Low (1933)
- Song of Farewell (1934)
- Second Bureau (1935)
- The Secret of Polichinelle (1936)
- Moutonnet (1936)
- Taras Bulba (1936)
- The Forsaken (1937)
- The Postmaster's Daughter (1938)
- Le Bataillon du ciel (1947)
- At the Grand Balcony (1949)
- Les Rois maudits (1972) as Eliabel Cressay (miniseries)

== Bibliography ==
- Goble, Alan. The Complete Index to Literary Sources in Film. Walter de Gruyter, 1999.
