= Jean-Max =

French actor

- Born: 16 February 1895; Paris, France
- Died: 7 December 1970 (aged 75); Paris, France
- Other name: Jean Max Marie Méhouas
- Occupation: Actor
- Years active: 1921-1961 (film)

Jean-Max (1895–1970) was a French film actor.

== Selected filmography ==
- The Prosecutor Hallers (1930)
- Le cap perdu (1931)
- The Unknown Singer (1931)
- The Darling of Paris (1931)
- Suzanne (1932)
- Once Upon a Time (1933)
- Sapho (1934)
- Pension Mimosas (1935)
- Koenigsmark (1935)
- Second Bureau (1935)
- Les yeux noirs (1935)
- Port Arthur (1936)
- Nitchevo (1936)
- A Man to Kill (1937)
- Men of Prey (1937)
- J'accuse! (1938)
- The Woman Thief (1938)
- I Was an Adventuress (1938)
- Facing Destiny (1940)
- Last Adventure (1942)
- Criminal Brigade (1947)
- The Adventurers of the Air (1950)
- The New Masters (1950)
- Children of Love (1953)
- More Whiskey for Callaghan (1955)

== Bibliography ==
- Goble, Alan. The Complete Index to Literary Sources in Film. Walter de Gruyter, 1999.
