= Final Accord (1938 film) =

1938 film

- Directed by: Douglas Sirk (uncredited); Ignacy Rosenkranz
- Written by: Max Kolpé; Jacques Natanson; Ignacy Rosenkranz
- Produced by: Georges Lourau; Chiel Weissmann; Joseph Weissmann
- Starring: Käthe von Nagy; Jules Berry; George Rigaud
- Cinematography: Michel Kelber
- Edited by: Charles Gaudin; Jean Oser
- Music by: Paul Dessau
- Production companies: France-Suisse Films; Francinex
- Distributed by: Filmsonor Marceau
- Release date: 30 December 1938
- Running time: 95 minutes
- Countries: France; Switzerland
- Language: French

Final Accord (French: Accord final) is a 1938 French-Swiss musical comedy film directed by Douglas Sirk (uncredited) and Ignacy Rosenkranz and starring Käthe von Nagy, Jules Berry and George Rigaud. It was shot at the Epinay Studios in Paris and on location around Montreux in Switzerland. The film's sets were designed by the art director Jacques Krauss.

== Cast ==
- Käthe von Nagy as Hélène Vernier
- Jules Berry as Le baron Larzac
- George Rigaud as Georges Astor
- André Alerme as Fradin
- Raymond Aimos as Le chauffeur de taxi
- Georges Rollin as Paul Lissa
- Jacques Baumer as Le professeur Hennard
- Josette Day as Suzanne Fabre
- Nane Germon as Marie Poupard
- Maurice Baquet as Serge Didot
- Bernard Blier as Mérot
- Yves Brainville as Chenal - l'ami de Georges
- Michel Vitold as Un élève du conservatoire de musique

== Bibliography ==
- Bessy, Maurice & Chirat, Raymond. Histoire du cinéma français: 1935-1939. Pygmalion, 1986.
- Crisp, Colin. Genre, Myth and Convention in the French Cinema, 1929-1939. Indiana University Press, 2002.
- Rège, Philippe. Encyclopedia of French Film Directors, Volume 1. Scarecrow Press, 2009.
