= Théâtre Antoine-Simone Berriau =

Theatre in Paris, France

Théâtre Antoine
- Théâtre des Menus-Plaisirs (1866–1874 • 1877–1879 • 1882–1888); Théâtre des Arts (1874–1876 • 1879–1881); Opéra-Bouffe (1876–1877); Comédie-Parisienne (1881); Théâtre-Libre (1888–1897)
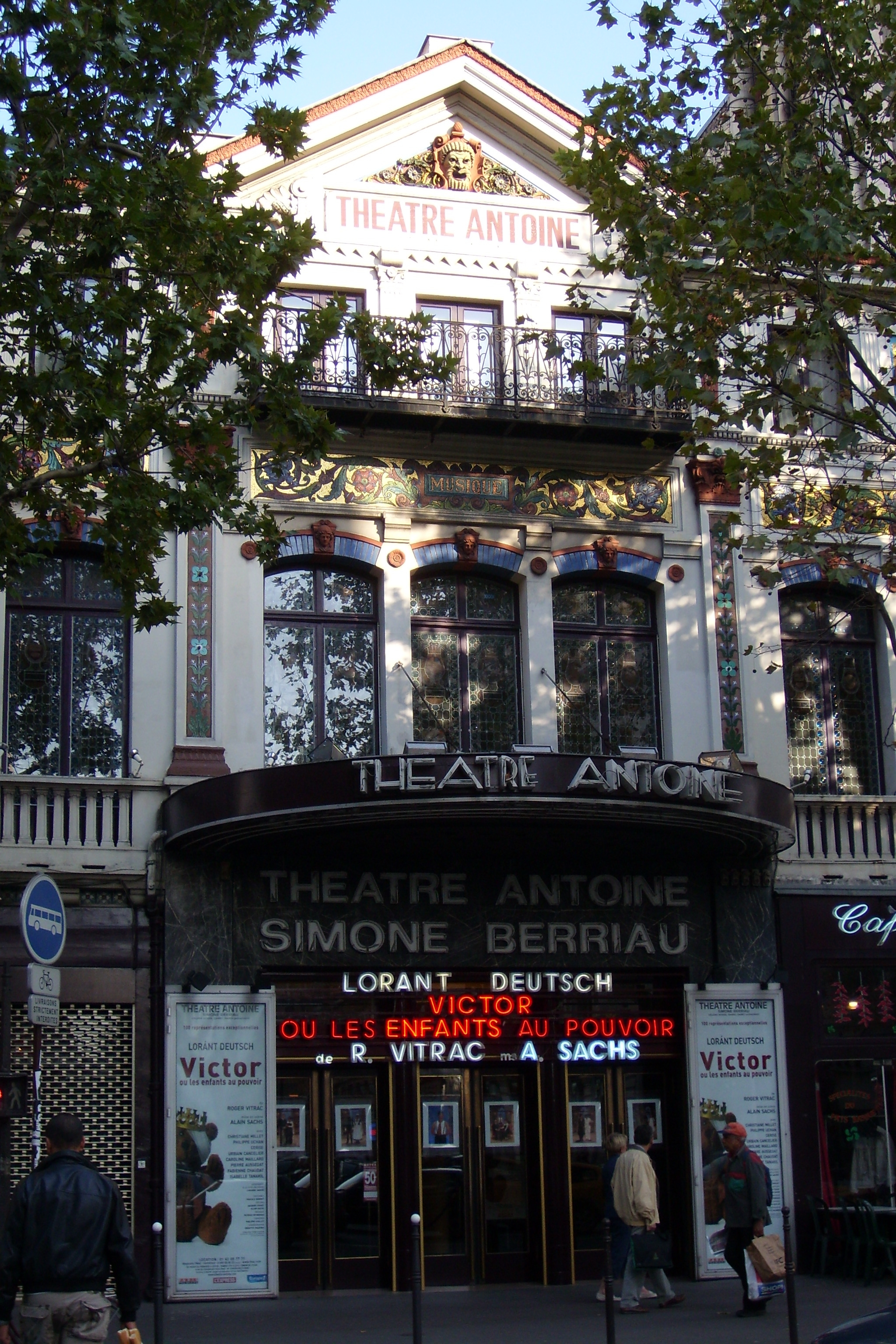
- The Théâtre Antoine in 2007
- Interactive map of Théâtre Antoine
- Address: 14 Boulevard de Strasbourg; Paris
- Coordinates: 48.870558°N 2.355367°E
- Capacity: 780

Construction
- Opened: 1866; 160 years ago

Website
- www.theatre-antoine.com

Théâtre Antoine-Simone Berriau (French pronunciation: [teɑtʁ ɑ̃twan simɔn bɛʁjo]) is a theater located at 14 boulevard de Strasbourg in the 10th arrondissement of Paris.

The 800-seat Italian Style theater was built in the year 1866. It functioned under a variety of names through the years, opening as Théâtre des Menus-Plaisirs ([teɑtʁ de məny plɛziʁ]; 1866–1874, 1877–1879, 1882–1888), then Théâtre des Arts ([teɑtʁ dez‿aʁ]; 1874–1876, 1879–1881), Opéra-Bouffe ([ɔpeʁa buf]; 1876–1877), and the Comédie-Parisienne ([kɔmedi paʁizjɛn]; 1881).

== Théâtre-Libre (1888–1897) and Théâtre-Antoine (1897–1906) ==
In 1888 it became the venue for the Théâtre Libre company of André Antoine. Although short-lived, lasting only eight years, the theater's pioneering naturalism proved extremely influential. Antoine departed in 1894 under financial pressure, the enterprise closed in 1896, but Antoine returned the following year to the renamed Théâtre Antoine with a more deliberately provocative program that lasted until 1906.

== From 1943 onwards ==
The theater now bears the name of actress and director Simone Berriau, who presented the complete dramatic work of Jean-Paul Sartre here beginning in 1943. For instance the first production of his 1951 The Devil and the Good Lord opened here, directed by Louis Jouvet. On her death in 1984 her daughter Helena Bossis took charge; since the death of Bossis in 2008, her husband Daniel Dares has served as director.

== Premieres ==
=== Théâtre des Menus-Plaisirs ===
- 1867: Geneviève de Brabant (revised version) by Jacques Offenbach
- 1883: Les pommes d'or by Edmond Audran
- 1887: La fiancée des Verts-Poteaux by Audran
- 1891: L'oncle Célestin by Audran
- 1892: Article de Paris by Audran
