= Georges Guibourg =

French singer, author, playwright and actor

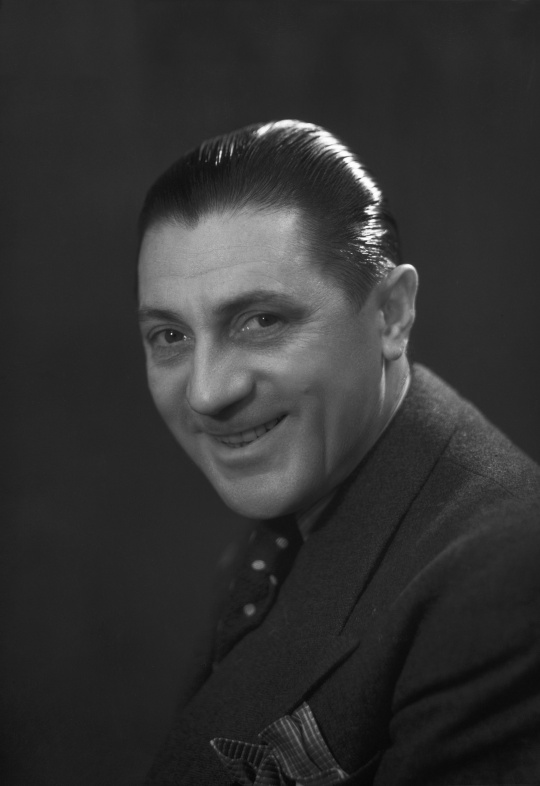
- Guilbourg in 1936
- Born: Mantes-la-Ville, Yvelines, Île-de-France, France
- Died: Bazoches-sur-Guyonne, Yvelines, Île-de-France
- Other names: George Guibourg, alias Georgius, alias Theodore Crapulet
- Occupations: Singer, author, writer, playwright, and actor
- Notable work: 1,500 songs

Georges Guibourg (June 3, 1891 – January 8, 1970) was a French singer, author, writer, playwright, and actor, George Guibourg, alias Georgius, alias Theodore Crapulet, was one of the most popular and versatile performers in Paris for more than 50 years.

Guibourg was born at Mantes-la-Ville, Yvelines, France. He began studying the piano at the age of 11 and at age 16 went to Paris where he performed on stage, singing extracts of traditional operettas and lovesongs. Over the next few years he performed his lovesongs at various concert halls and cabarets and appeared in a musical comedy in Montparnasse.

In the 1920s and 1930s, he became one of the most popular singers of Paris, putting together his own comedy troop, performing at the Moulin Rouge, Bobino, Alhambra Club and the Casino de Paris.

In 1932, he appeared in a motion picture with the comedian Fernandel, and between then and the 1950s he appeared in six films as well as serving as the artistic director of three different theatres. He also wrote a play and several detective novels.

He died at Bazoches-sur-Guyonne, Yvelines, Île-de-France, the author of more than 1,500 songs.
