= À Nous la Liberté =

1931 film directed by René Clair

À nous la liberté
- Directed by: René Clair
- Written by: René Clair
- Produced by: Frank Clifford
- Starring: Henri Marchand; Raymond Cordy; Rolla France; Paul Ollivier; Jacques Shelly
- Cinematography: Georges Périnal
- Edited by: René Le Hénaff
- Music by: Georges Auric
- Distributed by: Films Sonores Tobis; Joseph Burstyn (1954 US re-release)
- Release date: 18 December 1931
- Running time: 104 minutes
- Country: France
- Language: French

À nous la liberté (French pronunciation: [a nu la libɛʁte]), sometimes written as À nous la liberté!, (English: Freedom Forever or Freedom for Us) is a 1931 French musical film directed by René Clair. With a score by Georges Auric, it has more music than any of Clair's other early works. Praised for its use of sound and Academy Award-nominated scenic design, the film has been called Clair's "crowning achievement".

== Plot summary ==
Inmates at a French prison make toy wooden horses at a long table. Émile, one of the prisoners, distracts a guard so his friend, Louis, can steal a hook-shaped tool. That night, the pair escape from their cell. Louis scales the inner wall of the facility using a rope tied to the hook, but Émile is spotted when he tries to follow. Émile throws the rope to Louis and tells him to run for it. Several guards chase Émile, while Louis climbs the outer wall. Panicked, Louis runs into a road and is hit by a bicyclist. He rides off on the man's bicycle and ends up winning a race. Later, he covers up his theft of a small shop by acting as though he was attacked by a thief while the proprietor was out of the room.

Starting as a poor record merchant, Louis is able to work his way up until he is the well-attired and well-mannered head of a business that makes phonographs. The factory is run with great efficiency and the workers, overseen by a strict foreman, toil on an assembly line in an environment reminiscent of the prison from which Louis escaped.

In a field behind the factory, Émile (apparently having been released from prison) wakes from a nap in the grass. The Sun is shining and some flowers sing him a song, but then two policemen come by and arrest him for vagrancy. From his jail cell, he hears music and sees, in an apartment across the street, a woman who appears to be singing while she hangs flowers around a window. Not wanting to be incarcerated any more, Émile tries to hang himself from the prison window, but the bars comes loose, so he escapes instead.

Finding himself below the flower-covered window, Émile pauses to listen to the song, which winds down and stops, revealing to him that it was being played on a phonograph. He turns and sees the woman, Jeanne, standing next to him on the street and goes to say hello, but her uncle kicks Émile and pulls her away. A shopkeeper laughs at Émile and the two argue, which distracts Jeanne's uncle just long enough for Jeanne to make a date with her boyfriend, Paul, before her uncle leads her off to work. Émile finds safety from the shopkeeper in a line that turns out to be for new recruits at Louis' factory. He is about to leave when he discovers Jeanne works there as a secretary, so he sticks around.

On the assembly line, Émile soon falls behind and causes a disruption. Jeanne comes to the factory floor to escape the unwanted advances of the foreman and Émile goes to talk to her. She drops her handkerchief and leaves before he can give it back to her, as the foreman has entered to try to restore order. The assembly line is restarted and Émile is removed from his position. Jeanne's handkerchief gets thrown out a window, so Émile goes after it and winds up being chased by the foreman and a growing number of factory guards, but the chase stops abruptly when everyone stands at attention while Louis passes by. Louis acts as though he does not recognize Émile, though he still agrees to speak privately.

In Louis' office, Louis pulls a gun on Émile and then offers him money to disappear without revealing how they know each other. Émile refuses to extort his friend and sees Jeanne out the window. He wants to go return her handkerchief, but Louis stops him, cutting Émile's wrist in the process. As Louis tends to the wound with his handkerchief, he recalls that he had done similarly during their jailbreak and their friendship is rekindled.

Émile's reappearance helps to get Louis to relax. After a fancy dinner party is broken up, not so much by the waiter spilling dessert on the guests as by Émile and Louis laughing at the situation, the friends throw things at a huge portrait of Louis and get drunk. In the morning, first Émile, and then Louis, are spotted by a man who was in prison with them.

When Émile interrupts a meeting, Louis is annoyed and says he cannot have Émile around the factory, but he softens when Émile says he wants to stay because he is in love. Louis looks up Jeanne's personnel file and discovers her uncle is an accountant at the factory, so he tells the man that his friend wants to marry Jeanne. Thrilled at the prospect of his niece marrying someone so close to wealth, the uncle arranges for Émile and Jeanne to have a date, but Jeanne is unhappy to be engaged to a man with whom she has exchanged only a few words.

At his mansion, Louis is welcomed by a group of men, one of whom is the former inmate who had seen him that morning, who threaten to expose Louis' criminal past unless he agrees to share his status and fortune with them. Meanwhile, Émile and Jeanne, chaperoned by her uncle, sit in awkward silence at a dance hall. Paul watches disapprovingly before he leaves with his date. Jeanne follows them and ends up alone with Émile, who tries to kiss her. She gently extricates herself from his embrace and finds Paul, whose date has abandoned him due to his lack of interest in her. Émile wanders around and, finding Jeanne with Paul, realizes she already has a boyfriend.

After the date, Émile longingly looks up at Jeanne's apartment window while she happily waves to Paul. He realizes he is right outside the jail from which he escaped just as some policemen ask him what he is doing, so he runs away. They chase him to the factory, where he finds Louis, who has locked the group of blackmailers in a vault and is cleaning out his safe before running away. Louis tells the policemen and security guards he has not seen anyone, but, unfortunately, Émile accidentally frees the blackmailers while he is looking for a hiding place. A chase ensues, during which the former inmate manages to get the case Louis loaded with money. Émile escapes, but all of the blackmailers are apprehended. Unbeknownst to anyone but the former inmate, the case full of money was left on the roof when he got caught. Although the police officers do not listen to the blackmailers when they say Louis is an escaped criminal, Louis knows it is only a matter of time before they do.

The next day, Louis speaks at the opening ceremony of a new factory that will be completely automated. He notices a policeman in the audience and announces he has finished his work at the phonograph company and gives his factories to the employees. The wind picks up and blows the money off the roof, and the crowd runs after it. Louis uses the distraction to sneak away from the police.

With the factory running itself, the workers, Jeanne and Paul among them, spend their days in leisure. Émile and Louis, however, are now singing for spare change and traveling on foot. When a fancy car drives by, reminding Louis of how he used to live, Émile kicks him in the butt and, happily, they head down the road together.

== Cast ==
- Henri Marchand as Emile
- Raymond Cordy as Louis
- Rolla France as Jeanne
- Paul Ollivier as Jeanne's Uncle
- Jacques Shelly as Paul
- André Michaud as The Foreman
- Germaine Aussey as Maud (Louis' girlfriend)
- Léon Lorin as The Deaf Old Man
- William Burke as The Former Inmate
- Vincent Hyspa as The Old Speaker
- Alexander D'Arcy as The Gigolo (uncredited)

== Production ==
Along with his two first sound films, Sous les toits de Paris (1930) and Le Million (1931), À nous la liberté shows Clair continuing to experiment with the possibilities of sound film. At one point, the image of a flower, in combination with an unseen voice, leads the viewer to think the flower is singing. Once this is accepted, the viewer is able to accept that a chorus of flowers is singing when Émile views a window from his jail cell. As he does with narrative, Clair reveals the truth slowly and in a circuitous way, so as to produce comedy and satire; in this case, by first suggesting the flowers are singing, and then that Jeanne is singing, when in fact it is a phonograph—revealed only because it runs down.

An aural flashback occurs when Émile re-encounters Louis, and a small argument results in Émile getting cut. As Louis bandages the cut, the soundtrack plays the non-musical marching of the prisoners (who wore wooden clogs).

Many sound effects are achieved, not through natural sound, but through Auric's musical score. In the phonograph factory, the "sound" of assembly line mechanization was depicted musically (using xylophones, among other instruments). There are several other passages, such as when Louis keys in the numbers to retrieve the profiles of Jeanne and her uncle, where the music supplies the only accompanying sound.

== Themes ==
The film comments on society by depicting industrial working conditions as not much different from being in prison. DVD Verdict's Barrie Maxwell adds that the film depicts "a France oblivious to all going on around it, as portrayed by the sequence in which an aging French politician drones on to his audience about justice and liberty and patriotism, while the audience has long since lost interest, preferring instead to concentrate on chasing money that has accidentally fallen out of a bag and is now blowing in the wind."

Critic Michael Atkinson views the film as "expressly dismissive of both Stalinism and industrial dehumanization (Liberté's world is a seamless commingling of both)" and argues that "Clair's film holds only the anarchistic principle of liberty sacred."

== Release and reception ==
=== Initial reviews ===
À nous la liberté was both critically and commercially successful. Mordaunt Hall of The New York Times argued that its humor "is provocative of thought", and praised "the cleverly designed settings for the scenes in both the prison and the factory. This angle of the production is extraordinarily thorough, every detail having received most careful attention."

=== Chaplin controversy ===
The film became embroiled in controversy following the release of Charlie Chaplin's Modern Times (1936), which bore some similarities to this film, such as the conveyor belt gags. In the end, instead of going to court, the two parties reached a settlement, but the whole episode lasted around a decade. Chaplin maintained that he had never seen or heard of À nous la liberté, as did everyone else at his studio.

René Clair himself was never a part of the case, and was actually quite embarrassed by it, since he had great admiration for Chaplin, to whom he stated all filmmakers were in debt. He said on multiple occasions that he would be honored if one of his films had inspired Chaplin.

=== 1950 version ===
In 1950, Clair re-released the film, deleting two scenes:

1. The scene in which the flowers sing to Émile after he wakes up in a field.
2. The sequence depicting Émile's date with Jeanne. (In some countries, this sequence had already been deleted from the film at the time of its initial release.)

=== Modern reception ===
Review aggregator Rotten Tomatoes reports 100% approval of À nous la liberté based on 18 reviews, with an average rating of 8.3/10. Jonathan Rosenbaum wrote that the film's "proletarian plot (two convicts go free, one becoming a tramp, the other acquiring a phonograph factory) makes it a period piece in the best sense." Michael Atkinson considers it to be Clair's "loveliest and most lyrical film", and wrote that the work is "filthy with formal élan, wild sound [...] and choreographed movement, and if anything [it has] gained an antique daydreaminess with the years." In The Routledge Encyclopedia of Films, À nous la liberté is described as a landmark in film comedy for "its deft use of sound and its pioneering production design", and as a work which anticipated the films of Jacques Tati in its satire of modernization.

== See also ==
- Entr'acte (film)
