= The Ladies in the Green Hats =

The Ladies in the Green Hats may refer to:

- The Ladies in the Green Hats (1929 film), a French silent comedy film
- The Ladies in the Green Hats (1937 film), a French comedy drama film
- The Ladies in the Green Hats (1949 film), a French comedy film
