= Pola Illéry =

Romanian-American actress and singer (1909–1993)

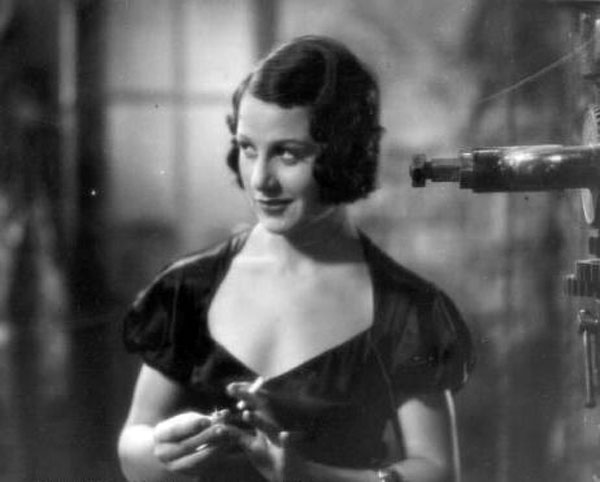
- Pola Illéry, 1930s
- Born: Paula Iliescu; 18 December 1909; Corabia, Kingdom of Romania
- Died: 19 October 1993 (aged 83); Palos Verdes, California, U.S.
- Occupations: Actress, singer
- Years active: 1928–1938
- Spouses: Charles H. Greiner (m. 1946; died 1947): James E. Gibson

Paula Iliescu Gibson (18 December 1909 – 19 October 1993) known professionally as Pola Illéry, was a Romanian-American actress and singer, best known for her appearances in early French film, and of the latter after emigrating to the United States, in Hollywood films, best known for her portrayal of vamps, she appeared in both silent film and talkie films, in a decade long screen career between 1928 and 1938.

== Life and career ==
Born into a middle-class Jewish family in Corabia, Romania on 18 December 1909, as Paula Iliescu, she changed her name to "Pola" in tribute to the Polish actress and singer Pola Negri.

Illéry made her screen debut appearing in French films in the late-1920s and continuing in roles until the end of the 1930s. She appeared as the lead in René Clair's musical comedy Under the Roofs of Paris (1930). She also played the lead in Parada Paramount, the Romanian-language version of Paramount on Parade (1930), which was made in Paris by Paramount Pictures. She is believed to have made her last film appearance's in 1938.

Illéry married a United States Army Air Corps Major Charles H. Greiner (1914–1947) during World War II and moved to the United States with him on May 26, 1946. The marriage only lasted a few months before he was killed in an accident. She worked for the American Red Cross as a nurse during the war and took up American citizenship in 1946. She later married James Gibson and the couple moved to Palos Verdes, California, where Illéry lived for the rest of her life.

Illéry died on 19 October 1993, at the age of 83.

== Selected filmography ==
- Captain Fracasse (1929)
- Illusions (1930)
- Under the Roofs of Paris (1930)
- The Man in Evening Clothes (1931)
- Bastille Day (1933)
- In the Land of the Sun (1934)
- Street Without a Name (1934)
- The Guardian Angel (1934)
