= Gaston Modot =

French actor

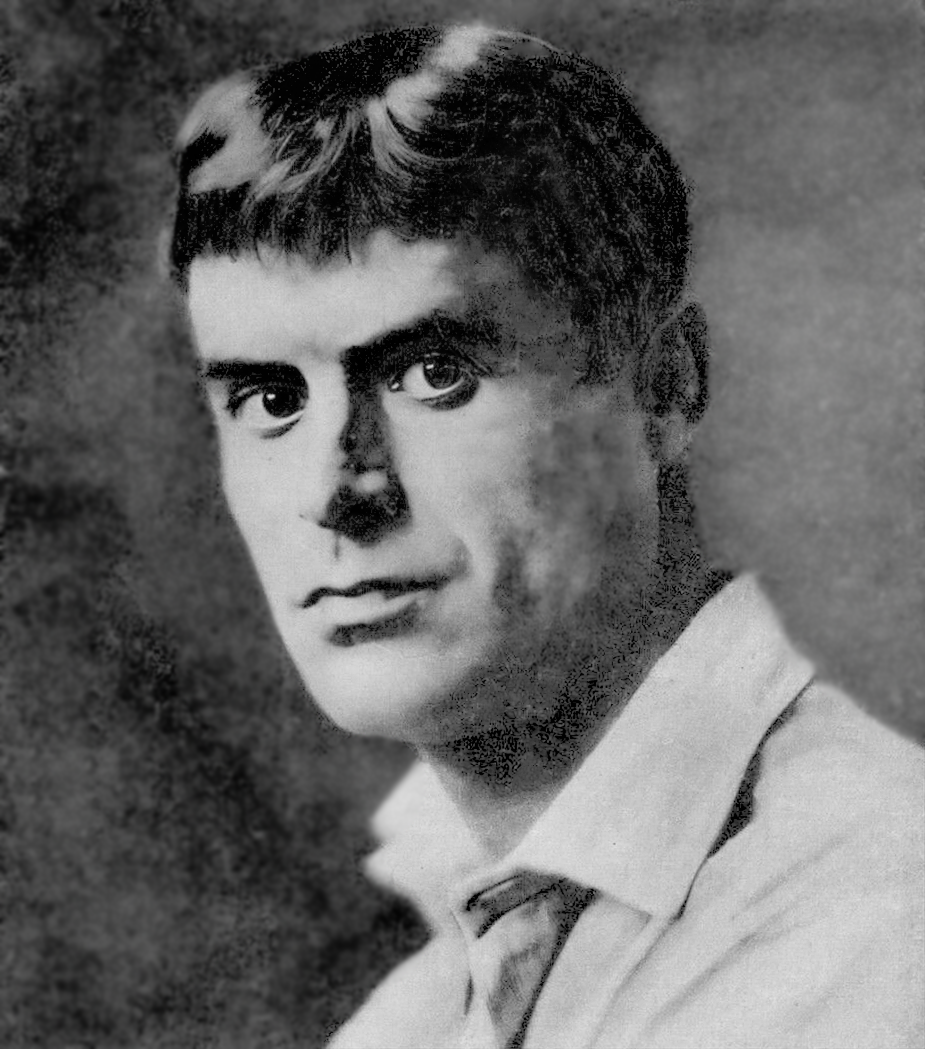
- Gaston Modot in 1923
- Born: 31 December 1887; Paris, French Third Republic
- Died: 20 February 1970 (aged 82); Le Raincy, France
- Years active: 1909–1962

Gaston Modot (31 December 1887 – 20 February 1970) was a French actor. For more than 50 years he performed for the cinema working with a number of great French directors.

== Biography ==
Modot lived in Montmartre and was a painter at the beginning of the 20th century, where he met fellow artists Picasso and Modigliani. In 1909 he started his career with Gaumont and for the following 20 years he covered all silent film genres. In 1917 he was the main actor in Abel Gance's Mater dolorosa. He played in Germaine Dulac and Louis Delluc's avant-garde films La fête espagnole (1919) and Fièvre (1921). With Max Linder, Modot played in Abel Gance's Au secours! (1924). Towards the end of the 1920s he performed in German-French co-productions.

He is still famous for his role of The Man in Luis Buñuel's L'Âge d'Or (1930).

He had his first role in a sound film with René Clair's Sous les toits de Paris (1930). He and Jean Gabin are main characters in Julien Duvivier's Pépé le Moko (1937). He acted in the Jean Renoir classics La grande illusion and La règle du jeu as well as the three-hour poetic film Les enfants du paradis (1945) for Marcel Carné.

In 1962 Modot ended his acting career. He had acted in more than 100 films.

== Films ==
- Mater Dolorosa (1917)
- La zone de la mort (1917)
- La fête espagnole (1919)
- Fièvre (1921)
- Mathias Sandorf (1921)
- The Mysteries of Paris (1922)
- Au secours! (1924)
- Heart of an Actress (1924)
- Le Miracle des loups (1924)
- Carmen (1926)
- The Lady of Lebanon (1926)
- The City of a Thousand Delights (1927)
- Secrets of the Orient (1928)
- Mademoiselle's Chauffeur (1928)
- Change of Heart (1928)
- Le navire des hommes perdus (1929)
- The Green Monocle (1929)
- Phantoms of Happiness (1929)
- My Daughter's Tutor (1929)
- The Ship of Lost Souls (1929)
- Saint Joan the Maid (1929)
- L'Âge d'Or (1930)
- Under the Roofs of Paris (1930)
- About an Inquest (1931)
- Under the Leather Helmet (1932)
- Fantômas (1932)
- Colomba (1933)
- Bastille Day (1933)
- Crainquebille (1934)
- Lucrezia Borgia (1935)
- The Imberger Mystery (1935)
- Bux the Clown (1935)
- Pépé le Moko (1937)
- The Forsaken (1937)
- White Cargo (1937)
- Grand Illusion (1937)
- Street of Shadows (1937)
- The Chess Player (1938)
- Sirocco (1938)
- The Time of the Cherries (1938)
- Coral Reefs (1939)
- The Rules of the Game (1939)
- At Your Command, Madame (1942)
- White Patrol (1942)
- The Trump Card (1942)
- Children of Paradise (1945)
- Lessons in Conduct (1946)
- Antoine et Antoinette (1947)
- The Cupboard Was Bare (1948)
- The Cavalier of Croix-Mort (1948)
- Eternal Conflict (1948)
- Daybreak (1949)
- Passion for Life (1949)
- La beauté du diable (1949)
- The Perfume of the Lady in Black (1949)
- Monsieur Octave (1951)
- Casque d'or (1952)
- Meeting in Paris (1956)
- Elena and Her Men (1956)
- The Lovers (1958)
- Le testament du Docteur Cordelier (1959)
- Le Diable et les Dix Commandements (1962)
