= Imaginary voyage (disambiguation) =

Imaginary voyage is a narrative genre, a fictional travel narrative.

Imaginary Voyage may also refer to:

- Imaginary Voyage, 1976 album by Jean-Luc Ponty
- The Imaginary Voyage, 1926 French silent comedy film
