= The Ghost Train (play) =

Play by Arnold Ridley

The Ghost Train is a stage comedy-thriller, written in 1923 by the English actor and playwright Arnold Ridley.

The story centres upon the social interaction of a group of railway passengers who have been stranded at a remote rural station overnight, and are increasingly threatened by a latent external force, with a denouement ending.

The play ran for over a year in its original sold-out London theatrical run, and is regarded as a minor modern classic.

== Background ==
Ridley was inspired to write the play after becoming stranded overnight at Mangotsfield railway station (a now abandoned station, on the defunct Midland Railway Company's Bristol and Gloucester Railway line), during a rail journey through the Gloucestershire countryside. The deserted station's atmosphere, combined with hearing the non-stop Bath to Gloucester express using an adjacent curved diversionary main line to by-pass Mangotsfield, which created the illusion of a train approaching, passing through and departing, but not being seen, impressed itself upon Ridley's senses. The play took him only a week to write. After a première in Brighton, it transferred to London's St Martin's Theatre, where – despite unenthusiastic reviews from the theatre press critics – it played to sell-out audiences from November 1925 to March 1927.

== Original cast ==
- Caleb Porter as Saul Hodgkin
- G. H. Mulcaster as Richard Winthrop
- Edith Saville as Elsie
- Basil Howes as Charles Murdoch
- Edna Davies as Peggy Murdoch
- Gladys Ffoliott as Miss Bourne
- Frederick T. Cooper as Teddy Deakin
- Mary Clare as Julia Price
- Neville Brook as Herbert Price
- Vincent Holman as John Stirling
- Walter Pemberton as Jackson
- Wilfred Langley as Smith

Changes to the cast during the run included Sydney Fairbrother (from June 1926) as Miss Bourne, succeeded in the role by Connie Ediss in November 1926.

Ridley himself played Saul Hodgkin, the station master, in several productions over many years. He told The Guardian in 1976 that when he first played the part he had to make up carefully to look old enough, but latterly "I had a job to make myself look young enough".

== Plot summary ==
The plot revolves around a party of assorted railway travellers who find themselves stranded in the waiting room of an isolated country station in the evening. The station master tries to persuade them to leave the site as he is closing the station for the night. They refuse to leave, citing the lack of alternative accommodation for several miles around. He warns them of the supernatural danger of a spectral passenger train, the ghost of one that fatally wrecked in the locality several years before, that sometimes haunts the line at night, bringing death to all who set eyes upon it. Incredulous of his story, they still refuse to leave, and he departs leaving them facing a night at the station.

The main body of the play is then taken up with the interaction of the varied assortment of the passengers: strangers thrown randomly together in the odd social intimacy of happenstance that rail travel involves, representing a cross-section of English 1920s society. There are a variety of escalating dramatic incidents combined with a heightening tension as the latent threat of the spectral train's possible appearance is ultimately dramatically realised, bringing disaster and death to the group as foretold.

The story then resolves from a socio-suspense drama into a spy adventure, when it is revealed that the "ghost train" is quite real and is being used by communist revolutionaries to smuggle machine guns from the Soviet Union into England, and the story of the "ghost-train" has been concocted to scare potential witnesses away from the scene of the operation. A British Government secret agent incognito in the stranded passengers' midst is then revealed; the agent confronts the revolutionary gang in a gun battle on the station, and the revolutionaries' covert operation is defeated.

== Production ==
In its first run in London, for its climactic moment elaborate special-effects utilizing visual and audio devices were used to create the sensation of a train passing close by on the stage at high speed, including garden-rollers running over wooden laths, thunder sheets, etc. Reviewing the premiere in The Manchester Guardian, Ivor Brown wrote, "the gentleman in charge of 'Noises off' becomes at times the protagonist, ... he can make a noise so like a train that he might impose on the station master of a terminus; meanwhile, he can throw in a hurricane, as it were, with the other hand."

== Film and broadcast adaptations ==
- Possibly the first film to be based on the play's central premise is the American silent The Phantom Express (1925), although there is no acknowledgement of this in that production's credits.
- The first credited filmed version was a German-British silent film co-production the Ghost Train in 1927.
- The next film, starring comedian Jack Hulbert, was The Ghost Train (1931), survives only in an incomplete form.
- The Phantom Express (1932) made in Hollywood the next year bears close similarity to the theme, but the play is unacknowledged in its credits.
- In 1933 a Hungarian film The Ghost Train starring Marika Rökk
- French film A Train in the Night with Dolly Davis in 1934.
- In 1937, another version was produced The Ghost Train, starring Clifford Benn, John Counsell, and Hugh Dempster.
- Oh, Mr Porter! (1937) starring Will Hay, was adapted from the play.
- On 28 December 1937, the BBC broadcast a forty-minute performance of the play directed by John Counsell. The Times review of the broadcast stating: "Once more it was very effective, the wind-machine working overtime from the start, doors opening spontaneously as on the best-ordered stages, bells tinkling ominously ... and an excellent train flying madly by beyond the waiting-room windows."
- In 1939, a filmed version was produced in the Netherlands, De Spooktrein.
- The play was reprised and adapted during World War II and remade as The Ghost Train (1941), starring Arthur Askey as Tommy Gander and Richard Murdoch as Teddy Deakin. The communist villains of the original production were replaced by Nazi fifth columnists.
- In 1951, a vinyl recording of the play was produced and commercially released in England by Decca Records (Release catalogue No.LK4040), starring Claude Hulbert in the role of Teddy Deakin (whose brother Jack had played the role 20 years earlier in a cinema release), with Arnold Ridley (the author of the play) as the Station Master.
- George Posford and Eric Maschwitz collaborated on Happy Holiday (1954), a musical version of the play.
- A German television version of the play, Der Geisterzug, was produced in 1957.
- A film was made in Denmark, Spogelsestoget Ghost Train International (1976).
- A radio version of The Ghost Train, adapted by Shaun McKenna, directed by Marion Nancarrow and starring Adam Godley as Teddy Deakin, was broadcast on BBC Radio 4 in January 1998. It has subsequently been repeated on BBC Radio 7 in 2008, 2009, 2010 and on BBC Radio 4 Extra in 2011 and most recently on 3 January 2015.
- An audio version of the play was recorded by Fantom Films at the 'Oxygen Rooms' in Birmingham in 2010, directed/produced by Dexter O'Neill.

== Books ==
A novel based upon the play The Ghost Train was published in 1927.

== Opera ==
A chamber opera based upon the play, The Ghost Train, debuted at the Carolina Chamber Music Festival in New Bern, North Carolina, US, in September 2012, scored by Paul Crabtree for six singers and an instrumental ensemble. In February 2016, it was performed by the Peabody Chamber Opera in the roundhouse of the B&O Railroad Museum in Baltimore, Maryland.
