= Tingeltangel =

Tingeltangel may refer to:

- Tingeltangel (film), 1922 German silent film
- Tingel-Tangel (1927 film), Austrian silent film
- Tingel-Tangel (1930 film), German film
