= Annabella (actress) =

French actress (1907–1996)

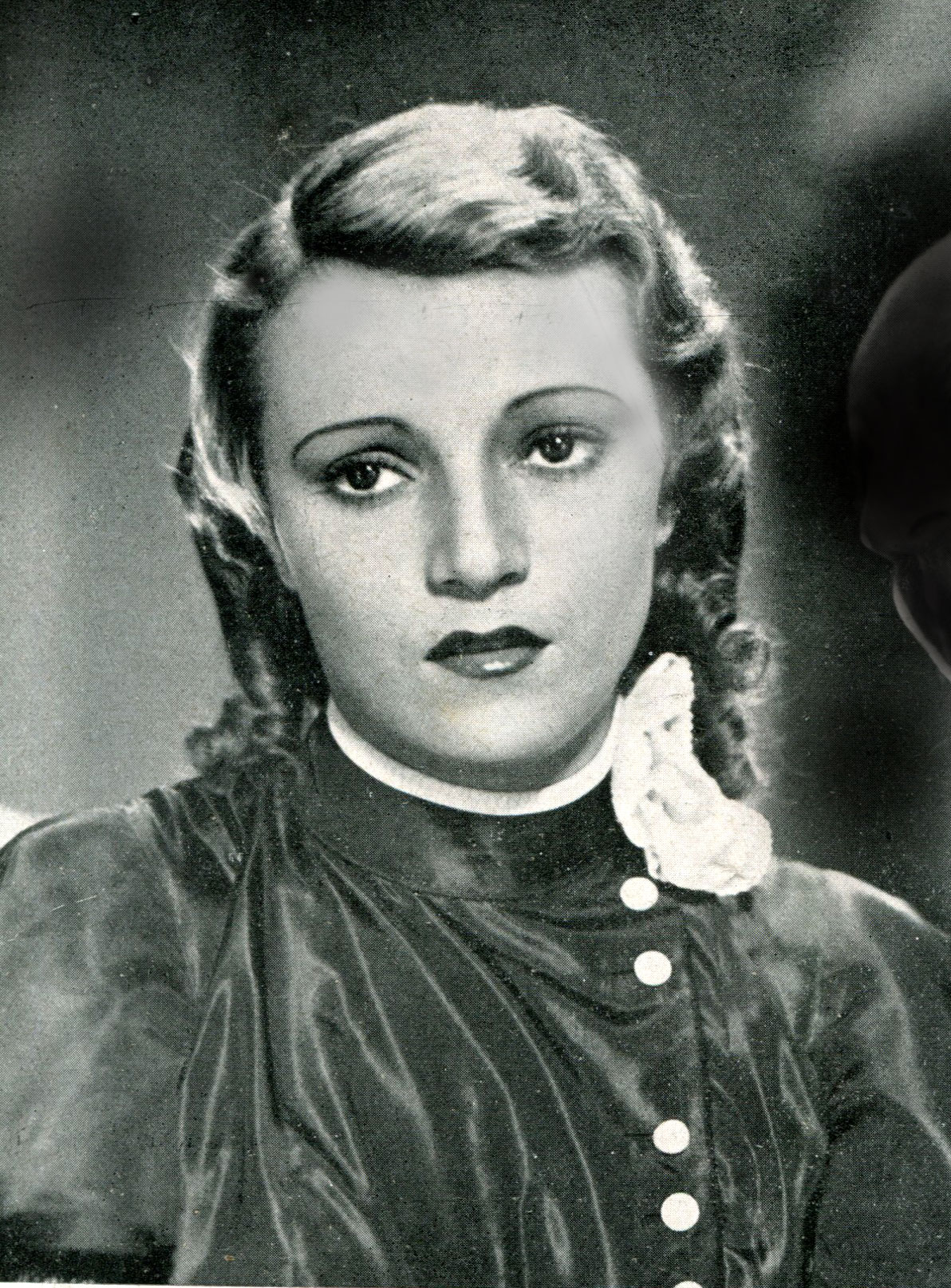
- Annabella in 1934
- Born: Suzanne Georgette Charpentier; 14 July 1907; Paris, France
- Died: 18 September 1996 (aged 89); Neuilly-sur-Seine, France
- Resting place: Passy Cemetery in Haute-Savoie, France
- Occupation: Actress
- Years active: 1927–1954
- Spouses: Albert Sorre (m. 1930; div. 1932) Jean Murat (m. 1934; div. 1938) Tyrone Power (m. 1939; div. 1948)
- Children: 1

Annabella (born Suzanne Georgette Charpentier, 14 July 1907 – 18 September 1996) was a French actress who appeared in 46 films from 1927 to 1952, including some Hollywood films during the late 1930s and 1940s.

== Life and career ==
Annabella was born in Paris, France to Paul Camille Charpentier and Alice Celie Marie Saillard or Gaillord. Paul Charpentier was the managing director of the Journal des Voyages. With Nicolas Benoit, he was one of the founders of the Scouts of France (EDF) in 1911.

Annabella's chance to enter films came when her father entertained a film producer, who gave her a small part in Abel Gance's classic Napoléon (1927). She was not critically acclaimed until she starred in René Clair's Le Million (1931), and over the following decade, she established herself as one of France's popular cinema actresses. For Veille d'armes (1935), she won the Volpi Cup for Best Actress at the Venice Film Festival in 1936.

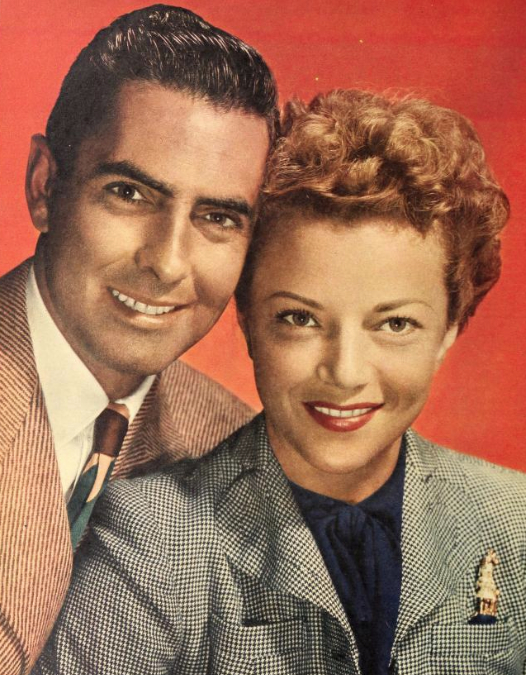
Annabella with Tyrone Power, 1946. They were married in 1939 and divorced in 1948.

She was cast as the female lead in the British-made film Wings of the Morning (1937) with Henry Fonda. Under contract to 20th Century Fox, she traveled to America and appeared in Suez (1938) with Loretta Young and Tyrone Power. Her romance with Power was widely reported by movie magazines of the day. Darryl F. Zanuck, movie mogul at 20th Century Fox, did not want his matinee idol married. He offered Annabella a multi-movie deal that would take her overseas. She refused to leave Power, and on completion of Suez, she returned to France to obtain a divorce from her then-husband Jean Murat. She and Power married on 23 April 1939. The two honeymooned in Rome. Within a few months, Annabella and Power had again flown to Europe to bring Annabella's mother back to live in their home, and her father and brother stayed behind. Her brother was shot and killed by the Nazis. Annabella made a return trip to bring her daughter Anne from France to live with them. Power adopted Anne before leaving for service in the United States Marine Corps in August 1942. Anne Power later married actor Oskar Werner.

Darryl F. Zanuck, angry with her for marrying his top box-office star, did not cast her in movies despite Annabella's contract with 20th Century-Fox. Annabella was also not lent to other studios. She and Power appeared together in the play Liliom in New Haven, Connecticut. While Power was away during his war service, Annabella appeared in Blithe Spirit in Chicago. On Broadway, she received excellent notices for her work in the play Jacobowsky and the Colonel, directed by Elia Kazan, in 1944. Annabella also embarked on an affair with author Roald Dahl; she had refused to give Power a divorce, and her marriage was strained. Dahl told his wife Liccy that it was an intense and passionate relationship during which Dahl learned a lot about sex from the actress.

When Power returned from the war, the couple decided to try to make their marriage work once again.

Annabella again worked in films, playing the female lead in 13 Rue Madeleine (1947) with James Cagney. She and Power divorced in 1948, and Annabella returned to France. She appeared in film director José Luis Sáenz de Heredia's Spanish version of Don Juan (1950), and her final film was released in 1952. After a 1954 television appearance in the American series Suspense, she retired.

Annabella and Tyrone Power remained very close, and after his divorce from Linda Christian, he attempted to reconcile with her, confessing that in giving her up, he had made a terrible mistake. However, Annabella refused. Power informed her that he would not take the elevator to leave her apartment, but the stairs, in case she changed her mind and called him back. She did not.

Annabella died in 1996 after suffering a heart attack in Neuilly-sur-Seine, France, aged 89, and was interred in Passy Cemetery in Haute-Savoie (France).

== Filmography ==
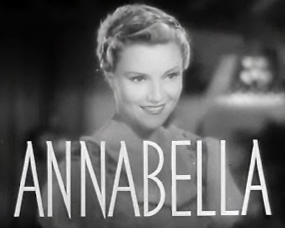
Annabella in Bridal Suite (1939)

Year	Title	Role	Notes
1927	Napoléon	Violine Fleuri	
1928	Misdeal	Flora Lévigné	
1929	Trois jeunes filles nues		
1930	La Maison de la Fléche	Betty Harlowe	
1930	Barcarolle d'amour		
1931	Le Million	Beatrice	
1931	His Highness Love	Annette Wéber	
1931	About an Inquest	Greta Bienert	
1931	Romance à l'inconnue		
1931	Un soir de rafle		
1932	Spring Shower	Szabó Mária	
1932	Companion Wanted	Solange Pascaud	
1932	A Son from America	Dorette	
1933	The Battle		
1933	Sonnenstrahl		
1933	Gardez le sourire		
1933	Bastille Day	Anna	
1933	Mademoiselle Josette, My Woman	Josette	
1934	Caravane		
1934	Moscow Nights	Natacha Kovrine	
1935	La Bandera		
1935	Variety	Jeanne	
1935	Variétés		
1935	The Crew		
1935	Veille d'armes	Jeanne de Corlaix	
1936	Anne-Marie	Anne-Marie	
1937	Wings of the Morning	Young Marie/Maria	
1937	Dinner at the Ritz	Ranie Racine	
1937	The Citadel of Silence	Viana	
1937	Under the Red Robe	Lady Marguerite of Foix	
1938	The Baroness and the Butler	Baroness Katrina Marissey	
1938	Suez	Toni Pellerin	
1938	Hôtel du Nord	Renée	
1939	Bridal Suite	Luise Anzengruber	
1943	Tonight We Raid Calais	Odette Bonnard	
1943	Bomber's Moon	Alexandra "Alec" Zorich	
1947	13 Rue Madeleine	Suzanne de Beaumont	
1948	Eternal Conflict	Florence dite Lili	
1949	Last Love	Hélène Fontenay	
1950	Don Juan	Lady Ontiveras	
1950	The Man Who Returns from Afar	Fanny de la Bossière	
1952	The Floor Burns	Mari Luz Hurtado	
