= The Last Billionaire =

1934 film by René Clair

- Directed by: René Clair
- Written by: René Clair
- Produced by: Bernard Natan
- Starring: Max Dearly; Marthe Mellot; Renée Saint-Cyr
- Cinematography: Rudolph Maté; Louis Née
- Edited by: Jean Pouzet; Louisette Hautecoeur
- Music by: Maurice Jaubert
- Production company: Pathé-Natan
- Distributed by: Pathé-Natan
- Release date: 17 October 1934
- Running time: 92 minutes
- Country: France
- Language: French

The Last Billionaire (French: Le dernier milliardaire) is a 1934 French comedy film directed by René Clair and starring Max Dearly, Marthe Mellot and Renée Saint-Cyr. The film is based on a fictional small European kingdom which is on the verge of going broke.

It was shot at the Joinville Studios in Paris. The film's sets were designed by the art directors Lucien Aguettand and Lucien Carré. It was the last film Clair made in France until 1947, as he moved to Britain and then the United States.

== Cast ==
- Max Dearly as Banco
- Marthe Mellot as Queen of Casinario
- Renée Saint-Cyr as Princess Isabelle
- Jean Sinoël as Prime Minister
- Charles Redgie as Crown Prince Nicolas
- Marcel Carpentier as Detective Brown
- Paul Ollivier as Chamberlain
- Raymond Cordy as Valet
- José Noguero as Bandleader
- Raymond Aimos as Le mendiant
- Christian Argentin as Le ministre des finances
- Jean Aymé as Un ministre
- Eddy Debray as Un ministre

== Bibliography ==
- Dudley Andrew. Mists of Regret: Culture and Sensibility in Classic French Film. Princeton University Press, 1995.
