= The Phantom of the Moulin Rouge =

1925 film by René Clair

- Directed by: René Clair
- Written by: René Clair; Walter Schlee (novel)
- Produced by: Rene Fernand
- Starring: Georges Vaultier; Sandra Milovanoff; Paul Ollivier
- Cinematography: Jimmy Berliet; Louis Chaix
- Edited by: René Clair
- Production company: Films René Fernand
- Release date: 13 March 1925
- Running time: 70 minutes
- Country: France
- Languages: Silent; French intertitles

The Phantom of the Moulin Rouge (French: Le fantôme du Moulin-Rouge) is a 1925 French silent comedy fantasy film (made in 1924), directed by René Clair and starring Albert Préjean, Sandra Milovanoff and Paul Ollivier. It was based on a novel by Walter Schlee. The film's sets were designed by Robert Gys.

== Plot ==
Julien Boissel is engaged to marry Yvonne, but her diplomat father is against it. Her father is being blackmailed by a corrupt newspaper publisher named Gauthier, who states he will surrender the incriminating evidence he has if the old man will allow him to marry Yvonne. To save her father from a scandal, Yvonne agrees to marry the blackmailer.

A depressed Julien encounters a mesmerist named Dr. Window at the famed Moulin-Rouge nightclub, and he allows the doctor to experiment on him with his mesmeric powers. Julien's spirit is freed from his corporeal body and he goes on a mischievous spree around Paris, causing a string of humorous and frightening occurrences. The police come across Julien's body while he is out of it and believe he is dead, and Dr. Window is charged with the murder.

Julien discovers an autopsy is scheduled to be performed on his "corpse", and if this happens, his spirit will never be able to reenter it. Julien manages to get the incriminating evidence away from Gauthier and deliver it to Yvonne, then returns to his body just moments before the time of the proposed autopsy. Dr. Window is exonerated when Julien's corpse returns to life, and Julien ends up with Yvonne.

== Cast ==
- Georges Vaultier as Julien Boissel, the Phantom
- Sandra Milovanoff as Yvonne Vincent
- Maurice Schutz as Victor Vincent, Yvonne's father
- Paul Ollivier as Dr. Window
- José Davert as Gauthier, the publisher/ blackmailer
- Madeleine Rodrigue as Jacqueline
- Albert Préjean as Jean Degland, reporter

== Bibliography ==
- Celia McGerr. René Clair. Twayne Publishers, 1980.
