= Mademoiselle's Chauffeur =

1928 film

- Directed by: Henri Chomette
- Written by: Henri Chomette
- Starring: Dolly Davis; Jim Gérald; Alice Tissot
- Cinematography: Alphonse Gibory; Henri Gondois
- Production company: Argus Film
- Distributed by: Films Armor
- Release date: 16 March 1928
- Country: France
- Languages: Silent; French intertitles

Mademoiselle's Chauffeur (French: Le chauffeur de Mademoiselle) is a 1928 French silent comedy film directed by Henri Chomette and starring Dolly Davis, Jim Gérald and Alice Tissot.

== Plot ==
In this French comedy, Dolly Davis plays the role of "Dolly". Dolly, a mannequin used by dressmakers, marries penniless artist Albert Prejean, but they soon learn that two cannot live as cheaply as one. Dolly goes to see her rich, misogynistic aunt Alice Tissot in the hopes of raising some much-needed money.

== Cast ==
- Dolly Davis as Dolly
- Jim Gérald as Jim
- Alice Tissot as Miss Clarence
- Paul Ollivier as Le baron Paul
- Albert Préjean as Jean
- Marise Maia as Marie
- Nicolas Redelsperger as John
- Gaston Modot
- Pâquerette
- André Roanne

== Bibliography ==
- Connelly, Robert B. The Silents: Silent Feature Films, 1910-36, Volume 40, Issue 2. December Press, 1998.
- Krautz, Alfred . International Directory of Cinematographers Set and Costume Designers in Film: France. Saur, 1983.
- Rège, Philippe. Encyclopedia of French Film Directors, Volume 1. Scarecrow Press, 2009.
