= Bastille Day (1933 film) =

1933 film

- Film poster
- French: Quatorze Juillet
- Directed by: René Clair
- Written by: René Clair
- Produced by: Roger Le Bon
- Starring: Annabella; George Rigaud; Raymond Cordy
- Cinematography: Georges Périnal
- Edited by: René Le Hénaff
- Music by: Maurice Jaubert
- Production company: Films Sonores Tobis
- Distributed by: Films Sonores Tobis
- Release date: 14 January 1933
- Running time: 86 minutes
- Country: France
- Language: French

Bastille Day or July 14 (French: Quatorze Juillet) is a 1933 French romantic comedy film directed by René Clair and starring Annabella, George Rigaud and Raymond Cordy. It was made at the Epinay Studios by the French subsidiary of the German company Tobis. The film's art direction was by Lazare Meerson.

== Plot ==
Anna, a flower-girl, is in love with Jean - a young taxi driver. Jean doesn't have the same feelings for Anna as he still thinks about Pola, who dumped him. Eventually, Jean asks Anna for a dance at to the ball, but all hell breaks loose when Pola shows up with two men who will stop at nothing to disturb this newly arising love.

== Cast ==
- Annabella as Anna
- George Rigaud as Jean
- Raymond Cordy as Jean's fellow cabbie
- Paul Ollivier as the tuxedoed drunk
- Raymond Aimos as Charles
- Thomy Bourdelle
- Michel André
- Pola Illéry as Pola
- Maximilienne as the tenant
- Gaston Modot
- Gabrielle Rosny
