= A Train in the Night =

1934 film

- Directed by: René Hervil
- Written by: Pierre Maudru
- Based on: The Ghost Train by Arnold Ridley
- Starring: Dolly Davis; Georgius; Alice Tissot
- Production company: Films Régent
- Release date: 28 September 1934
- Running time: 77 minutes
- Country: France
- Language: French

A Train in the Night (French: Un train dans la nuit) is a 1934 French mystery film directed by René Hervil and starring Dolly Davis, Georgius and Alice Tissot. It is an adaptation of Arnold Ridley's play The Ghost Train.

== Synopsis ==
In England a group of passengers are stranded overnight at a remote country station when they miss their connecting train. They are informed that this is the night a ghostly train passes through the station on the anniversary of a terrible train wreck.

== Cast ==
- Dolly Davis as Peggy Murdoch
- Georgius as Teddy Deakin
- Alice Tissot as Miss Bourne
- Héléna Manson as La folle
- Charles Dechamps as Winthrops
- Henry Bonvallet
- Rivers Cadet
- André Carnège
- Henri Fénonjois
- Renée Piat
- François Viguier

== Bibliography ==
- Bessy, Maurice & Chirat, Raymond. Histoire du cinéma français: 1929-1934. Pygmalion, 1988.
- Crisp, Colin. Genre, Myth and Convention in the French Cinema, 1929-1939. Indiana University Press, 2002.
- Goble, Alan. The Complete Index to Literary Sources in Film. Walter de Gruyter, 1999.
- Rège, Philippe. Encyclopedia of French Film Directors, Volume 1. Scarecrow Press, 2009.
