= Paul Ollivier =

French actor

- Born: François Hilarion Paul Olivari; 10 February 1876; Marseille, France
- Died: 10 June 1948 (aged 72); Paris, France
- Occupation: Actor

François Hilarion Paul Olivari, stage name Paul Ollivier (10 February 1876 - 10 June 1948) was a French film actor.

== Selected filmography ==
- The Phantom of the Moulin Rouge (1925)
- Prince Charming (1925)
- The Queen of Moulin Rouge (1926)
- The Imaginary Voyage (1926)
- Captain Rascasse (1927)
- The Italian Straw Hat (1928)
- Mademoiselle's Chauffeur (1928)
- The Unknown Dancer (1929)
- Dolly (1929)
- The Crime of Sylvestre Bonnard (1929)
- Under the Roofs of Paris (1930)
- Congress Dances (1931)
- À Nous la Liberté (1931)
- About an Inquest (1931)
- Le Million (1931)
- Captain Craddock (1931)
- The Triangle of Fire (1932)
- That Scoundrel Morin (1932)
- The Beautiful Adventure (1932)
- Court Waltzes (1933)
- Bastille Day (1933)
- The Last Billionaire (1934)
- Tartarin of Tarascon (1934)
- Merchant of Love (1935)
- Justin de Marseille (1935)
- Little One (1935)
- The Lie of Nina Petrovna (1937)
- Gargousse (1938)
- Bolero (1942)
- Sideral Cruises (1942)
- Mistral (1943)
- Destiny (1946)
- Mirror (1947)
