= Jane Pierson =

French actress

- Occupation: Actor
- Years active: 1924-1952 (film)

Jane Pierson was a French film actress. She appeared in fifty five films between 1924 and 1952.

== Selected filmography ==
- The Imaginary Voyage (1926)
- Captain Rascasse (1927)
- The Marriage of Mademoiselle Beulemans (1927)
- Little Devil May Care (1928)
- The Maelstrom of Paris (1928)
- The Wonderful Day (1929)
- Under the Roofs of Paris (1930)
- Everybody Wins (1930)
- Le Million (1931)
- You Will Be My Wife (1932)
- A Telephone Call (1932)
- Youth (1933)
- La tête d'un homme (1933)
- If I Were Boss (1934)
- The Coquelet Affair (1935)
- Forty Little Mothers (1936)
- The Brighton Twins (1936)
- Fire in the Straw (1939)
- Deputy Eusèbe (1939)
- Threats (1940)
- The Stairs Without End (1943)

== Bibliography ==
- Goble, Alan. The Complete Index to Literary Sources in Film. Walter de Gruyter, 1999.
