= Sunday Encounter =

- Directed by: Marc Allégret
- Written by: Serge de Boissac
- Starring: Bourvil
- Cinematography: Jacques Natteau
- Edited by: Suzanne de Troeye
- Music by: Paul Misraki
- Distributed by: Compagnie Commerciale Française Cinématographique (CCFC)
- Release date: 1958
- Running time: 90 minutes
- Country: France
- Language: French
- Box office: 1,547,780 admissions (France)

Sunday Encounter is the US title for a 1958 French comedy-drama film, Un drôle de dimanche. It was directed by Marc Allégret and stars Arletty, Bourvil and Danielle Darrieux with Jean-Paul Belmondo making an early appearance.

== Cast ==
- Bourvil as Jean Brévent
- Danielle Darrieux as Catherine Brévent
- Arletty as Juliette Armier
- Cathia Caro as Caroline Armier
- Colette Richard as Mireille
- Jean-Paul Belmondo as Patrick
- Jean Wall as M. Saunier
- Roger Hanin as Robert Sartori
- Jean Lefebvre as le concierge de l'agence
- Fernand Sardou as le brigadier
- Jean Ozenne as le représentant de l'agence
- Jean Carmet as le pompiste
- Nicolas Vogel as Chartier
- André Philip as le gendarme attendant le bus
- Jean-Louis Allibert as le portier du Plaza
- Olivier Darrieux as un copain de guerre
- Charles Bouillaud as le réceptionniste
