= Colette Richard =

French actress

- Born: Colette Suzanne Richard; 24 June 1924; Paris, France
- Died: 6 September 2020 (aged 96); Paris, France
- Occupation: Actress
- Years active: 1944–1967 (film & TV)

Colette Richard (1924–2020) was a French film and stage actress. She played the female lead in several films during the late 1940s, otherwise generally appearing in supporting roles.

== Selected filmography ==
- Les petites du quai aux fleurs (1944)
- Lunegarde (1946)
- Mirror (1947)
- Danger of Death (1947)
- Hyménée (1947)
- The Loves of Colette (1948)
- The Ladies in the Green Hats (1949)
- Women Are Crazy (1950)
- Madame du Barry (1954)
- Sunday Encounter (1958)
- Too Late to Love (1959)

== Bibliography ==
- Bedat, Claude. Jean Dieuzaide et la photographie. 1971.
- Bessy, Maurice & Chirat, Raymond. Histoire du cinéma français: 1951-1955. Pygmalion, 1989.
- Goble, Alan. The Complete Index to Literary Sources in Film. Walter de Gruyter, 1999.
