= Germaine Acremant =

French novelist and playwright

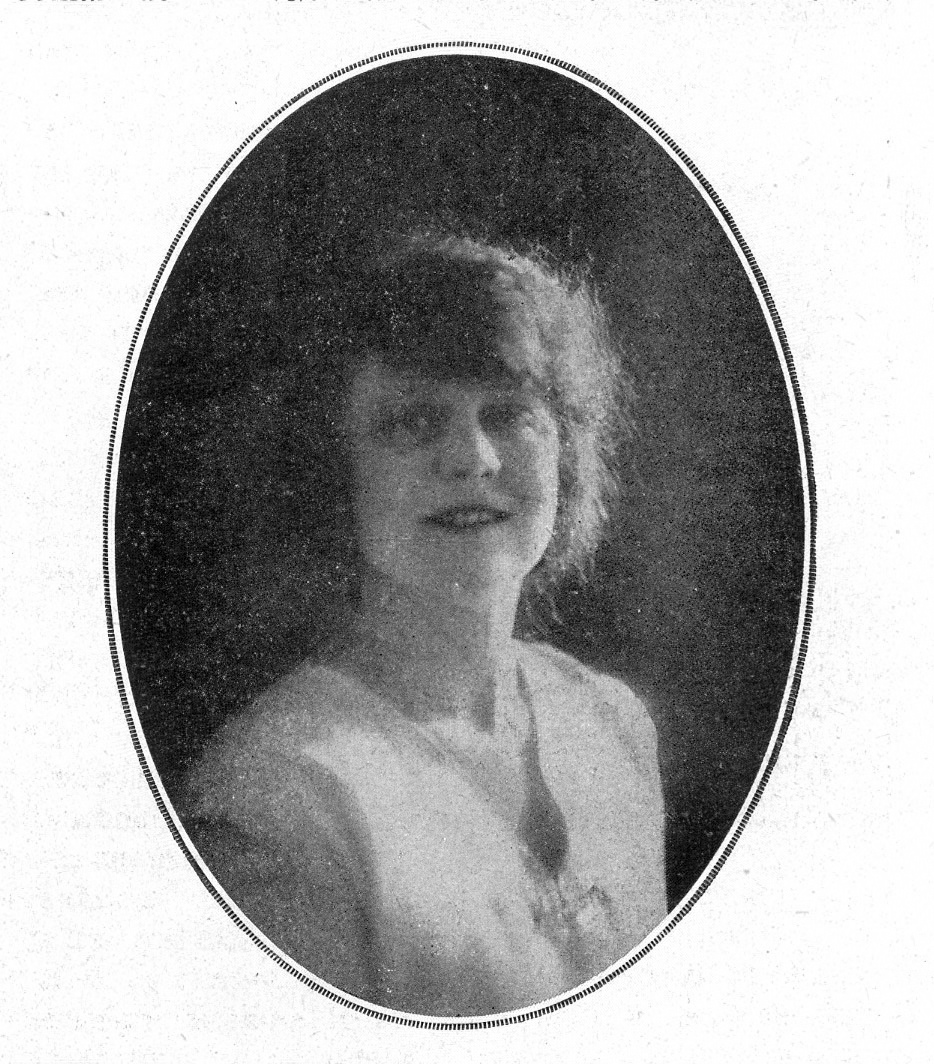
- Born: Germaine Fanny Marie Joséphine Poulain; 13 June 1889; Saint-Omer, Pas-de-Calais, France
- Died: 24 August 1986 (aged 97); Neuilly-sur-Seine, Hauts-de-Seine, France
- Resting place: Clairefontaine-en-Yvelines cemetery, France
- Education: Benedictine Convent, Corbelly Hill, Dumfries, Scotland
- Occupations: novelist; playwright
- Spouse: Albert Acremant (m. 1911; died 1942)
- Children: Jacques Acremant
- Writing career
- Language: French
- Notable awards: Prix Nelly Lieutier; Prix National de Littérature; Montyon Prize; Prix Alice-Louis Barthou

Germaine Acremant (13 June 1889 – 24 August 1986) was a French novelist and playwright. Her best-known work is her first novel Ces dames aux chapeaux verts (These ladies with green hats), a satire of provincial life published in 1921. The Académie Française awarded her the Montyon Prize in 1940 and the Prix Alice-Louis Barthou in 1943.

== Early life and education ==
Germaine Fanny Marie Joséphine Poulain was born 13 June 1889, in Saint-Omer, Pas-de-Calais. She was the third child and the only daughter of Édouard Poulain, a doctor in Saint-Omer, (Pas-de-Calais), rue de Valbelle. Her mother was Jeanne Marie Florentine Fanny Bonvoisin.

Her studies started in her native town before she became a pupil at the Ursulines boarding school. She finished her education at the Benedictine Convent, Corbelly Hill, Dumfries, Scotland.

== Career ==
On October 23, 1911, at Saint-Omer, she married Albert Acremant (1882–1942) who was director of the literary journal, Excelsior, in Paris. She collaborated with him on the operettas of Vincent Scotto. They had a son, Jacques Acremant, painter and illustrator.

It was during World War I (1914–1918), when her brother Pierre Poulain (1887–1914) was killed, that the idea of writing, for entertainment, came to Acremant while she was practicing Watercolor painting.

Her first attempt in literature earned her notoriety: the Société des gens de lettres awarded her Ces dames aux chapeaux verts (1922), which also received the Nelly Lieutier prize in 1921, a hit comedy satire of provincial life, which she wrote with her husband, Albert Acremant. It played a thousand performances at the Sarah Bernhardt theatre and was reprinted many times with more than 1.5 million copies sold. It was translated into 25 languages. The play was adapted for the cinema by the director André Berthomieu in 1929, by Maurice Cloche in 1937, by Fernand Rivers in 1949, then on television in 1979 by André Flédérick (in which Micheline Presle-Telcide and Odette Laure-Rosalie appeared), broadcast in 1982. This novel was followed by many others (about thirty), most of which were set in the North of France, from Saint-Omer to Étaples, from the hills of Artois to the beaches of Le Touquet, via Boulogne-sur-Mer.

Acremant waited almost fifty years to follow up on her first novel, which was received poorly in her hometown. It described the narrow life of a small provincial town. People were hurt as it was possible to recognize some of the fictional characters. Her reconciliation with Saint-Omer took place in 1964 with the organization of the 1st "Festival des dames aux chapeaux verts" (Festival of the ladies with green hats). Her other main works included, Gai ! Marions-nous ! (Prix National de Littérature, 1927), La route mouvante (Montyon Prize 1940), and Arrière-saison (1942). Several of her works were adapted for the theatre, again in collaboration with her husband, who produced the illustrations for several of his wife's novels. In 1970, she published Chapeaux gris… chapeaux verts (Gray hats... green hats), the sequel to Ces dames aux chapeaux verts. The same year, she received the Alice-Louis Barthou prize (French Academy) for all of her work. In 1981, she published Hier que j'aimais (Yesterday I Loved), an autobiographical story. Most of Acremant's works were published by Plon editions. Her last novel appeared in 1983. None of her works succeeded as well as Ces dames aux chapeaux verts.

== Death and legacy ==
In 1984, a commemorative plaque was placed in Saint-Omer on the site of her birthplace, destroyed by a bombardment on June 25, 1944. She died on August 24, 1986, in Neuilly-sur-Seine, Hauts-de-Seine, and was buried in the cemetery of Clairefontaine-en-Yvelines.

== Awards ==
- Prix Nelly Lieutier, 1921
- Prix National de Littérature, 1927
- Montyon Prize, Académie Française, 1940
- Prix Alice-Louis Barthou, Académie Française, 1943

== Selected works ==
=== Novels and stories ===
- Ces dames aux chapeaux verts (1921) - Prix Nelly Lieutier (1921)
- La Hutte d'acajou (1924), illustrated by Jules Joëts
- La Sarrasine (1926)
- Gai ! Marions-nous ! (1927) - Prix National de Littérature (1927)
- Le Carnaval d'été. Au pays de Reuzeapa (1928)
- Gertrude et mon cœur (1929)
- Une petite qui voit grand (1931)
- À l'ombre des célibataires (1932)
- Les Ailes d'argent (1933)
- L'Enfant aux cheveux gris (1934)
- Le Corsage vert pomme (1935)
- Fortune rapide (1936)
- La Route mouvante (1939) - Prix Montyon of the Académie Française (1940)
- Arrière-saison (1942)
- Un enfant trop riche (1944)
- Le Triomphe du printemps (1946)
- Pastorales (1948)
- Méandres (1949)
- Échec au roi (1951), illustrated by A. Chazelle
- Cœur en éclats (1953)
- Les Enchanteresses (1955)
- Par petites tables (1961)
- Joie dans un ciel gris (1963)
- Chapeaux gris, chapeaux verts (1970)
- La Chambre de Charles IX (1972)
- La Grande Affaire (1975)
- Un gendarme tombé du ciel (1977)
- Colombe et son mystère (1978)
- Hier que j'aimais, (1981)
- Le Monsieur de St. Josse (1983)

=== Comedies by Albert and Germaine Acremant ===
- Ces dames aux chapeaux verts, based on the novel, comedy in four acts
- Gai ! Marions-nous !, based on the novel, comedy in four acts
- Le Carnaval d'été, based on the novel, comedy in four acts
- Une petite qui voit grand, based on the novel, comedy in four acts
- Gertrude et mon cœur, comedy in three acts
- Sidi Couscouss, children's play performed at the Théâtre Femina, Paris, 1924
- Comedies in 1 or 2 acts:
  - Chut ! Voilà la bonne
  - Deux réveillons
  - Mon repos
  - Une femme dépensière

=== Other publications ===
- Flandre et Artois, collection (1937)
- Les Trois Châteaux, posthumous (1994)

== See also ==
- The Maelstrom of Paris (1928 film)
- The Ladies in the Green Hats (1929 film)
- The Ladies in the Green Hats (1937 film)
- The Ladies in the Green Hats (1949 film)
