= Captain Rascasse =

1927 film

- Directed by: Henri Desfontaines
- Written by: Paul Dambry
- Starring: Gabriel Gabrio; Claude Mérelle; Jeanne Helbling
- Cinematography: Raoul Aubourdier; Henri Stuckert
- Production company: Société des Cinéromans
- Distributed by: Pathé Consortium Cinéma
- Release date: 1 April 1927
- Country: France
- Languages: Silent; French intertitles

Captain Rascasse (French: Le capitaine Rascasse) is a 1927 French silent adventure film directed by Henri Desfontaines and starring Gabriel Gabrio, Claude Mérelle and Jeanne Helbling.

== Cast ==
- Gabriel Gabrio as 'Capitaine' Rascasse
- Claude Mérelle as Madelon, la reine du whisky
- Jeanne Helbling as Germaine Delaroche-Estève
- Alice Tissot as Miss Waterbury
- Paulette Berger as Paulette Samorède
- Jean Devalde as Jean de Trégor
- Joë Hamman as Curtius Salem
- Pierre Hot as Delaroche-Estève
- Mario Nasthasio as Rodriguez-Garcia
- Paul Ollivier as Pablo Moralès
- Pierre Denols as Trégor Père
- Maurice Della Méa as Monsieur de Lérac
- Albert Decoeur as Samorède
- Engeldorff
- Jim Gérald
- Noëlle Mato
- Jane Pierson
- Cesar-Tullio Terrore

== Bibliography ==
- Dayna Oscherwitz & MaryEllen Higgins. The A to Z of French Cinema. Scarecrow Press, 2009.
