= The Prey of the Wind =

1927 film directed by René Clair

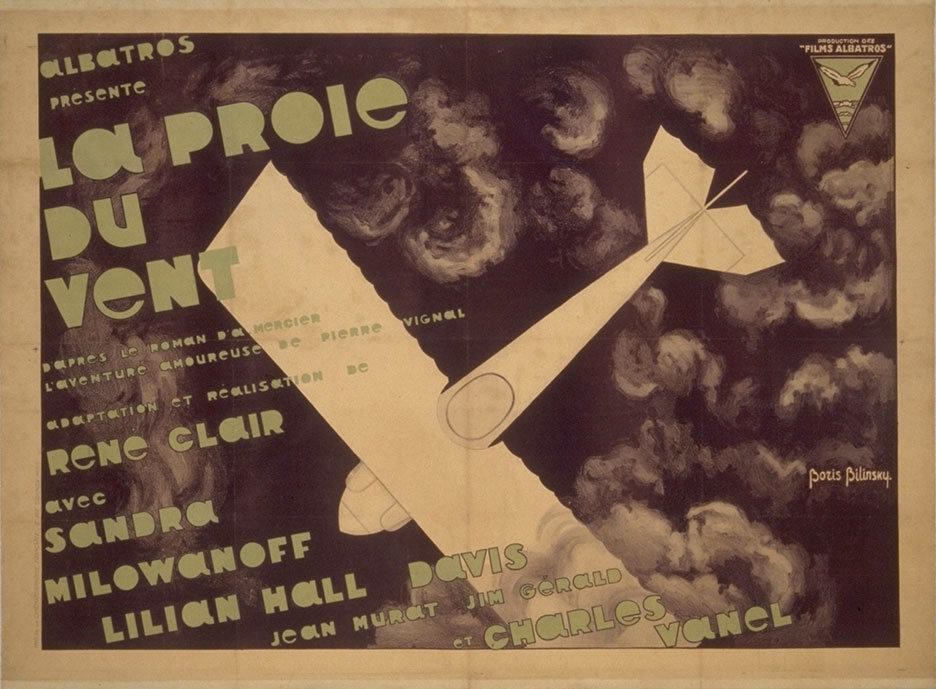
- Poster by Boris Bilinsky
- Directed by: René Clair
- Written by: René Clair; Armand Mercier (novel)
- Starring: Charles Vanel; Sandra Milovanoff; Jean Murat; Lillian Hall-Davis
- Cinematography: Robert Batton; Henri Gondois; Nikolas Roudakoff
- Production companies: Films Albatros; Kamenka
- Release date: 13 May 1927
- Running time: 90 minutes
- Country: France
- Languages: Silent; French intertitles

The Prey of the Wind (1927)

The Prey of the Wind (French: La proie du vent) is a 1927 French silent drama film directed by René Clair and starring Charles Vanel, Sandra Milovanoff and Jean Murat.

A freed revolutionary and his sister-in-law hide a downed pilot at a remote chateau. Romance blooms, but turns deadly when the pilot's traumatized wife arrives, begging for rescue and accusing the pair of murder.

The film's sets were designed by Lazare Meerson.

== Cast ==
- Charles Vanel as Pierre Vignal
- Sandra Milovanoff as La femme folle
- Jean Murat as Le mari
- Lillian Hall-Davis as La châtelaine
- Jim Gérald as Le docteur

== Bibliography ==
- Celia McGerr. René Clair. Twayne Publishers, 1980.
