= Jim Gérald =

French actor (1889–1958)

Jim Gérald (4 July 1889 – 2 July 1958) was a French actor.

Gérald was born Gérald Ernest Cuénod in Paris. He died in Paris in 1958.

== Selected filmography ==
- La légende de soeur Béatrix (1923) - Un soudard
- The Imaginary Voyage (1926) - Auguste
- Le Bouif errant (1926) - Le colonel Bossouzof
- Captain Rascasse (1927)
- The Prey of the Wind (1927) - Docteur Massaski
- Éducation de prince (1928)
- The Italian Straw Hat (1928) - Beauperthuis
- Mademoiselle's Chauffeur (1928) - Jim
- Les transatlantiques (1928) - Jérémie Shaw - le roi du cigare
- Two Timid Souls (1928) - Garadoux
- Le perroquet vert (1929) - Gordon
- Un soir au cocktail's bar (1929) - Barman #1
- Les taciturnes (1929) - Le père Brazec
- Father and Son (1929) - Tibots Rechtsanwalt
- The Night Is Ours (1930) - Barsac père
- Ça aussi!... c'est Paris (1930)
- The Son of the White Mountain (1930) - Desk Clerk
- L'Arlésienne (1930) - Marc, le patron
- La barcarolle d'amour (1930) - Directeur du théatre
- Les chevaliers de la montagne (1930) - Portier de l'hôtel
- Love Songs (1930)
- My Heart Incognito (1931) - Knox - l'imprésario américain
- La folle aventure (1931) - Jubine
- Laurette ou le Cachet rouge (1931) - Le capitaine du brick
- La chanson des nations (1931)
- The Unknown Singer (1931) - Ernest
- My Aunt from Honfleur (1931) - Charles Berthier
- Sailor's Song (1932) - Marius
- My Priest Among the Rich (1932) - L'abbé Pellegrin
- L'amour en vitesse (1932) - Paul Fréderic Schmidt
- Honeymoon Trip (1933)
- Rocambole (1933)
- Rivaux de la piste (1933) - Spengler
- Le testament du Dr. Mabuse (1933) - Commissaire Lohmann
- Toto (1933) - Bruno
- The Constant Nymph (1933) - Trigorin
- Miss Helyett (1933) - Le professeur Smithson
- Mimosa Bar (1933)
- Le grillon du foyer (1933)
- Le Roi des Champs-Élysées (1933) - (uncredited)
- L'auberge du Petit-Dragon (1934) - Le père Michaud
- Le bossu (1934) - Cocardasse
- Un gosse pour 100.000 francs (1934) - César
- The Last Night (1934) - Mathias Krug
- The Man with a Broken Ear (1934) - Le capitaine des pompiers
- Monsieur Sans-Gêne (1935) - Monsieur Perrochin
- Les conquêtes de César (1935)
- Le roi des gangsters (1935)
- Le train d'amour (1936) - Martin
- Mister Flow (1936) - Le Cubain
- The Robber Symphony (1937) - Le charbonnier
- Bulldog Drummond at Bay (1937) - Veight
- Clothes and the Woman (1937) - Enrico Castigliani
- Titin des Martigues (1938) - Loulou les Gros Bras
- Légions d'honneur (1938) - Constant
- That's Sport (1938) - Le directeur du cabaret
- La Rue sans joie (1938) - (uncredited)
- Trois artilleurs en vadrouille (1938) - Le père Dancourt
- Peace on the Rhine (1938) - Grebs
- La boutique aux illusions (1939) - Le bonimenteur
- Farinet ou l'or dans la montagne (1939) - Wirt Crittin
- French Without Tears (1940) - Prof. Maingot
- Cristobal's Gold (1940) - Un pirate
- Macao (1942) - Un matelot
- A Dog's Life (1943) - Calumet
- Boule de suif (1945) - Le capitaine Von Kerfenstein
- The Faceless Enemy (1946) - Ramshow
- La troisième dalle (1946) - Le commissaire Plachon
- Le bateau à soupe (1946) - Le gouverneur
- The Secret of Florida (1947) - Dupont
- Les jeux sont faits (1947) - Renaudel
- Et dix de der (1948) - Smith
- To the Eyes of Memory (1948) - Le major
- La bataille du feu (1949) - M. Farjon
- Blonde (1950) - Le médecin
- Le gang des tractions-arrière (1950) - L'employé de banque
- Adventures of Captain Fabian (1951) - Commissioner Germain
- Dakota 308 (1951) - Van der Enden
- Pardon My French (1951) - Monsieur Poisson
- Take Me to Paris (1951) - Horse Butcher
- Dans la vie tout s'arrange (1952) - Monsieur Poisson
- Adieu Paris (1952)
- The Moment of Truth (1952) - Eddy - le patron du 'Zéro de conduite'
- Moulin Rouge (1952) - Le Père Cotelle (uncredited)
- Naked in the Wind (1953) - Oscar le borgne
- Au diable la vertu (1953) - L'agent de Rita Johnson
- Napoleon Road (1953) - Un membre du comité d'administration (uncredited)
- Le Guérisseur (1953) - Virolet, le rebouteux
- Les crimes de l'amour (1953) - Le père d'Albertine (segment 2 : 'Le rideau cramoisi')
- Daughters of Destiny (1954) - Le cocher / Le soldat (segment "Jeanne") (uncredited)
- Darling Anatole (1954) - Mme Anatole
- It's the Paris Life (1954) - L'Américain
- On Trial (1954) - Le professeur
- Father Brown (1954) - French Stationmaster
- The Barefoot Contessa (1954) - Mr. Blue
- La rafle est pour ce soir (1954) - M. Mongileux
- If Paris Were Told to Us (1956) - Un Cocher
- Marie Antoinette Queen of France (1956) - Un garde (uncredited)
- Foreign Intrigue (1956) - Bistro Owner
- Ces sacrées vacances (1956) - Le directeur du camp
- Les insoumises (1956) - Pére Hector
- Fernand cow-boy (1956) - Richardson
- Elena and Her Men (1956) - Le cafetier
- Zaza (1956) - Edouard Dubuisson
- Les lumières du soir (1956) - L'avocat Paul Flavier
- Honoré de Marseille (1956) - Le Roi des Ligures (uncredited)
- L'auberge en folie (1957)
- Fric-frac en dentelles (1957) - Caltier
- C'est une fille de Paname (1957)
- Le chômeur de Clochemerle (1957)
- Le souffle du désir (1958) - Jim
- Orders to Kill (1958) - François (uncredited)
- La môme aux boutons (1958)
- Dangerous Games (1958)
- Time Bomb (1959) - Drunk (final film role)
