= Raymond Cordy =

French actor (1898–1956)

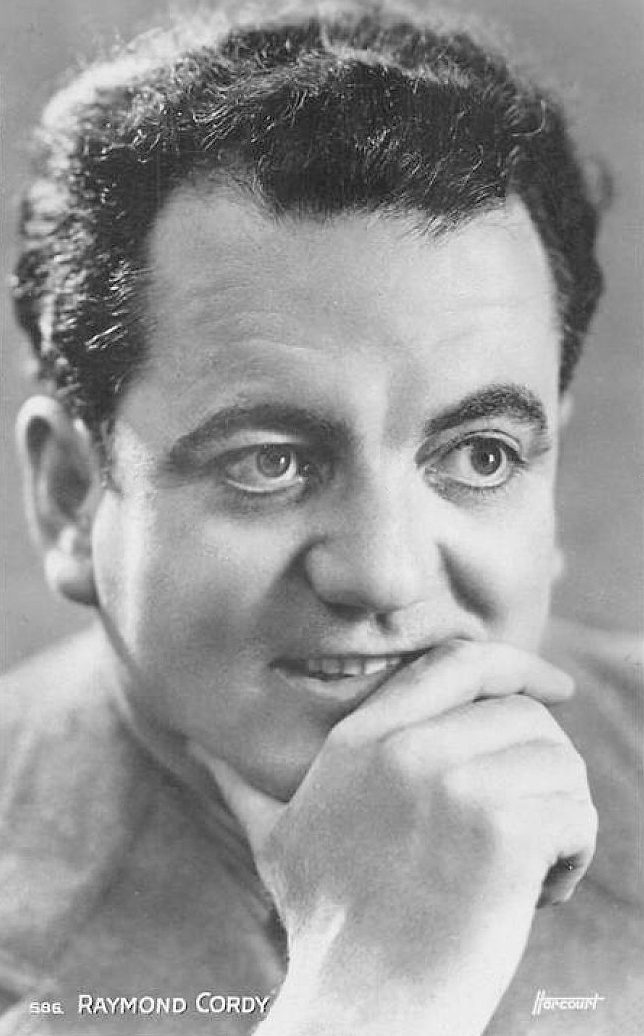
- Cordy in 1948
- Born: 9 December 1898; Vitry-sur-Seine, Val-de-Marne, France
- Died: 23 April 1956 (aged 57); Paris, France
- Other name: Victor Raymond Cordioux
- Occupation: Actor
- Years active: 1930 - 1956 (film)

Raymond Cordy (9 December 1898 – 23 April 1956) was a French film actor, born Raymond Cordiaux. He appeared in over a hundred and thirty films during his career.

== Selected filmography ==
- Little Lise (1930) - Un joueur de billard
- Everybody Wins (1930) - Le pochard
- Maison de danses (1931)
- Le Million (1931) - Le chauffeur de taxi
- Departure (1931)
- Montmartre (1931) - Le boulanger du village (uncredited)
- Atout coeur (1931) - Finois
- A nous la liberté (1931) - Louis
- Dance Hall (1931) - Le machiniste
- Amourous Adventure (1932)
- Pour un sou d'amour (1932) - Antoine - le chauffeur
- Wooden Crosses (1932) - Soldat Vairon
- L'affaire de la rue Mouffetard (1932) - L'accusé
- That Scoundrel Morin (1932)
- Pomme d'amour (1932) - Bayard
- Le petit Babouin (1932) - Petitrone
- Le bidon d'or (1932) - Boulot
- L'homme qui ne sait pas dire non (1932)
- Bastille Day (1933) - Jean's Fellow Cabbie
- Attendez, chauffeur! (1933)
- The Testament of Dr. Mabuse (1933) - Koretsky
- Je vous aimerai toujours (1933) - Le laboureur
- The Oil Sharks (1933) - Hans Mertens
- Une femme au volant (1933) - Le mécanicien
- Colomba (1933) - Giocanto Vastriconi
- Les bleus du ciel (1933) - Achille
- Quelqu'un a tué... (1933)
- At the End of the World (1934) - Dédé
- Vive la compagnie (1934) - Victor Lahuche
- La garnison amoureuse (1934) - Pierre, un cavalier
- Toboggan (1934) - Patte de Quinquina
- The House on the Dune (1934)
- L'aristo (1934) - Bérnu
- The Last Billionaire (1934) - Valet
- Mam'zelle Spahi (1934) - Perlot - l'ordonnance du lieutenant
- Hotel Free Exchange (1934) - Bastien
- Le cavalier Lafleur (1934) - Verjus
- L'auberge du Petit-Dragon (1934) - Émile
- Gold in the Street (1934) - Pierre - un ami d'Albert
- The Slipper Episode (1935) - Le pêcheur
- Le billet de mille (1935) - Un inspecteur
- Pension Mimosas (1935) - Morel
- La caserne en folie (1935) - Victor
- Jacqueline fait du cinéma (1935)
- Juanita (1935) - Pied-Mignon
- La rosière des Halles (1935) - Raymond
- Madame Angot's Daughter (1935) - Louchard
- The Mysteries of Paris (1935) - Cabrion
- The Crew (1935) - Mathieu - l'ordonnance
- Adémaï in the Middle Ages (1935) - Le chef de garde
- Sous la griffe (1935) - Corn
- Return to Paradise (1935)
- His Excellency Antonin (1935) - Antonin
- Honeymoon (1935) - Le portier
- L'impossible aveu (1935) - Le patron du bal
- Les gaîtés de la finance (1936) - Le pisteur
- Haut comme trois pommes (1936) - Victor
- Marinella (1936) - (uncredited)
- Excursion Train (1936) - Pigeonnet
- Le roman d'un spahi (1936) - Boyer
- The Flame (1936) - Le gaffeur
- Prince of the Six Days (1936) - Manager
- La brigade en jupons (1936) - Casimir
- They Were Five (1936) - L'ivrogne
- Girls of Paris (1936) - Emile le Taxi
- Notre-Dame d'amour (1936) - Antonin Cabrol
- J'arrose mes galons (1936)
- Temptation (1936) - Lutard
- À minuit, le 7 (1937) - Robert Tirard
- The Forsaken (1937) - Badar
- Gigolette (1937) - Le coiffeur
- Trois artilleurs au pensionnat (1937) - M. Plume, le charcutier
- Le choc en retour (1937) - Totor
- Ignace (1937) - Le soldat Philibert
- Widow's Island (1937) - Le chauffeur
- Grey's Thirteenth Investigation (1937) - Corvetto
- The West (1938) - Carbonniès
- Les gaietés de l'exposition (1938) - Goléar
- Le coeur ébloui (1938)
- L'ange que j'ai vendu (1938) - Paul
- Runaway Ladies (1938) - Minor Role
- Alexis, Gentleman Chauffeur (1938) - Émile¨Panard
- S.O.S. Sahara (1938) - Charles
- Lights of Paris (1938) - Toto
- La marraine du régiment (1938) - Perlot
- Return at Dawn (1938) - Pali
- My Priest Among the Rich (1938) - Plumoiseau
- Place de la Concorde (1939) - Charles, le chauffeur
- Feux de joie (1939) - Jules
- The Fatted Calf (1939) - Le curé
- Sur le plancher des vaches (1940) - Maurice Veller
- Sing Anyway (1940) - Pimpant
- The Strangers in the House (1942) - L'huissier aux Assises
- La grande marnière (1943) - Courtois
- Le val d'enfer (1943) - Poiroux
- Feu Nicolas (1943) - Victor
- The White Waltz (1943) - Le peintre René Dupré
- Vingt-quatre heures de perm (1945) - Martin
- Ils étaient cinq permissionnaires (1945) - Pimpant
- Le roi des resquilleurs (1945) - Béru
- Special Mission (1946) - Mérignac - un policier de l'équipe de Chabrier
- The Village of Wrath (1947) - Richelieu
- Les beaux jours du roi Murat (1947) - Le père La Grogne
- Man About Town (1947) - Le Frisé
- Criminal Brigade (1947) - Mérignac
- Passeurs d'or (1948) - Roussel
- 56 Rue Pigalle (1949) - Le chauffeur de taxi
- My Aunt from Honfleur (1949) - Clément
- Les vagabonds du rêve (1949)
- The Wreck (1949) - Ignace
- Beauty and the Devil (1950) - Antoine the Servant
- Blonde (1950) - Le brigadier
- Le gang des tractions-arrière (1950) - Marcel La Sauvette
- Piédalu in Paris (1951) - L'huissier-chef
- Capitaine Ardant (1951) - Jules
- Monsieur Octave (1951)
- Trois vieilles filles en folie (1952) - Bébert
- Alone in the World (1952) - Jules
- Beauties of the Night (1952) - Gaston / Le marquis
- Piédalu Works Miracles (1952)
- Milady and the Musketeers (1952) - Nobile
- Love in the Vineyard (1952) - Arbaner
- Son of the Hunchback (1952) - Passepoil
- Manina, the Girl in the Bikini (1952) - Francis - le barman
- Tourbillon (1953) - Le régisseur
- Children of Love (1953) - Le policier
- Piédalu député (1954) - Gardonnet
- Tourments (1954) - Jo Bractonne
- Sidi-Bel-Abbès (1954) - Caporal Génicot
- Three Days of Fun in Paris (1954) - Le garçon de restaurant
- La patrouille des sables (1954) - Peaulegain

The Congress of Mother-in-Laws - Le garde champêtre

- Your Turn, Callaghan (1955) - Le portier
- La pícara molinera (1955) - Alcalde
- The Grand Maneuver (1955) - Le photographe
- La fierecilla domada (1956) - Bautista de Martos
- Les indiscrètes (1956) - Martin
- Bonjour jeunesse (1957) - (final film role)

== Bibliography ==
- Youngkin, Stephen. The Lost One: A Life of Peter Lorre. University Press of Kentucky, 2005.
