= My Daughter's Tutor =

1930 film directed by Géza von Bolváry

- Directed by: Géza von Bolváry
- Written by: Franz Schulz
- Starring: Harry Liedtke; Dolly Davis; Charles Puffy; Tibor Halmay
- Cinematography: Willy Goldberger
- Production company: Deutsche Lichtspiel-Syndikat
- Distributed by: Deutsche Lichtspiel-Syndikat
- Release date: 7 January 1930 (Berlin)
- Country: Germany
- Languages: Silent; German intertitles

My Daughter's Tutor (German: Der Erzieher meiner Tochter) is a 1930 German silent comedy film directed by Géza von Bolváry and starring Harry Liedtke, Dolly Davis, and Charles Puffy. The plot closely mirrored that of Ernst Lubitsch's The Oyster Princess. It was shot at the Tempelhof Studios in Berlin. The film's art director was Robert Neppach.

== Cast ==
- Harry Liedtke as Heinz Heller
- Dolly Davis as Mary
- Charles Puffy as Sami Goldstein
- Tibor Halmay as Bobby Evergreen
- Ernő Verebes
- Fritz Greiner as Schiffskontrolleur
- Adolf E. Licho as Rabbiner
- Albert Paulig as Graf Rüttow-Mallwitz
- Adele Sandrock as Gräfin Rüttow-Mallwitz
- Gaston Modot as Schiffskapitän
- Ernst Senesch as Restaurateur Chanetzky

== Bibliography ==
- Prawer, Siegbert Salomon (2005). Between Two Worlds: The Jewish Presence in German and Austrian Film, 1910–1933. New York: Berghahn Books. ISBN 978-1-84545-074-8.
