= Dolly Davis =

French actress (1896–1962)

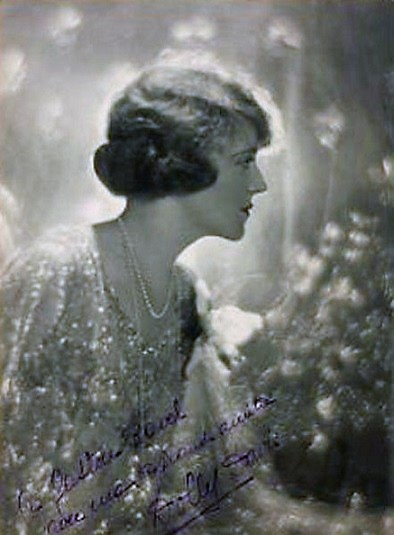
- Davis in the 1920s.
- Born: Julienne Alexandrine David; 30 October 1896; Paris; France
- Died: 3 November 1962 (aged 66); Neuilly-sur-Seine, France
- Occupation: Actress
- Years active: 1920–1938 (film)

Dolly Davis (30 October 1896 – 3 November 1962) was a French film actress. Born Julienne Alexandrine David in Paris, she died in Neuilly-sur-Seine.

== Selected filmography ==
- Hantise (1922)
- Geneviève (1923)
- Vidocq (1923)
- Paris (1924)
- The Imaginary Voyage (1926)
- Paris in Five Days (1926)
- Mademoiselle Josette, My Woman (1926)
- The Chocolate Girl (1927)
- Café Elektric (1927)
- Tingel-Tangel (1927)
- Orient (1928)
- Mademoiselle's Chauffeur (1928)
- Misled Youth (1929)
- Dolly (1929)
- My Daughter's Tutor (1929)
- The Wonderful Day (1929)
- The White Roses of Ravensberg (1929)
- A Hole in the Wall (1930)
- Checkmate (1931)
- Make a Living (1931)
- Shadows of Paris (1932)
- A Train in the Night (1934)
- Three Days Leave (1936)
- Southern Bar (1938)

== Bibliography ==
- Powrie, Phil & Rebillard, Éric. Pierre Batcheff and stardom in 1920s French cinema. Edinburgh University Press, 2009
