= Alice Tissot =

French actress (1890–1971)

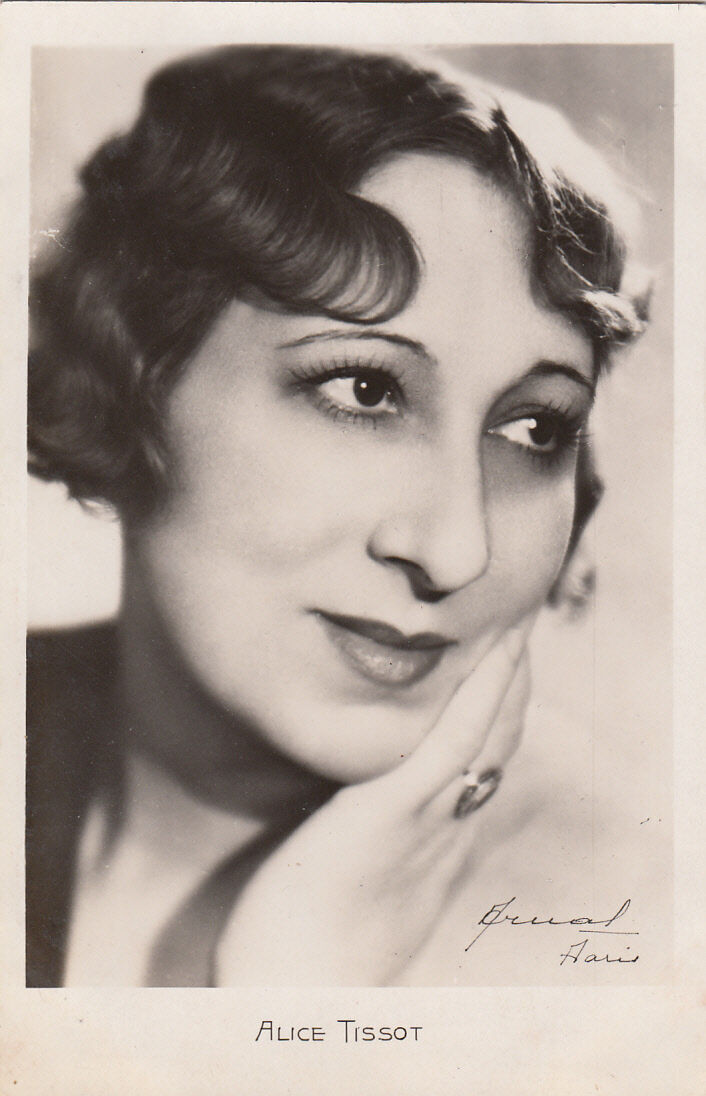
- Born: 1 January 1890; 16th arrondissement of Paris
- Died: 5 May 1971 (aged 81); 15th arrondissement of Paris
- Occupation: Actress

Alice Tissot (English: /tiːˈsoʊ/, French: [alis tiso]; 1 January 1890 – 5 May 1971) was a French actress.

== Partial filmography ==
- Poum à la chasse (1908)
- Le devoir (1908)
- Les Heures – Épisode 4: Le Soir, la nuit (1909)
- Les Heures – Épisode 2: Le Matin, le jour (1909)
- The Two Girls (1921)
- A Son from America (1924)
- Captain Rascasse (1927)
- Cousin Bette (1928)
- Morgane, the Enchantress (1928)
- Mademoiselle's Chauffeur (1928)
- Cagliostro (1929)
- The Ladies in the Green Hats (1929)
- Nights of Princes (1930)
- Captain Craddock (1931)
- The Fortune (1931)
- The Blaireau Case (1932)
- A Happy Man (1932)
- If You Wish It (1932)
- Children of Montmartre (1933)
- Nemo's Bank (1934)
- His Other Love (1934)
- A Train in the Night (1934)
- The Darling of His Concierge (1934)
- Gold in the Street (1934)
- The Man with a Broken Ear (1934)
- Madame Bovary (1934)
- Antonia (1935)
- The Pont-Biquet Family (1935)
- Juanita (1935)
- The Coquelet Affair (1935)
- The Call of Silence (1936)
- Three Days Leave (1936)
- Ignace (1937)
- Francis the First (1937)
- The Ladies in the Green Hats (1937)
- The Tamer (1938)
- My Priest Among the Rich (1938)
- Le Capitaine Fracasse (1943)
- Goodbye Darling (1946)
- Cyrano de Bergerac (1946)
- Loves, Delights and Organs (1947)
- White as Snow (1948)
- Wedding Night (1950)
- Never Two Without Three (1951)
- The Fighting Drummer (1953)
- Naked in the Wind (1953)
- If Paris Were Told to Us (1956)
- Gates of Paris (1957) – La concierge
- Trois marins en bordée (1957) – La directrice du pensionnat
- Le tombeur (1958)
- En bordée (1958)
- Un couple (1960) – Mme Mitouflet
- Quai du Point-du-Jour (1960) – La concierge
- Césarin joue les 'étroits' mousquetaires (1962)
- The Longest Day (1962) – Lenaux's housekeeper
