= Le Million =

1931 film directed by René Clair

- Theatrical release poster
- Directed by: René Clair
- Screenplay by: René Clair
- Based on: The Million; 1911 play by Georges Berr and Marcel Guillemaud
- Produced by: Frank Clifford
- Starring: Annabella; René Lefèvre; Jean-Louis Allibert; Paul Ollivier
- Cinematography: Georges Périnal
- Music by: Armand Bernard; Philippe Parès; Georges Van Parys
- Production company: Tobis Sound Company
- Release date: 15 April 1931 (France)
- Running time: 91 minutes
- Country: France
- Language: French

Le Million is a 1931 French musical comedy film directed by René Clair. The story was adapted by Clair from a play by Georges Berr and Marcel Guillemand.

== Plot ==
Michel, a debt-ridden artist, is interrupted several times while romancing Vanda, a woman whose portrait he is painting: by his roommate, Prosper; by his neighbor and fiancée, Beatrice; and by several of his creditors. As Michel attempts to deal with this situation, Prosper discovers Michel has just won a lottery worth a million Dutch florins. The ticket is in the pocket of a jacket Michel gave to Beatrice to mend, but, when he goes to retrieve it, he learns she has just given the jacket to a charming criminal in order to help him elude the police. She initially does not remember any useful information about the criminal, but Prosper is able to help her recall the man's name: Grandpa Tulip. Armed with this information, Prosper gets Michel to agree to split the prize money if he is the one who recovers the ticket, and he begins his search. When Beatrice remembers Grandpa Tulip's address, Michel sets out as well.

At the junk shop that Grandpa Tulip runs as a front for his criminal activities, Michel finds out an Italian operatic tenor already came by and bought the jacket to use as part of a costume. One of Grandpa Tulip's associates stole a pocket watch from the singer, and he shows it to Michel, in case the man's name is inside. While Michel is inspecting the watch, the police raid the shop and Grandpa Tulip and his men sneak away, leaving Michel to get arrested.

The police think Michel is Grandpa Tulip, so he has them call Prosper to the police station to identify him. While Michel is waiting, the tenor comes in to report the theft of his pocket watch, and Michel hears that the man's name is Ambrosio Sopranelli and he is singing at a local theater, but will soon travel to America. Michel relays this information to Prosper when he arrives, but Prosper responds by acting as though he does not know Michel so Michel will stay imprisoned and Prosper can be the one who recovers the ticket. Eventually, Michel's creditors arrive to identify him, and he heads to the opera house.

Disregarding his feelings of guilt, Prosper passes the time until Sopranelli's performance by visiting Vanda and seducing her with tales of his imminent fortune. He tries and fails to get the ticket from the jacket in Sopranelli's dressing room, and then so does Vanda. Michel asks Beatrice, who is one of the dancers during the performance that evening, to try to get the ticket, but Sopranelli is called to the stage before she can do so. During Sopranelli's first musical number, Michel and Beatrice reconcile.

Grandpa Tulip and his men go to the opera house to find out why Michel was so desperate to regain a threadbare jacket. Beatrice sees him backstage, however, and, to repay her for helping him earlier, he promises to make sure the jacket is returned to her. Meanwhile, Michel and Prosper end up on stage in pursuit of the ticket. When the curtain comes down, they grab the jacket and find themselves pursued by both stage managers and Grandpa Tulip's men. The jacket gets passed around like a football, is accidentally thrown out a window, and lands on top of a passing car.

After the performance, Michel and Beatrice head home in the taxi Michel has been riding in all day while ignoring the driver's demands for payment. Michel discovers this is the car on which the jacket landed and has the driver stop, but, before he can remove the ticket from the pocket, some of Grandpa Tulip's men pull up and force him to give them the jacket.

Dejected, Michel and Beatrice discover his creditors are throwing a lavish party in his apartment, to be paid for out of the lottery winnings. As Michel is about to give everyone the bad news, Grandpa Tulip enters with the jacket. Michel cannot find the ticket inside, but, when it becomes clear to Grandpa Tulip that it is what Beatrice really wanted him to return, he hands the ticket over, having removed it from the jacket before coming over.

== Cast (in credits order) ==
- Annabella as Beatrice
- René Lefèvre as Michel Bouflette
- Jean-Louis Allibert as Prosper
- Paul Ollivier as Granpere Tulipe
- Constantin Siroesco as Ambrosio Sopranelli
- Raymond Cordy as Le Chauffeur De Taxi
- Vanda Gréville as Vanda
- Odette Talazac as La Cantatrice
- Pedro Elviro as Le Regisseur
- Jane Pierson as L'Epiciere
- Andre Michaud as Le Boucher
- Eugene Stuber as Le Policier
- Pierre Alcover as Le Policier
- Armand Bernard as Le Chef D'Orchestre
- Gabrielle Rosny
- Georgette Dalmas
- Jean Gaubens
- Teddy Michaud
- Louis Musy
- Louis Pre Fils
- Georges Zwingel
- Edouard Francomme
- Franck Maurice
- Henri Kerny
- Gustave Huberdeau
- Allan Durant

== Production ==
Le Million was director René Clair's second sound film. He had initially been skeptical about the introduction of sound to motion pictures and detested the slavish devotion to dialogue on display in most early sound films (at one point calling sound "an unnatural creation, just useful for canned theater"), but his stance softened when he realized how sound could be used as a counterpoint to image; an example of this in Le Million is the scene where Clair used sounds from a football game to accompany footage of various characters fighting over a jacket.

== Release ==
The film was released in France on 15 April 1931.

== Critical reception ==
Pauline Kael, the eminent film critic for The New Yorker, lavished praise on the film, calling it "René Clair at his exquisite best; no one else has ever been able to make a comedy move with such delicate, dreamlike inevitability [...] This movie is lyrical, choreographic, giddy--it's the best French musical of its period." Leslie Halliwell gave it four of four stars: "With its delicate touch, perfect sense of comedy timing and infectious use of recitative and song, this is superb screen entertainment using most of the medium's resources." Paul Sherman of the Boston Herald described the film as "lively and down-to-earth". Jeremy Heilman of MovieMartyr.com wrote that the "sophisticated use of the fledgling [sound] technology led to universal acclaim for the director, who became regarded as the first true master of the sound film." Elliot Stein, writing for The Criterion Collection, called the film "a synthesis, a perfect fusion of sound, dialogue, camera placement and editing. The mood may be ironic, sad or happy, but music and song are never far away." The movie was also in the top 10 of the first British Film Institute's Sight and Sound poll in 1952.

Film critic Pauline Kael said that the film was able to achieve greatness because it "triumphantly achieved a style."
