= The Ladies in the Green Hats (1929 film) =

1929 film

- Directed by: André Berthomieu
- Written by: Germaine Acremant (novel)
- Starring: Gabrielle Fontan; René Lefèvre; Alice Tissot
- Cinematography: Georges Périnal
- Production company: Étoile-Film
- Distributed by: Étoile-Film
- Release date: 27 September 1929
- Country: France
- Languages: Silent; French intertitles

The Ladies in the Green Hats (French: Ces dames aux chapeaux verts) is a 1929 French silent comedy film directed by André Berthomieu and starring Gabrielle Fontan, René Lefèvre and Alice Tissot. It is based on the novel of the same name by Germaine Acremant.

== Cast ==
- Gabrielle Fontan as Rosalie
- René Lefèvre as Ulysse Hiacinther
- Alice Tissot as Marie
- Jean Dehelly as Jean de Fleurville
- Thérèse Kolb as Ernestine
- Simone Mareuil as Arlette
- Georges Deneubourg
- Jean Diéner
- Raymond Narlay
- Hubert Daix
- Gina Barbieri as Telcide
- Dolly Fiorella
- Alexandre Heraut
- Paul Versa

== Bibliography ==
- Goble, Alan. The Complete Index to Literary Sources in Film. Walter de Gruyter, 1999.
