= The Ladies in the Green Hats (1949 film) =

- Directed by: Fernand Rivers
- Written by: Germaine Acremant (novel); Yves Mirande; Fernand Rivers
- Produced by: Fernand Rivers
- Starring: Colette Richard; Henri Guisol; Marguerite Pierry
- Cinematography: Jean Bachelet
- Edited by: Marguerite Beaugé
- Music by: Henri Verdun
- Production company: Les Films Fernand Rivers
- Release date: 6 May 1949
- Country: France
- Language: French

The Ladies in the Green Hats (French: Ces dames aux chapeaux verts) is a 1949 French comedy film directed by Fernand Rivers and starring Colette Richard, Henri Guisol and Marguerite Pierry. It was the third adaptation of Germaine Acremant's novel of the same title to be made.

The film's sets were designed by art director René Renoux.

== Cast ==
- Colette Richard as Arlette
- Henri Guisol as Ulysse
- Marguerite Pierry as Telcide
- Jane Marken as Rosalie Davernis
- Elisa Ruis as Marie
- Mag-Avril as Jeanne
- Jean Tissier as Dutoir
- Christian Bertola as Jacques de Fleurville
- Jean-Pierre Méry as Le frère d'Arlette
- Pierre Juvenet
- Nina Myral
- Gabriel Sardet

== Bibliography ==
- Goble, Alan. The Complete Index to Literary Sources in Film. Walter de Gruyter, 1999.
