= The Imaginary Voyage =

1926 film directed by René Clair

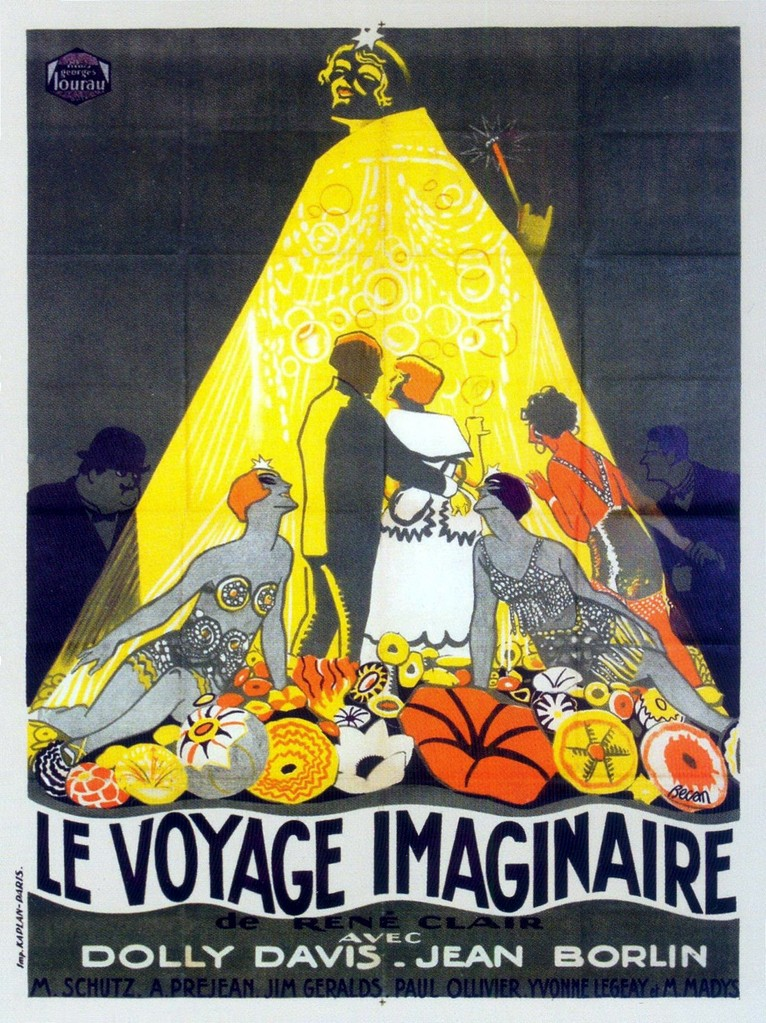
- Directed by: René Clair
- Written by: René Clair
- Produced by: Rolf de Maré
- Starring: Dolly Davis; Jean Börlin; Albert Préjean
- Cinematography: Jimmy Berliet; Amédée Morrin
- Production company: Georges Loureau
- Distributed by: Les Grands Spectacles Cinématographiques
- Release date: 30 April 1926
- Running time: 80 minutes
- Country: France
- Languages: Silent; French intertitles

The Imaginary Voyage (French: Le voyage imaginaire) is a 1926 French silent comedy film directed by René Clair and starring Dolly Davis, Jean Börlin and Albert Préjean.

== Plot ==
The Imaginary Voyage (1926)

In a vivid daydream, a reserved bank clerk is guided by a fairy into an underground realm where ordinary people morph into animals and wax figures spring to life. Lucie, the woman he admires from work, joins him, but they encounter obstacles as a malevolent fairy endeavors to keep them separated.

== Cast ==
- Dolly Davis as Lucie – a typist
- Jean Börlin as Jean
- Albert Préjean as Albert
- Jim Gérald as Auguste
- Paul Ollivier as the bank manager
- Maurice Schutz as La sorcière
- Yvonne Legeay as La mauvaise fée
- Marguerite Madys as Urgel - la bonne fée
- Marise Maia
- Bronja Perlmutter
- Jane Pierson
- Louis Pré Fils

== Bibliography ==
- Dayna Oscherwitz & MaryEllen Higgins. The A to Z of French Cinema. Scarecrow Press, 2009.
