= Tingel-Tangel (1927 film) =

1927 film

Tingel Tangel
- Directed by: Gustav Ucicky
- Written by: Alexander Engel (story); Walter Reisch
- Produced by: Alexander Kolowrat
- Starring: Dolly Davis; Igo Sym; Rudolf Klein-Rogge
- Cinematography: Eduard von Borsody
- Production company: Sascha-Film
- Distributed by: Siegel-Monopolfilm (Germany)
- Release date: 21 October 1927
- Country: Austria
- Languages: Silent; German intertitles

Tingel Tangel is a 1927 Austrian silent film directed by Gustav Ucicky and starring Dolly Davis, Igo Sym and Rudolf Klein-Rogge.

The film's sets were designed by the art director Artur Berger.

== Cast ==
- Dolly Davis as Li Bergmeister
- Igo Sym as Marquese de la Mota
- Rudolf Klein-Rogge as Don Fabio Coridon
- Paul Hartmann as Derfinger, Sekretär
- Tilla Shell as Dolores
- Hans Peppler as Don Pepe Coridon
- Tini Senders as Sängerin
- Viktor Franz as Wirt
- Karl Hartl as Le chef de station

== Bibliography ==
- Reimer, Robert C. & Reimer, Carol J. The A to Z of German Cinema. Scarecrow Press, 2010.
