= René Clair =

French filmmaker and writer (1898–1981)

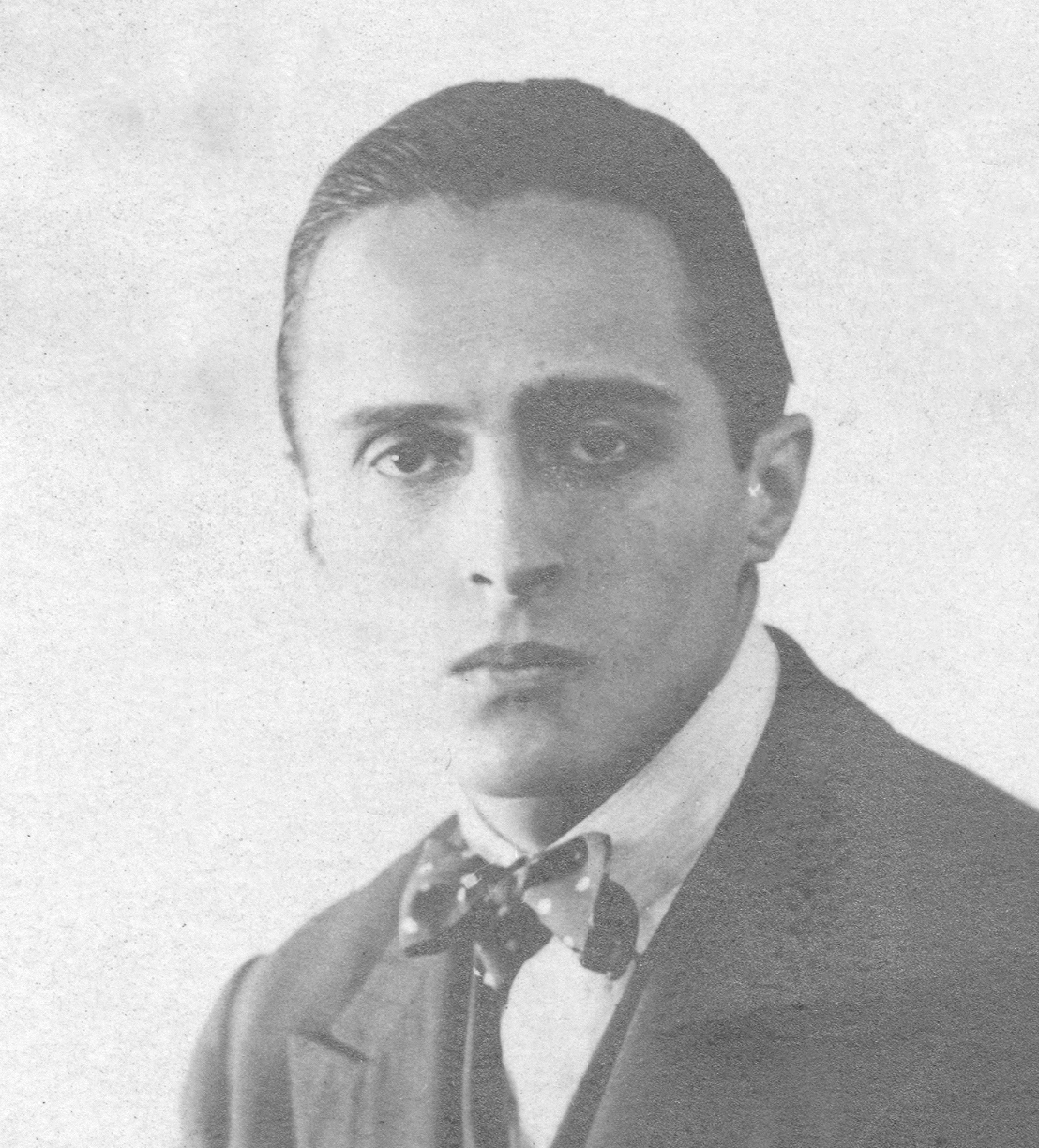
- Clair in 1930
- Born: René-Lucien Chomette; 11 November 1898; Paris, France
- Died: 15 March 1981 (aged 82); Neuilly-sur-Seine, Hauts-de-Seine, Île-de-France, France
- Occupations: Director; producer; writer; actor
- Years active: 1924–1976
- Spouse: Bronia Clair (m.1926)
- Children: 1

René Clair (French: [ʁəne klɛʁ]; 11 November 1898 – 15 March 1981), born René-Lucien Chomette ([ʁəne lysjɛ̃ ʃɔmɛt]), was a French filmmaker and writer. He first established his reputation in the 1920s as a director of silent films which often featured fantasy comedy themes. He went on to make some of the most innovative early sound films in France, before going abroad to work in the United Kingdom and the United States for more than a decade. Returning to France in the aftermath of World War II, he continued to make films that were characterised by their elegance and wit, often presenting a nostalgic view of French life in earlier years. He was elected to the Académie Française in 1960. Clair's best known films include Un chapeau de paille d'Italie (The Italian Straw Hat, 1928), Sous les toits de Paris (Under the Roofs of Paris, 1930), Le Million (1931), À nous la liberté (1931), I Married a Witch (1942), and And Then There Were None (1945).

== Early life ==
René Clair was born and grew up in Paris in the district of Les Halles, whose lively and picturesque character made a lasting impression on him. His father was a soap merchant; he had an elder brother, Henri Chomette (born 1896). He attended the Lycée Montaigne and the Lycée Louis-le-Grand. In 1914 he was studying philosophy; his friends at that time included Raymond Payelle who became the actor and writer Philippe Hériat. In 1917, at the age of 18, he served as an ambulance driver in World War I, before being invalided out with a spinal injury. He was deeply affected by the horrors of war that he witnessed and gave expression to this in writing a volume of poetry called La Tête de l'homme (which remained unpublished). Back in Paris after the war, he started a career as a journalist at the left-wing newspaper L'Intransigeant.

== Film career ==
Having met the music-hall singer Damia and written some songs for her, Clair was persuaded by her to visit the Gaumont studios in 1920 where a film was being cast and he then agreed to take on a leading role in Le Lys de la vie, directed by Loïe Fuller and Gabrielle Sorère. He adopted the stage-name of René Clair, and several other acting jobs followed, including Parisette for Louis Feuillade. In 1922 he extended his career as a journalist, becoming the editor of a new film supplement to a monthly magazine, Théâtre et Comœdia illustrés. He also visited Belgium and after an introduction from his brother Henri, he became an assistant to the director Jacques de Baroncelli on several films.

=== 1924–1934 ===
In 1924, with the support of the producer Henri Diamant-Berger, Clair got the opportunity to direct his own first film, Paris qui dort (The Crazy Ray), a short comic fantasy. Before it had been shown however, Clair was asked by Francis Picabia and Erik Satie to make a short film to be shown as part of their Dadaist ballet Relâche; he made Entr'acte (1924), and it established Clair as a leading member of the Parisian avant-garde.

La Tour (1928), a short film by Clair about the Eiffel Tower

Fantasy and dreams were also components of his next two films, but in 1926 Clair took a new direction when he joined Alexandre Kamenka's Films Albatros company to film a dramatic story, La Proie du vent (The Prey of the Wind), which met with commercial success. He remained at Albatros for his last two silent films, Un chapeau de paille d'Italie (An Italian Straw Hat) and Les Deux Timides (Two Timid Souls) (both 1928), in which he sought to translate the essentially verbal comedy of two plays by Labiche into works of silent cinema. While at Albatros, Clair met the designer Lazare Meerson and the cameraman Georges Périnal who were to remain important collaborators with him for the next decade. By the end of the silent era, Clair was celebrated as one of the great names in cinema, alongside Griffith, Chaplin, Pabst and Eisenstein. As the author of all of his own scripts, who also paid close attention to every aspect of the making of a film, including the editing, Clair was one of the first French film-makers to establish for himself the full role of an auteur.

Clair was initially sceptical about the introduction of sound to films, and called it "an unnatural creation". He then realised the creative possibilities that it offered, particularly, in his view, if the soundtrack was not used realistically; words and pictures need not, and indeed should not, be tied together in a clumsy duplication of information; dialogue did not always need to be heard. Between 1930 and 1933, Clair explored these ideas in his first four sound films, starting with Sous les toits de Paris (Under the Roofs of Paris); this was followed by Le Million (1931), À nous la liberté (1931), and Quatorze juillet (Bastille Day) (1933). All of these films portrayed an affectionate and idealized view of working class life, and they did much to create a popular romantic image of Paris which was seen around the world. These films were made at the Epinay Studios for Films Sonores Tobis, a French subsidiary of the German-owned Tobis company.

When Chaplin made Modern Times in 1936, it was noted that some parts of it bore a marked similarity to scenes in À nous la liberté, and the production company Tobis launched a lawsuit for plagiarism against United Artists, the producers of Chaplin's film. Clair was embarrassed by this since he acknowledged his own debt to the spirit of Chaplin, and he refused to be associated with the action.

After the immense success of these early sound films, Clair met with a major setback when his next film, Le Dernier Milliardaire (The Last Billionaire/The Last Millionaire) (1934), was a critical and commercial flop. While he was visiting London for the film's British première, he met Alexander Korda who offered him a contract to work in England. He accepted, and began a lengthy period of exile from film-making in France.

=== 1935–1946 ===
Clair's contract with Korda's London Films was for two years and it envisaged three films. Because of his limited English, he collaborated with the American dramatist Robert E. Sherwood as script-writer for his first film, The Ghost Goes West (1935), a comic fantasy about transatlantic culture clash. Clair and Sherwood became close friends. In January 1936, Clair visited America for two weeks, checking out future employment possibilities but still planning to remain with Korda. Korda however rejected Clair's next script and they parted company. Clair's remaining time in England led to only one more completed film, Break the News (1938), a musical comedy with Jack Buchanan and Maurice Chevalier.

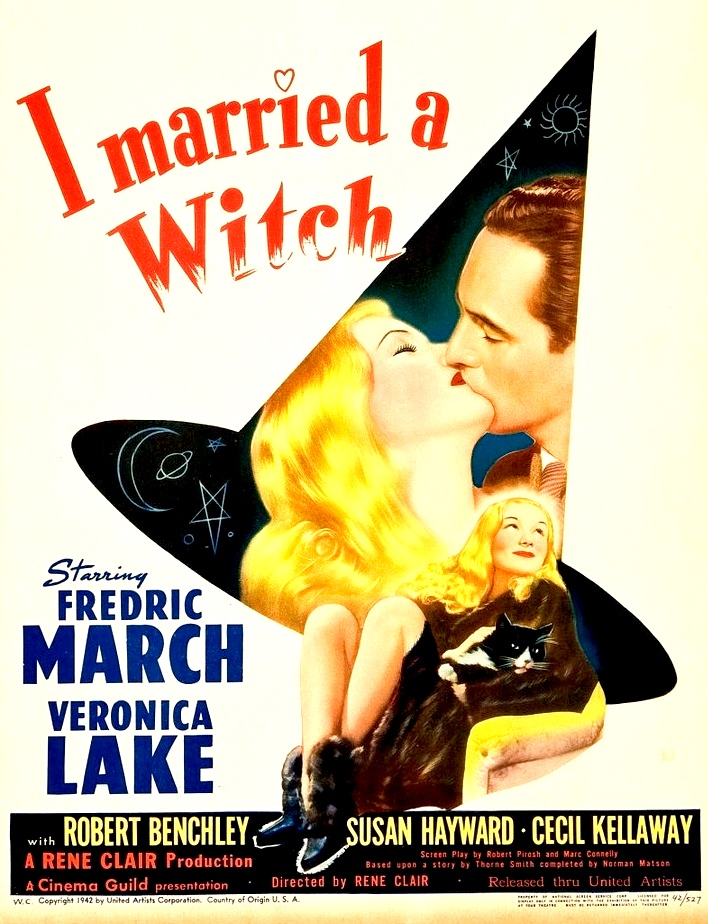
I Married a Witch (1942)

Returning to France, Clair attempted to make another film there in 1939, Air pur, which was to be a celebration of youth and childhood, but the outbreak of war interrupted filming and it was abandoned. In May 1940, Jean Giraudoux, then Minister of Information, suggested to Clair that the film profession should concentrate its resources in the south of country in Nice and Marseille – and if necessary establish a French production centre in the United States. It was with this last plan in mind that Clair and his family, along with Julien Duvivier, departed for America, but by the time he reached New York the project had already fallen through and he went straight on to Hollywood where several studios were interested in employing him. He made his first American film for Universal Studios, The Flame of New Orleans (1941), but it was such a commercial failure that for a time Clair's career as a director was in the balance. After more than a year's delay, his next film was I Married a Witch (1942), followed by It Happened Tomorrow (1944), both of which did respectably well, and then And Then There Were None (1945), which turned out to be an exceptional commercial success despite being perhaps the least personal of his Hollywood ventures. Each of Clair's American films was made for a different studio.

In 1941 Clair was stripped of his French citizenship by the Vichy government, though this was later reversed. It was also in 1941 that he learned of the death of his brother Henri Chomette in France from polio. In 1943, he was planning to go to Algeria to organise the Service Cinématographique de l'Armée, but funding for the project was withdrawn just as he was on the point of departure. In July 1945 he went back to France for a short visit, and then returned finally in July 1946, having signed a contract with RKO for his next film to be made in France.

Clair's American exile had allowed him to develop his characteristic vein of ironical fantasy with several commercially successful films, but there was some feeling that it had been at the expense of personal control and that his output there had not matched the quality of his earlier work in France. Clair himself recognised that being employed by the highly organized American studios had allowed him to work in ideal circumstances: "In spite of the restrictions of the American system, it is possible, if one wishes, to take responsibility. In my four Hollywood films I managed to do what I wanted."

=== 1947–1965 ===
Clair's first film on his return to France was the romantic comedy Le silence est d'or (Silence is Golden) (1947), which was set in 1906 and nostalgically evoked the world of early French film-making; its plot also created variations on Molière's L'École des femmes. Clair considered it one of his best post-war films. Literary inspirations also underpinned other films: Faust for La Beauté du diable (Beauty and the Devil) (1950); and Don Juan for Les Grandes Manœuvres (1955). In these two films and the intervening Les Belles de nuit (Beauties of the Night) (1952), the leading actor was Gérard Philipe who became a friend and a favourite performer for Clair. Porte des Lilas (1957) was a sombre film, set once again in a popular district of Paris with its picturesque inhabitants, for which the singer Georges Brassens was persuaded to give his only film performance.

During the 1950s, as a new generation of French critics and film-makers emerged who were impatient of the prevailing modes of film production, Clair found himself increasingly criticised as a representative of the cinéma de qualité, a "cinema of old men" dominated by nostalgia for their younger days. His status as a figure of the 'establishment' was further confirmed by his election to the Académie Française in 1960. Although he continued to make a few more films in comic vein such as Tout l'or du monde (All the Gold in the World) (1961), they were not well received and he made his last film, Les Fêtes galantes (The Lace Wars), in 1965.

== Writing and later work ==
Clair began his career as a journalist, and writing remained an important interest for him to which he increasingly turned in his later years. In 1926 he published a novel, Adams (translated into English as Star Turn), about a Hollywood star for whom the distinction between the real and unreal becomes blurred. He occasionally returned to writing fiction (La Princesse de Chine and Jeux du hasard), but many of his publications dealt with the cinema, including reflections on his own films. Apart from many journal articles, his main publications were:

- Adams. (Paris: Grasset, 1926). English translation, Star Turn, (London: Chatto & Windus, 1936).
- Réflexion faite. (Paris: Gallimard, 1951). English translation, Reflections on the Cinema. (London: William Kimber, 1953).
- La Princesse de Chine, suivi de De fil en aiguille. (Paris: Grasset, 1951).
- Comédies et commentaires. (Paris: Gallimard, 1959) [includes 5 of Clair's screenplays]. English translation, in part, Four Screenplays. (New York: Orion Press, 1970).
- Discours de réception à l'Académie française. (Paris: Gallimard, 1962).
- Tout l'or du monde. (Paris: Gallimard, 1962).
- Cinéma d'hier, cinéma d'aujourd'hui. (Paris: Gallimard, 1970). English translation, Cinema Yesterday and Today. (New York: Dover, 1972).
- L'Étrange Ouvrage des cieux, d'après The Dutch Courtezan de Jon Marston. (Paris: Gallimard, 1972).
- Jeux du hasard: récits et nouvelles. (Paris: Gallimard, 1976).

Clair also ventured into other media. In 1951 he directed his first radio production, Une larme du diable. In 1959 he directed a stage production of Musset's On ne badine pas avec l'amour, in which Gérard Philipe gave one of his last performances before his death later that year. In 1972 he staged Gluck's Orphée for the Paris Opéra.

== Personal life ==
At the end of 1924, while Clair was working on Ciné-sketch for the theatre with France Picabia, he first met a young actress, Bronja Perlmutter, who subsequently appeared in his film Le Voyage imaginaire (1926) premiered at the newly opened Studio des Ursulines. They married in 1926, and their son, Jean-François, was born in 1927.

René Clair died at home on 15 March 1981, and he was buried privately at Saint-Germain-l'Auxerrois.

== Reputation ==
Clair's reputation as a film-maker underwent a considerable reevaluation during the course of his own lifetime: in the 1930s he was widely seen as one of France's greatest directors, alongside Renoir and Carné, but thereafter his work's artifice and detachment from the realities of life fell increasingly from favour. The avant-gardism of his first films, and especially Entr'acte, had given him a temporary notoriety, and a grounding in surrealism continued to underlie much of his comedy work. It was however the imaginative manner in which he overcame his initial scepticism about the arrival of sound which established his originality, and his first four sound films brought him international fame.

Clair's years of working in the UK and USA made him still more widely known but did not show any marked development in his style or thematic concerns. It was in the post-war films that he made on his return to France that some critics have observed a new maturity and emotional depth, accompanied by a prevailing sense of melancholy but still framed by the elegance and wit that characterised his earlier work.

However, in the 1950s the critics who heralded the arrival of the French New Wave, especially those associated with Cahiers du Cinéma, found Clair's work old-fashioned and academic. François Truffaut wrote harshly of him after seeing The Flame of New Orleans: "We don't follow our elders in paying the same tribute to Renoir and Clair. There is no film by Clair which matches the invention and wit of Renoir's Tire au flanc.... Clair makes films for old ladies who go to the cinema twice a year."

André Bazin, the founding editor of Cahiers, made a more measured assessment: "René Clair has remained in a way a film-maker of the silent cinema. Whatever the quality and importance of his recent films, expression through the image always predominates over that of the word and one almost never misses the essence if one can only vaguely hear the dialogue." It was also in a special number of Cahiers du Cinéma reviewing the current state of the French cinema in 1957 that Clair received one of his most positive appreciations: "A complete film author who, since the silent era, has brought to the French cinema intelligence, refinement, humour, an intellectual quality that is slightly dry but smiling and in good taste.... Whatever may follow in his rich career, he has created a cinematic world that is his own, full of rigour and not lacking in imagination, thanks to which he remains one of our greatest film-makers."

Such appreciations have subsequently been rare, and the self-contained artificiality of Clair's films, his insistence on the meticulous preparation of an often literary script, and his preference for filming in studio sets rather than on location increasingly set him apart from modern trends in film-making. The paradox of Clair's reputation has been further heightened by those commentators who have seen François Truffaut as the French cinema's true successor to Clair, notwithstanding the occasions of their mutual disdain.

== Filmography ==
=== Feature films ===
- Paris qui dort (1924)
  - Paris Asleep
  - The Crazy Ray
- Le Fantôme du Moulin-Rouge (1925)
  - The Phantom of the Moulin Rouge
- Le Voyage imaginaire (1926)
  - The Imaginary Voyage
- La Proie du vent (1927)
  - The Prey of the Wind
- Un chapeau de paille d'Italie (1928)
  - An Italian Straw Hat
- Les Deux Timides (1928)
  - Two Timid Souls
- Sous les toits de Paris (1930)
  - Under the Roofs of Paris
- Le Million (1931)
  - The Million
- À nous la liberté (1931)
  - Freedom for Us
- Quatorze Juillet (1933)
  - Bastille Day
- Le Dernier Milliardaire (1934)
  - The Last Billionaire
- The Ghost Goes West (1935)
- Break the News (1938)
- The Flame of New Orleans (1941)
- I Married a Witch (1942)
- Forever and a Day (1943)
- It Happened Tomorrow (1944)
- And Then There Were None (1945)
- Le silence est d'or (1947)
  - Silence Is Golden
  - Man About Town
- La Beauté du diable (1950)
  - Beauty of the Devil
- Les Belles de nuit (1952)
  - Beauties of the Night
- Les Grandes Manœuvres (1955)
  - The Grand Maneuver
  - Summer Manoeuvres
- Porte des Lilas (1957)
  - Gate of Lilacs
  - The Gates of Paris
- Tout l'or du monde (1961)
  - All the Gold in the World
- Les Fêtes galantes (1965)
  - The Lace Wars

=== Short films ===
- Entr'acte (1924)
- La Tour (1928) (documentary)
- Forever and a Day (1943) (segment "1897")
- La Française et l'Amour (1960) (segment "Mariage, Le")
  - Love and the Frenchwoman
- Les Quatre Vérités (1962) (segment "Les Deux Pigeons")
  - Three Fables of Love

=== Television ===
- Les Fables de La Fontaine (1964) (episodes "?")

== Awards and honours ==
René Clair held the national honours of Grand officier de la Légion d'honneur, Commandeur des Arts et des Lettres, and Grand-croix de l'ordre national du Mérite. He received the Grand Prix du cinéma français in 1953.

In 1951, he won the Prix Italia in Naples for a French radio production of Une larme du diable by Théophile Gautier.

In 1956 he was awarded an honorary doctorate by the University of Cambridge.

In 1960 he was elected to the Académie Française; he was not the first film-maker so honoured (he was preceded by Marcel Pagnol (1946), Jean Cocteau (1955), and Marcel Achard (1959)) but he was the first to be elected primarily as a film-maker. In 1994 the Académie established the Prix René-Clair as an annual prize awarded to a distinguished film-maker.

In 1967 he received an honorary doctorate from the Royal College of Art in London.

As well as many awards made for individual films, Clair received an honorary prize at the 11th Moscow International Film Festival in 1979 for his contribution to cinema.

Place René Clair in Boulogne-Billancourt, on the outskirts of Paris and near the site of the former film studios in that district, is named after him.

== See also ==
- List of ambulance drivers during World War I
- Cinema pur
