= Robert Etcheverry =

French actor

- Born: January 30, 1937; Paris, France
- Died: 21 November 2007 (aged 70); Paris, France
- Occupation: Actor

Robert Etcheverry (1937-2007) was a French actor.

He may be mainly known in Britain as the hero of The Flashing Blade. He was married to Bérangère Vattier for 20 years which resulted a daughter. His younger brother was the handball player Jean-Pierre Etcheverry.

== Filmography ==
- La fille du torrent (1962)
- Le Coup de pistolet (1965)
- The Seagull (1966)
- The Flashing Blade (1967)
- Isabelle (1970)
- Arpad, the Gypsy (1973)
- Operation Leopard (1980)
- A Captain's Honor (1982)
- S.A.S. à San Salvador (1983)
- Julien Fontanes, magistrat (1986)
- Commissaire Moulin (1989)
- Les Cinq Dernières Minutes (1990)

== Theatrical Stage ==
- Bérénice (1956)
- Les Misérables (1957)
- Ruy Blas (1961)
- Life of Galileo (1963)
- The Trojan War Will Not Take Place (1963)
- The Death of Seneca (1963)
- Lucrèce Borgia (1964–65)
- Liolà (1965)
- Le Barbier de Séville (1965)
