= Les Femmes collantes =

- Directed by: Pierre Caron
- Written by: Jean de Letraz
- Based on: Les Femmes collantes, operetta by Léon Gandillot
- Produced by: Pierre Caron; Serge Sandberg
- Starring: Henri Garat; Marguerite Moreno; Betty Stockfeld; Josseline Gaël
- Cinematography: Willy Faktorovitch (as Willy)
- Edited by: Jean Bert
- Music by: Vincent Scotto
- Production companies: Les Films SACA; Société de Production du Film Les Femmes Collantes
- Release date: 27 April 1938 (Paris)
- Running time: 95 minutes (5,700 s)
- Country: France
- Language: French

Les Femmes collantes is a 1938 French film directed by Pierre Caron. It is based on the 1886 opéra bouffe of the same name by Léon Gandillot, and was preceded by a 1920 film written by Gandillot and directed by Georges Monca with Charles Prince.

== Plot ==
Jacques Badinois is a wealthy lawyer with three women bent on marrying him: his mistress, a young widow, and his maid. He and his clerk's intended fiancée then fall in love. He gives all four women the same date and time for their wedding, and marries her.

== Cast ==
- Henri Garat : Jacques Badinois
- Josseline Gaël : Eloïse Duboucher
- Betty Stockfeld : Gladys Grey
- Mona Goya : Rose, the Badinois maid
- Pierre Stéphen : Hippolyte Loupiot, Badinois' clerk
- Armand Bernard : Séraphin Campluchard, undertaker
- Marguerite Moreno : Madame Mourillon
- Michèle Béryl : Monique Mourillon
- Marcel Vallée : Joseph Mourillon
- Jeanne Fusier-Gir : the Mourillon maid
- Jean Tissier : Claude Patrice, fashion designer
- Marcel Pérès : bailiff
- Albert Duvaleix
- Marie Cruz
- Willy Léardy
- Monique Monnier

== Release ==
Les Femmes collantes opened in Paris on 27 April 1938. It was re-released on video in 2015 by René Chateau Vidéo.
