= Bérangère Vattier =

- Born: June 13, 1941; Paris, France
- Died: 10 October 2001 (aged 60); Paris, France
- Occupation: Actress

Bérangère Vattier was a French comedian. She was born on 13 July 1941 in the 15th arrondissement of Paris and died of cancer on 10 October 2001 in the 12th arrondissement of Paris.

She was the daughter of comedian Robert Vattier, and was married to the actor Robert Etcheverry from 1963 to 1983. She is the niece of actress Nicole Vattier.

== Filmography ==
=== Films ===
- 1959: Faibles femmes, film by Michel Boisrond
- 1961: Par-dessus le mur, film by Jean-Paul Le Chanois
- 1972: L'Œuf by Félicien Marceau, film by Jean Vautrin : Justine Magis

=== Television ===
- 1961: Lady Windermere's Fan (L'Eventail de Lady Windermere), TV film by François Gir : Agatha
- 1961: Le Temps des copains, TV series by Robert Guez : Microbe
- 1962: Les Trois Chapeaux claques, TV film by Jean-Pierre Marchand : Sagra
- 1969: Agence Intérim (episode "Chaperon"), TV series by Marcel Moussy and Pierre Neurrisse : Patricia
- 1973: La Feuille de Bétel (based on the novel by Jeanne Cressanges), a téléroman by Odette Collet : Ti Bâ
- 1973: Le Renard et Les Grenouilles, a téléroman by Jean Vernier : Agnès Ferval
- 1973: Les Écrivains (based on the novel by Michel de Saint-Pierre), TV film by Robert Guez : Odette Merlot

=== Theater ===
- 1958: Gonzalo sent la violette by Robert Vattier and Albert Rieux, directed by Maurice Teynac, Théâtre Saint-Georges
- 1964: L'Année du bac by José-André Lacour, directed by Yves Robert, Théâtre Édouard VII
- 1965: Liolà by Luigi Pirandello, directed by Bernard Jenny, Théâtre du Vieux-Colombier
