= The Flashing Blade =

1967 French TV series

- Also known as: Le Chevalier Tempête
- Genre: Drama
- Written by: Andre Paul Antoine and P A Breal
- Directed by: Yannick Andrei
- Starring: Robert Etcheverry; Jacques Balutin; Denise Grey; Genevieve Casile; Jean Martinelli; Claude Gensac
- Country of origin: France
- Original language: French
- No. of series: 1
- No. of episodes: 12

Production
- Cinematography: Pierre Petit
- Running time: 20–25 minutes per episode

Original release
- Network: ORTF
- Release: 1 October – 21 October 1967

The Flashing Blade (French: Le Chevalier Tempête) is a French television serial made in the late 1960s. It was first broadcast in the UK on BBC children's television during the 1960s, with several re-runs throughout the 1970s. The British version of twelve 25 minutes episodes was created from the original four French 75-minute episodes.

The fictional story is based upon historical events during the War of the Mantuan Succession (1628–1631) between France and Spain and its allies. Duke Charles Emmanuel I of Savoy, a supporter of Spain, laid siege to Casale, the capital of Montferrat on the Savoie (Savoy) border. Despite numerous attempts to scale the defences, the beleaguered garrison held out. The Savoy army was eventually defeated by a French relief force on 18 March 1629.

The castle of Casale, seen being besieged in the opening credits, was filmed at Château Gaillard in France.

== Plot ==
The series revolves around the efforts of a dashing French spy to engineer the garrison's rescue. François, the Chevalier de Recci, and his servant Guillot are trapped in a besieged castle on the border between France and Spain. When the Spanish élite hear of a possible truce between France and Spain, some of them do not want a truce because the capture of the castle has greater strategic importance.

The Spanish begin a bombardment in order to capture the French castle before any form of ceasefire agreement is signed. The garrison commander, General Thoiras, recruits François and Gullot to break through Spanish lines to get word of the attack to the French Army. The pair, with their superior swordplay and horsemanship, embark on a daring mission evading capture, enemy spies and pursuing soldiers to deliver their message. The series ends with the Chevalier bringing news of the peace conference's decision to the Spanish Forces surrounding the castle.

== Cast ==
Actor	Character
Robert Etcheverry	The Chevalier de Recci (François)
Denise Grey	La Comtesse – The Duchess
Jacques Balutin	Guillot
Geneviève Casile	Isabelle de Sospel
Jean Martinelli	Duke de Sospel
Mario Pilar	Don Alonso
Claude Gensac	Mireille
Giani Esposito	Mazarin

== Production ==
Several cast members from The Flashing Blade appeared in similar serialised action productions for French children's TV. Desert Crusader was virtually identical to The Flashing Blade but set in 12th-century Palestine during the Third Crusade. The Aeronauts was set in the present day and featured a couple of daring French Air Force Mirage fighter pilots.

=== Broadcast ===
It was perhaps most notorious for the fact that on its last two (conventional) British broadcasts, the final episode lost vision through an apparent fault with the film stock; a considerable disappointment to its viewers after it had been running for many episodes over many weeks. The final few minutes of the last episode were later shown on Michael Aspel's "request a repeat" show Ask Aspel.

=== Theme tune ===
The theme song was "Fight" by The Musketeers (written by Alex Masters), which was issued on a Philips single in 1969.

=== Re-dubbed parody ===
In 1988, Andrew O'Connor, Kate Copstick, Bernadette Nolan and Terry Randall produced a spoof version which was broadcast on the Saturday morning children's show On the Waterfront. The scripts for the new comic soundtrack were written by Russell T Davies, who later went on to become an award-winning dramatist. This team reunited in 1995 for a one-off episode that was broadcast on Children's BBC for Red Nose Day. The parody version was followed by a re-run of the original series in the autumn of 1988.
