= Maurin of the Moors =

1932 film

- Directed by: André Hugon
- Written by: Paul Fékété
- Based on: Maurin of the Moors by Jean Aicard
- Starring: Antonin Berval; Jean Aquistapace; Nicole Vattier
- Cinematography: Marc Bujard; Georges Kostal
- Edited by: Louise Mazier
- Music by: Jacques Janin
- Production companies: C.F.F.R.; Films André Hugon
- Distributed by: Gaumont-Franco-Film-Aubert
- Release date: 2 December 1932
- Running time: 100 minutes
- Country: France
- Language: French

Maurin of the Moors (French: Maurin des Maures) is a 1932 French comedy film directed by André Hugon and starring Antonin Berval, Jean Aquistapace and Nicole Vattier. It is based on Jean Aicard's 1908 novel of the same name. In 1933, it was followed by a sequel The Illustrious Maurin, also directed by Hugon and starring Berval, Vattier and Aquistapace.

== Cast ==
- Antonin Berval as Maurin
- Jean Aquistapace as Pastoure
- Nicole Vattier as Tonia
- Jeanne Boitel as Madame Labarterie
- Rivers Cadet as Sandri
- Camille Bert as Brig. Orsini
- Émile Dehelly as Cabissol
- Pierre Finaly as Labarterie
- Paul Menant as Célestin Grondard
- José Davert as Grondard
- Geo Georgey as Grivolas
- Guillaumin as Lecorps
- Grinda as Saulnier
- Délia Col
- Janine Maubant

== Bibliography ==
- Dayna Oscherwitz & MaryEllen Higgins. The A to Z of French Cinema. Scarecrow Press, 2009.
