= Manslaughter (1922 film) =

1922 film

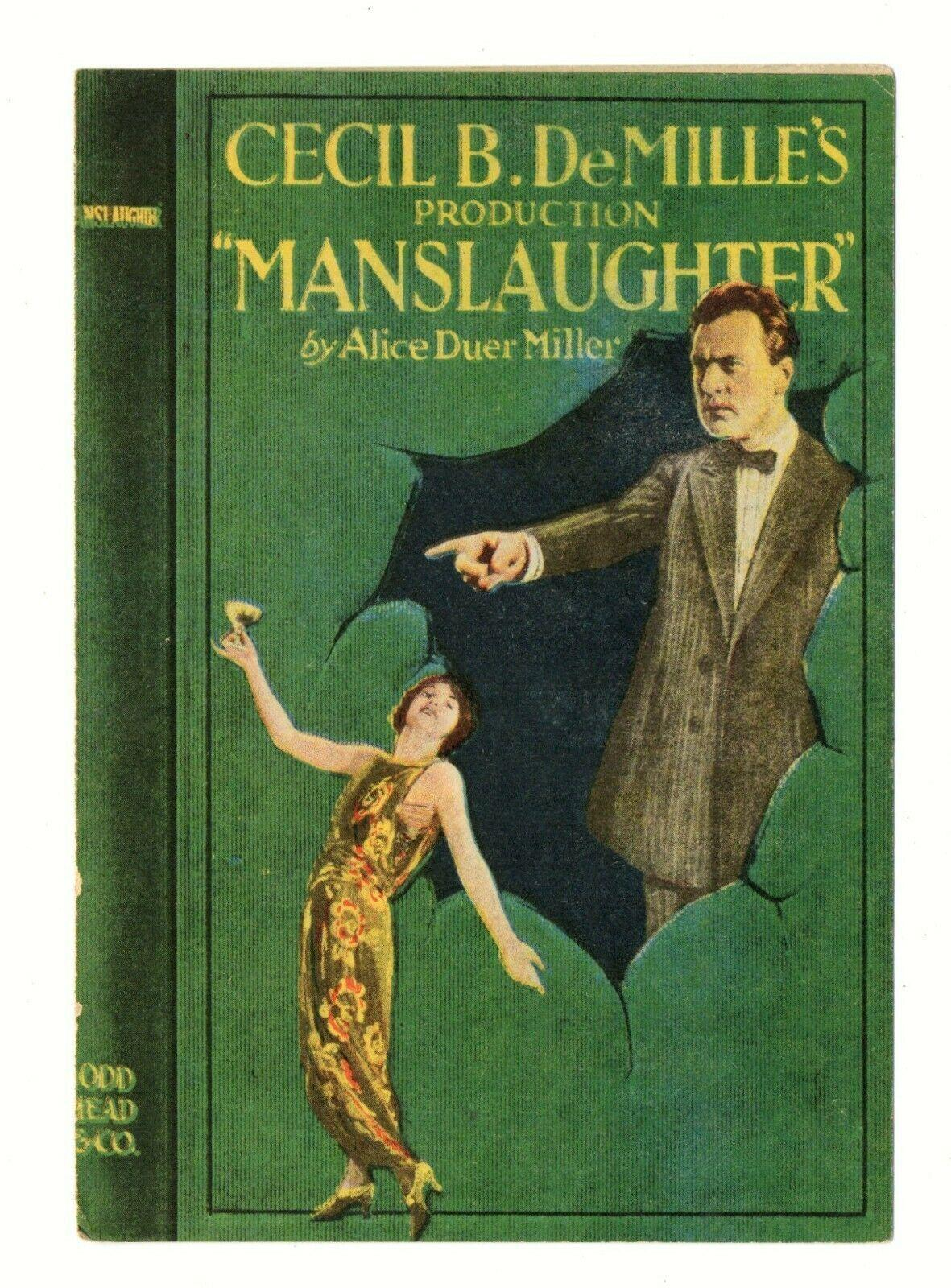
- Early edition of Alice Duer Miller's novel with images from DeMille's film on cover.
- Directed by: Cecil B. DeMille
- Written by: Jeanie MacPherson
- Based on: Manslaughter (1921 novel) by Alice Duer Miller
- Produced by: Cecil B. DeMille; Jesse L. Lasky
- Starring: Leatrice Joy; Thomas Meighan; Lois Wilson
- Cinematography: L. Guy Wilky; Alvin Wyckoff
- Edited by: Anne Bauchens
- Production company: Famous Players–Lasky
- Distributed by: Paramount Pictures
- Release date: September 24, 1922
- Running time: 100 minutes (10 reels; 9,061 feet)
- Country: United States
- Languages: Silent; English intertitles
- Budget: $385,000

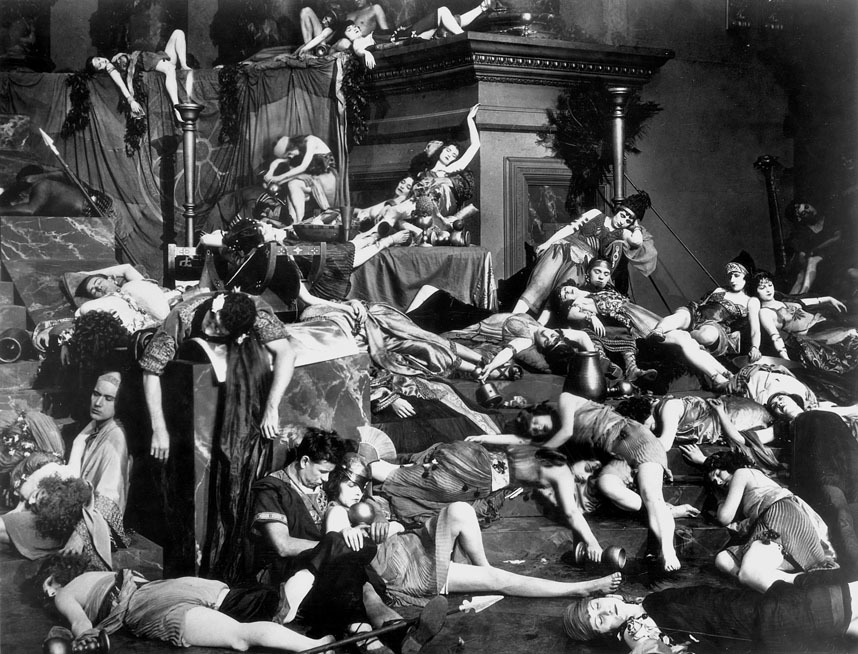
The famous orgy scene from the film.

Manslaughter (full film)

Manslaughter is a 1922 American silent drama film directed by Cecil B. DeMille and starring Thomas Meighan, Leatrice Joy, and Lois Wilson. It was scripted by Jeanie MacPherson adapted from the novel of the same name by Alice Duer Miller. Art direction and costumes for the film were done by Paul Iribe.

Manslaughter was cited by The Guinness Book of Movie Facts & Feats as being the first American feature film to show an erotic kiss between two members of the same sex.

The novel was adapted again by Paramount in 1930 and 1931 in French.

== Plot ==
The film portrays its main character, Lydia Thorne, as a thrill-seeking, self-entitled, and wild woman who does not have a reputation of thinking before acting. She acts selfishly by dancing with other men in the presence of her husband and not providing help to her maid who is in dire straits due to her son's health.

She is eventually taken to court after she crashes into a motorcycle cop during a high-speed chase. She is then prosecuted by her husband, Daniel O'Bannon, a lawyer, and is imprisoned for manslaughter. After her sentence, Lydia comes out of jail to find her husband has become an alcoholic.

== Cast ==
- Leatrice Joy as Lydia Thorne
- Thomas Meighan as Daniel J. O'Bannon
- Lois Wilson as Evans (Lydia's maid)
- John Miltern as Gov. Stephan Albee
- George Fawcett as Judge Homans
- Julia Faye as Mrs. Drummond
- Edythe Chapman as Adeline Bennett
- Jack Mower as Drummond (policeman)
- Dorothy Cumming as Eleanor Bellington
- Casson Ferguson as Bobby Dorest
- Michael D. Moore as Dicky Evans (as Mickey Moore)
- James Neill as Butler
- Sylvia Ashton as Prison matron
- Raymond Hatton as Brown
- Mabel Van Buren as Prisoner
- Ethel Wales as Prisoner
- Dale Fuller as Prisoner
- Edward Martindel as Wiley
- Charles Ogle as Doctor
- Guy Oliver as Musician
- Shannon Day as Miss Santa Claus
- Lucien Littlefield as Witness
- J. Farrell MacDonald (uncredited)

== Production ==
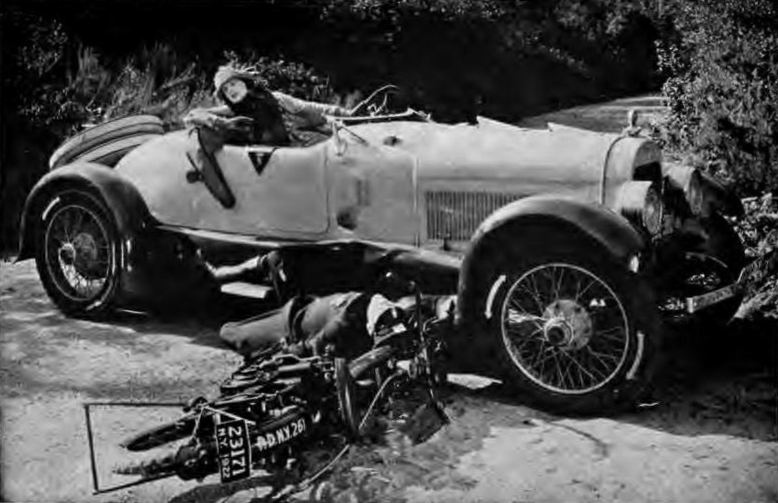
In this scene, Lydia causes the vehicle accident by stopping and the cop runs into her car with his motorcycle.

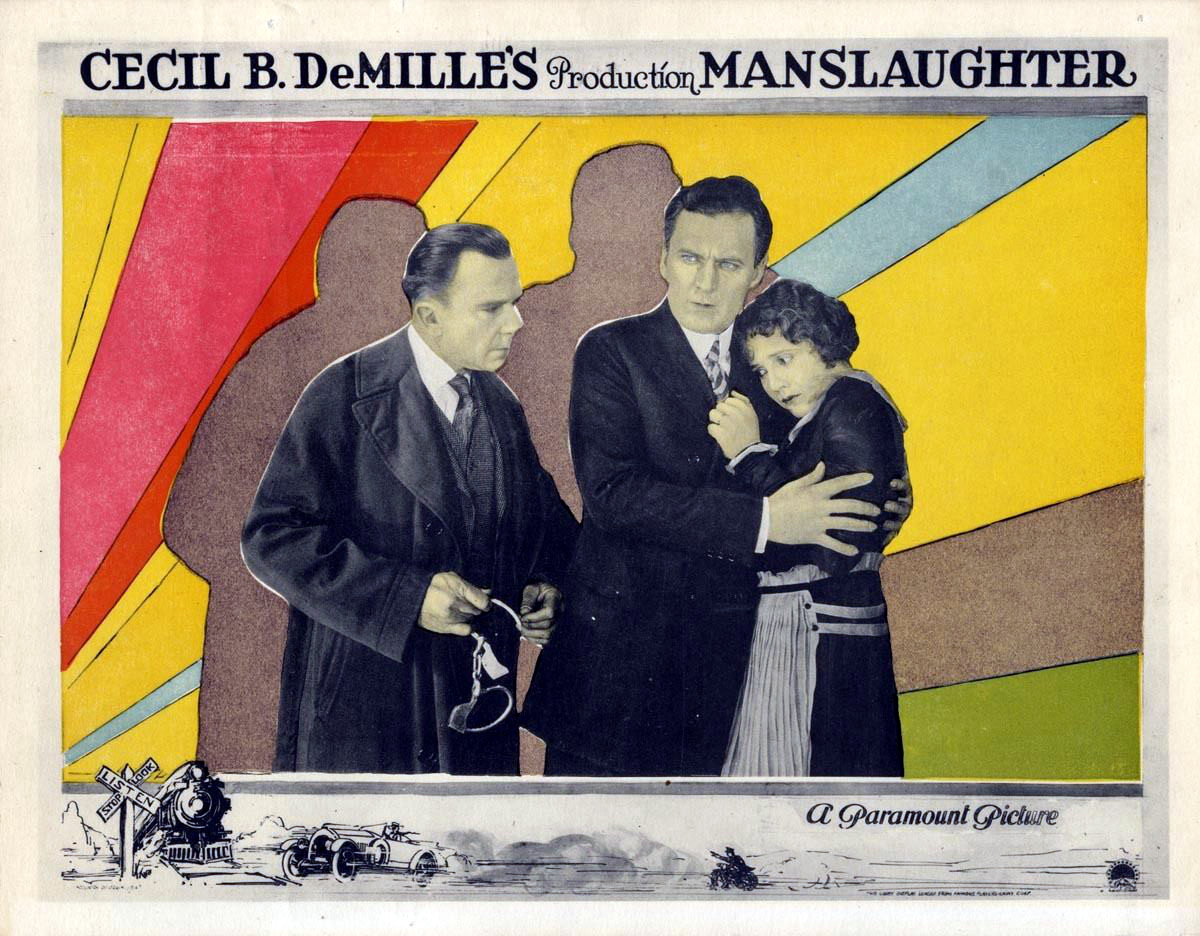
Poster advertisement for the film.

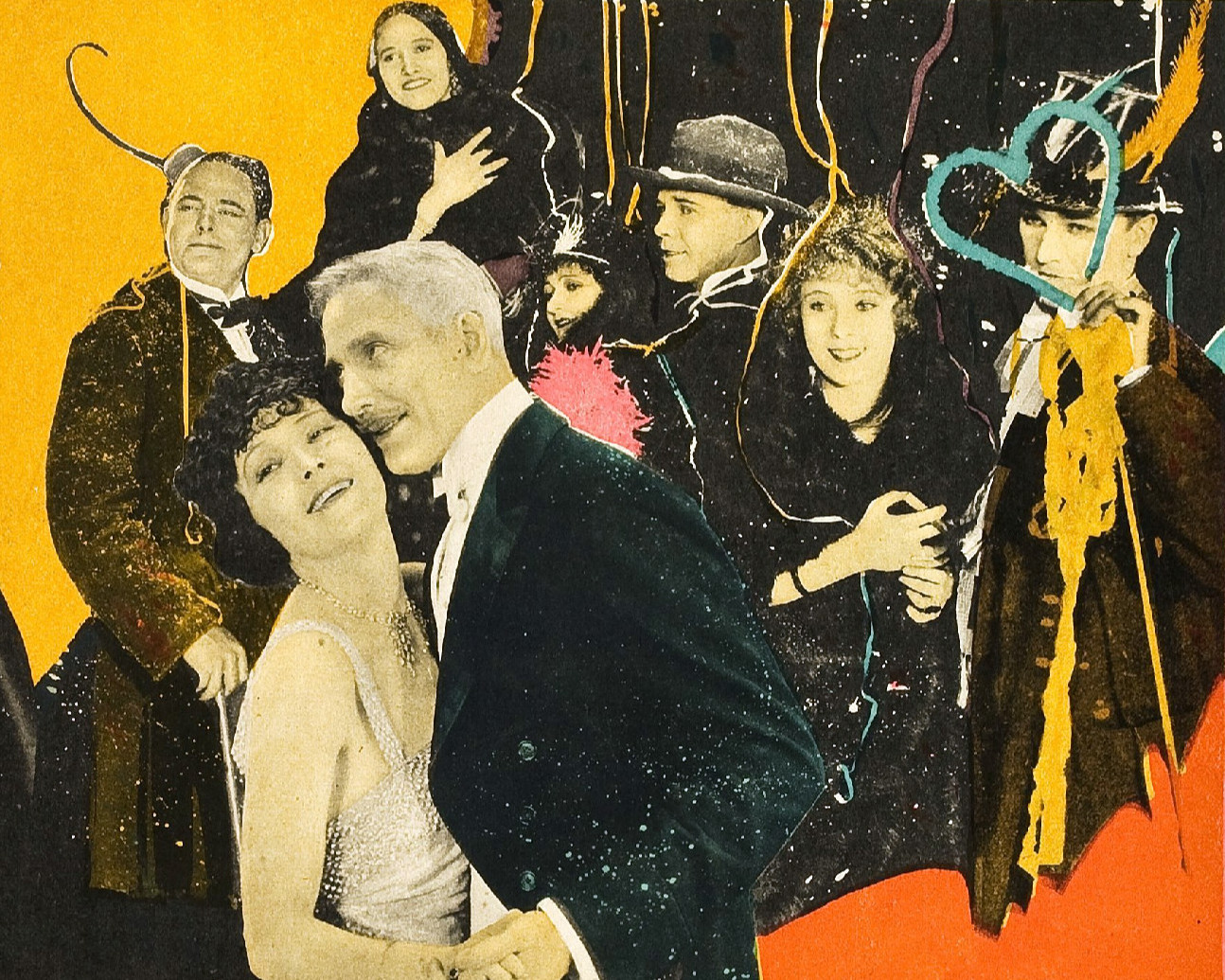
Manslaughter lobby card in 1922 with scene of the party

According to Leatrice Joy, in the scenes where she is chasing trains, it was extremely nerve-wracking because she had to drive the car, which had been fitted with a platform to support two cameramen and the director, plus equipment. Their safety depended entirely upon her skills as a motorist. During the shooting of a prison sequence, Joy burned her hand accidentally with soup in a prop cauldron; assistant director Cullen Tate had neglected to inform her that the soup was scalding hot.

Stuntman Leo Noomis broke his pelvis and six of his ribs during a stunt that required him to crash a motorcycle into a car.

== Reaction ==
Historian Kevin Brownlow notes that Joy and Wilson "both give far better performances than the film deserves." Film historian William K. Everson said "it is hard to believe that such a crude and unsubtle film could come from a veteran like De Mille; the amateurish and crudely faked chase scenes that start the film are of less technical slickness than Sennett had been getting ten years earlier. Manslaughter is exactly the kind of picture that the unknowing regard as typical of the silent film - overwrought, pantomimically acted, written in the manner of a Victorian melodrama, the kind of film that invites laughter at it rather than with it."

When a print was screened by Everson for Joy's daughter's birthday, the star of the film attended and saw it for the first time in forty years. According to Brownlow, "Miss Joy thought it hilarious."

== Preservation ==
Complete prints of Manslaughter are held by:

- George Eastman Museum (on 35 mm and 16 mm)
- Library of Congress (on 35 mm and 16 mm)
- Museum Of Modern Art
- EYE Filmmuseum.
- The Paul Killiam Collection at Worldview Entertainment
