= The Illustrious Maurin =

1933 film

- Directed by: André Hugon
- Written by: Paul Fékété
- Based on: The Illustrious Maurin by Jean Aicard
- Starring: Antonin Berval; Nicole Vattier; Jean Aquistapace
- Cinematography: Marc Bujard; Georges Kostal
- Music by: Jacques Janin
- Production company: Films André Hugon
- Distributed by: Gaumont-Franco-Film-Aubert
- Release date: 15 December 1933
- Running time: 122 minutes
- Country: France
- Language: French

The Illustrious Maurin (French: L'illustre Maurin) is a 1933 French comedy film directed by André Hugon and starring Antonin Berval, Nicole Vattier and Jean Aquistapace. It is based on the 1908 novel The Illustrious Maurin by Jean Aicard. The film's sets were designed by the art director Robert-Jules Garnier. It is a sequel to the 1932 film Maurin of the Moors also directed by Hugon, and starring Berval, Vattier and Aquistapace.

== Cast ==
- Antonin Berval as Maurin
- Nicole Vattier as Tonia
- Jean Aquistapace as Pastoure
- Armand Larcher as Césariot
- Délia Col as Madame Prévost
- Doumel as Capoutigue
- Jean Sinoël as Le curé
- Camille Bert
- Édouard Delmont
- Milly Mathis

== Bibliography ==
- Bessy, Maurice & Chirat, Raymond. Histoire du cinéma français: 1929-1934. Pygmalion, 1988.
- Crisp, Colin. Genre, Myth and Convention in the French Cinema, 1929-1939. Indiana University Press, 2002.
- O'Brien, Charles. Cinema's Conversion to Sound: Technology and Film Style in France and the US. Indiana University Press, 2005.
- Rège, Philippe. Encyclopedia of French Film Directors, Volume 1. Scarecrow Press, 2009.
