= Carlo Rim =

French screenwriter and film director

Carlo Rim (19 December 1902 – 3 December 1989) was a French film screenwriter, producer and director.

Born Jean Marius Richard, he made an anagram of his initials (RJM, treating I and J as the same letter) for his pseudonym, adding "Carlo" a popular Italian name in France at the time.

== Filmography ==
=== As screenwriter ===
- 1934 : Zouzou directed by Marc Allégret
- 1935 : Justin de Marseille directed by Maurice Tourneur
- 1935 : Gaspard de Besse directed by André Hugon
- 1936 : Le Mort en fuite directed by André Berthomieu
- 1936 : Tarass Boulba directed by Alexis Granowsky
- 1936 : Vingt-sept rue de la Paix directed by Richard Pottier
- 1936 : A Man to Kill directed by Léon Mathot
- 1937 : Blanchette directed by Pierre Caron
- 1937 : Hercule directed by Alexander Esway
- 1937 : The Secrets of the Red Sea directed by Richard Pottier
- 1937 : Êtes-vous jalouse ? directed by Henri Chomette
- 1937 : The Postmaster's Daughter directed by Victor Tourjansky
- 1938 : Education of a Prince directed by Alexander Esway
- 1939 : Sacred Woods directed by Léon Mathot
- 1941 : Parade en sept nuits directed by Marc Allégret
- 1942 : Simplet directed by Fernandel
- 1943 : Le Val d'enfer directed by Maurice Tourneur
- 1943 : La Ferme aux loups directed by Richard Pottier
- 1946 : L'Insaisissable Frédéric directed by Richard Pottier
- 1947 : Mirror directed by Raymond Lamy
- 1948 : City of Hope directed by Jean Stelli
- 1949 : Monseigneur directed by Roger Richebé
- 1950 : L'Amant de paille directed by Gilles Grangier
- 1954 : Secrets d'alcôve, sketch Le Lit de la Pompadour directed by Jean Delannoy

=== As a director and screenwriter or writer - adapter ===
- 1948 : The Cupboard Was Bare
- 1951 : La Maison Bonnadieu
- 1952 : Les Sept Péchés capitaux, for the sketch : La gourmandise
- 1953 : Virgile
- 1954 : Service Entrance
- 1956 : The Gangsters
- 1957 : This Pretty World
- 1959 : The Little Professor
- 1963 : Treize contes de Maupassant (television series)
- 1965 : Don Quixote (television series)
- 1976 : Le Sanglier de Cassis (television)

=== Actor ===
- 1942: Simplet directed by Fernandel
- 1957: Ce joli monde
- 1954: Secrets d'alcôve (idea) (segment Le Lit de la Pompadour)
- 1953: Virgile (screenwriter)
- 1952: Les sept péchés capitaux (scenario and dialogue)
- 1951: L'amant de paille (adaptation)
- 1949: Monseigneur (dialogues)
- 1948: L'armoire volante (original scenario)
- 1948: Cité de l'espérance (adaptation, dialogue)
- 1947: Miroir
- 1946: L'insaisissable Frédéric
- 1943: La ferme aux loups (dialogues, scenario)
- 1942: Simplet (dialogues, scenario)
- 1939: Le bois sacré (adaptation, scenario)
- 1938: Nostalgie (dialogue)
- 1938: Êtes-vous jalouse ? (dialogue, scenario)
- 1937: Les secrets de la Mer Rouge (adaptation, dialogue)
- 1937: L'homme à abattre
- 1936: 27 rue de la Paix (dialogue and scenario)
- 1936: Tarass Boulba (dialogue)
- 1935: Gaspard de Besse (dialogue and scenario)
- 1934: Zouzou
