= If You Return =

1938 film

- Directed by: Jacques Daniel-Norman
- Written by: Jacques Daniel-Norman; Maurice Marron; Fernand Méric
- Produced by: Fernand Méric
- Starring: Reda Caire; Jean Dunot; Nicole Vattier
- Cinematography: André Bac; Lucien Joulin
- Music by: Vincent Scotto
- Production company: Films Méric
- Release date: 23 February 1938
- Running time: 110 minutes
- Country: France
- Language: French

If You Return (French: Si tu reviens...) is a 1938 French romantic comedy film directed by Jacques Daniel-Norman and starring Reda Caire, Jean Dunot and Nicole Vattier. The film's sets were designed by the art director Robert Dumesnil.

== Cast ==
- Reda Caire as Jean Lemmonier
- Jean Dunot as François Itier
- Nicole Vattier as Claire Roux
- Jean Aquistapace as Le capitaine Polyte
- Mathilde Alberti as Annette
- Nane Chaubert as Nana
- Darlouis as Toine
- Crista Dorra as Juliette
- Farmy as Marius
- Geno Ferny as L'oncle Rolland
- Jacques Grétillat as Monsieur Itier
- Jane Lamy as Yvonne
- Germaine Lix as Madame Lemmonier
- Julien Maffre as Camoin
- Auguste Mouriès as Bernardou
- Henri Poupon as Maître Roux
- Germaine Sablon as Irène Delly
- Saint-Allier as Le directeur
- Elmire Vautier as Madame Itier
- Henri Vilbert as L'abbé

== Bibliography ==
- Bessy, Maurice & Chirat, Raymond. Histoire du cinéma français: 1935-1939. Pygmalion, 1986.
- Crisp, Colin. Genre, Myth and Convention in the French Cinema, 1929-1939. Indiana University Press, 2002.
- Rège, Philippe. Encyclopedia of French Film Directors, Volume 1. Scarecrow Press, 2009.
