= Gaspard de Besse =

1935 film

- Directed by: André Hugon
- Written by: Carlo Rim
- Based on: Gaspard de Besse by Jean Aicard
- Produced by: André Hugon
- Starring: Raimu; Antonin Berval; Nicole Vattier
- Music by: Jacques Janin
- Production company: Les Productions André Hugon
- Distributed by: Les Distributeurs Français
- Release date: 18 December 1935
- Running time: 100 minutes
- Country: France
- Language: French

Gaspard de Besse is a 1935 French historical adventure film directed by André Hugon and starring Raimu, Antonin Berval and Nicole Vattier. It is an adaptation of the 1919 novel of the same title by Jean Aicard. It is inspired by a historical figure active as a "Robin Hood" in pre-French Revolution Provence.

== Synopsis ==
After his father loses his house and possessions to a loan shark and is then murdered, Gaspard becomes an outlaw with his faithful sidekick Samplan. Their raids on the wealthy develop them a popular following in the countryside. However, both men ultimately come to a tragic end at the hands of the authorities.

== Cast ==
- Raimu as Samplan
- Antonin Berval as Gaspard
- Nicole Vattier as Thérèsel
- Milly Mathis as Toinon
- Janine Borelli as La voyageuse
- Jacqueline Laurent as La fille du geôlier
- Antoine Balpêtré as Cabasse
- Pierre Feuillère as Séraphin Cocarel
- Robert Vattier as La Griffe
- Pierre Juvenet as Le juge des Saquetes
- Paul Amiot as Le juge Cocarel
- Lucien Brulé as Le président Marin
- Georges Dorival as Mirabeau
- Jean Joffre as Maître Vincent
- Gaston Dubosc as Maître Bouis
- Armand Larcher as Pistolet
- Marcel Maupi as Tirebouchon
- Dalquier as Bedaine
- Fernand Flament as Le brigadier
- Frédéric Mariotti as Morillon

== Bibliography ==
- Goble, Alan. The Complete Index to Literary Sources in Film. Walter de Gruyter, 1999.
- Rège, Philippe. Encyclopedia of French Film Directors, Volume 1. Scarecrow Press, 2009.
- Temple, Michael & Witt, Michael (ed.) The French Cinema Book. Bloomsbury Publishing, 2018.
