= King of the Camargue (1922 film) =

1922 film

- Directed by: André Hugon
- Written by: André Hugon
- Based on: King of the Camargueby Jean Aicard
- Starring: Charles de Rochefort; Elmire Vautier; Claude Mérelle
- Cinematography: Karémine Mérobian
- Music by: Darius Milhaud; Henri Sauguet
- Production company: Films André Hugon
- Distributed by: Pathé Consortium Cinéma
- Release date: 20 January 1922
- Running time: 70 minutes
- Country: France
- Languages: Silent; French intertitles

King of the Camargue (French: Le roi de Camargue) is a 1922 French silent drama film directed by André Hugon and starring Charles de Rochefort, Elmire Vautier and Claude Mérelle. It is based on a novel of the same title by Jean Aicard, later remade as the 1935 sound film King of the Camargue.

== Cast ==
- Elmire Vautier as Lisette
- Claude Mérelle as La Zingara
- Marie-Laure as L'aïeule
- Charles de Rochefort as Renaud, le roi de Camargue
- Jean Toulout as Rampal

== Bibliography ==
- Goble, Alan. The Complete Index to Literary Sources in Film. Walter de Gruyter, 1999.
- Rège, Philippe. Encyclopedia of French Film Directors, Volume 1. Scarecrow Press, 2009.
