= King of the Camargue =

1935 film

- Directed by: Jacques de Baroncelli
- Written by: Henri Decoin
- Based on: King of the Camargue by Jean Aicard
- Produced by: Georges André-Cuel
- Starring: Antonin Berval; Simone Bourday; Paul Azaïs
- Cinematography: Georges Clerc; Nikolai Toporkoff
- Edited by: Jean Feyte
- Music by: Arthur Honegger; Roland Manuel
- Production company: Général Films
- Distributed by: Compagnie Universelle Cinématographique
- Release date: 24 January 1935
- Running time: 75 minutes
- Country: France
- Language: French

King of the Camargue (French: Roi de Camargue) is a 1935 French drama film directed by Jacques de Baroncelli and starring Antonin Berval, Simone Bourday and Paul Azaïs. It is based on a novel of the same title by Jean Aicard, previously adapted into the 1922 silent film King of the Camargue directed by André Hugon.

== Synopsis ==
Livette is engaged to Renaud, known as the "King of the Camargue", but after offending the gypsy Zinzara the latter tries to break up their relationship.

== Cast ==
- Antonin Berval as Renaud
- Simone Bourday as Livette
- Tela Tchaï as Zinzara
- Paul Azaïs as Titin
- Charles Vanel as Rampal
- Jean Périer as Audiffred

== Bibliography ==
- Crisp, Colin. Genre, Myth and Convention in the French Cinema, 1929-1939. Indiana University Press, 2002.
- Goble, Alan. The Complete Index to Literary Sources in Film. Walter de Gruyter, 1999.
- Rège, Philippe. Encyclopedia of French Film Directors, Volume 1. Scarecrow Press, 2009.
