= Lilian Greuze =

French model and actress

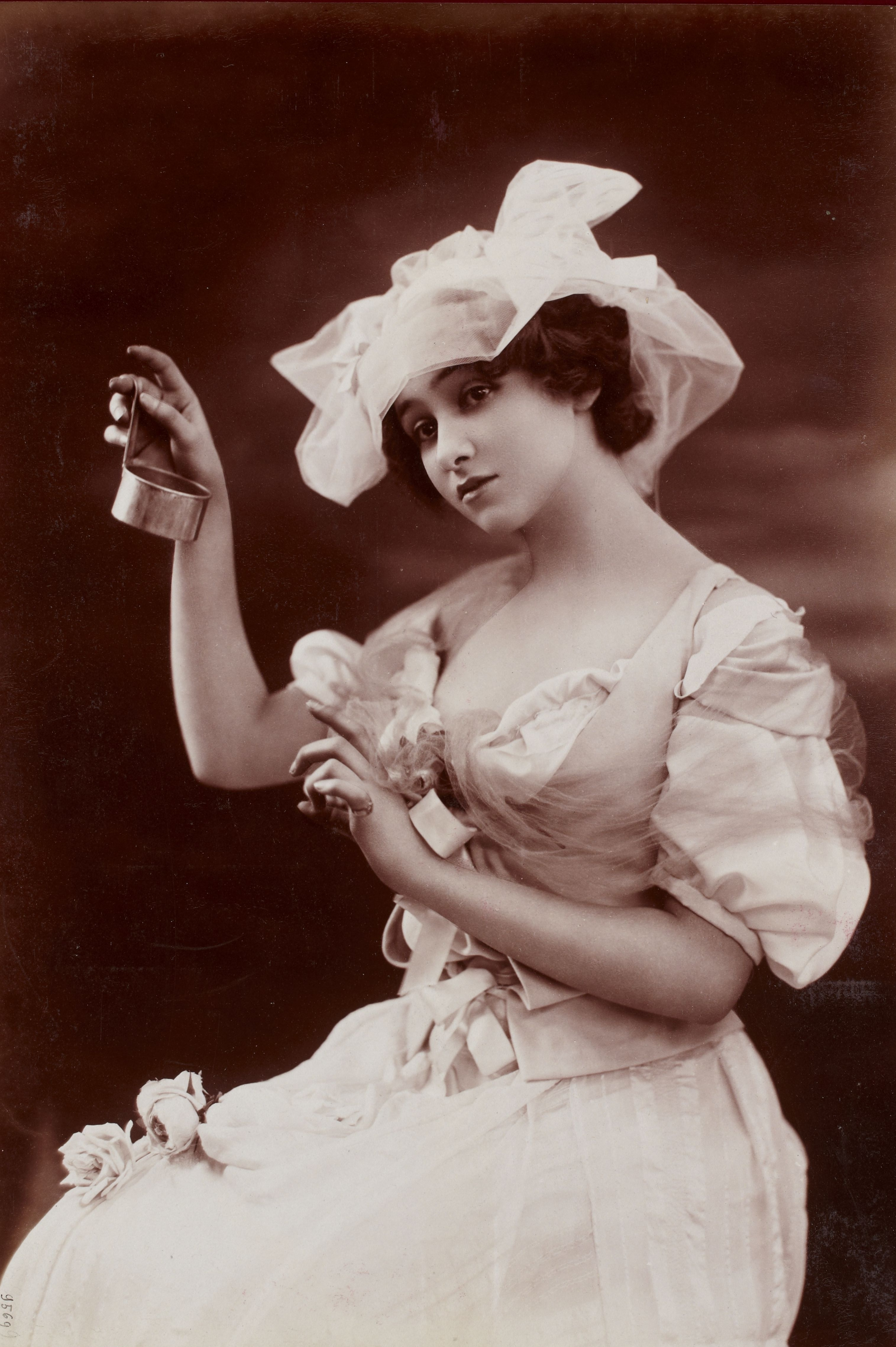
Lilian Greuze

Lilian Greuze (1890 – 1950) was a French model, and actress of the stage and screen. She was from Paris, France

== Theater ingenue (stock character) ==
She was a protégé of Sarah Bernhardt and performed at the French Theater on West 44th Street in Manhattan (New York). Her first New York appearance came during the 1915 theatrical season. Greuze was one of many French notables who were recruited by Lucien Laurent Bonheur, director of the French Theater.

She acted in a humorous sketch entitled English School in her first American stage performance. She was paired with George Ranavant. An observer remarked about her skill in speaking, So perfect was her enunciation and the modulation of her voice that every syllable could be heard distinctly in the rear of the auditorium.

In December 1915 she played with Paul Gavault at the French Theatre in Mademoiselle Josette Ma Femme. As Josette, Greuze portrayed the character which made Billie Burke famous. A reviewer commented favorably about her playful acting quality, citing her diverting gaminerie.

== Film actress ==
Greuze appeared as Marian Somerset in The Recoil (1917), with William Courtenay. The melodrama is a quickly paced story about trying to save an innocent man from being electrocuted by intervening with the governor. The Library of Congress has preserved an incomplete copy of this film. Reel one is missing.

Her acting career continued in France, Germany, and Italy until the 1930s. Greuze's filmography following The Recoil includes roles in Hier et aujord'hui (1918), Simone (1918), Tragedia senza lagrime (1919), Maître Bolbec et son mari (1934), Fanatisme (1934), and Bux the Clown (1935).

== Philanthropy ==
In November 1915 she was paid $200 for a kiss on the French liner Rochambeau. The ship was en route to New York and Greuze was passing a collection bag for charity. She overheard a man remark that he would donate the sum in return for a kiss from her. The money was contributed for the benefit of orphans of French dressmakers who were killed at the front in the war.

During World War I Greuze worked with the Red Cross at the French front in 1917. She was a nurse in a hospital at Neuilly from the beginning of the war. The hospital was conducted by Princess Henriette, Duchess of Vendôme and Alençon.
