= Arpad, the Gypsy =

- Starring: Robert Etcheverry
- Country of origin: France, Germany

Arpad, the Gypsy (French: Arpad le Tzigane, German: Arpad, der Zigeuner) is a Hungarian-French-German television film series which aired on ORTF in France and ZDF in Germany between 1973 and 1974. It starred Robert Etcheverry as Arpad.

== See also ==
- List of German television series
