= Manslaughter (1930 film) =

1930 film

- Film poster
- Directed by: George Abbott
- Written by: George Abbott (adaptation); Alice Duer Miller (novel)
- Starring: Claudette Colbert; Fredric March
- Cinematography: Archie Stout
- Edited by: Otho Lovering
- Music by: Karl Hajos
- Distributed by: Paramount Pictures
- Release date: July 23, 1930
- Running time: 85 minutes
- Country: United States
- Language: English

Manslaughter is a 1930 American pre-Code drama film directed by George Abbott, and starring Claudette Colbert and Fredric March. An original print of the film is saved in the UCLA Film and Television Archive. This film is a sound remake of Cecil B. DeMille's 1922 silent classic Manslaughter. Paramount also released a French-language version of this 1930 film as The Indictment, directed by Dimitri Buchowetzki.

== Plot ==
A wealthy young woman in an attempt to avoid a speeding ticket, causes an accident that results in the death of the pursuing police officer.

== Cast ==
- Claudette Colbert as Lydia Thorne
- Fredric March as Dan O'Bannon
- Emma Dunn as Miss Bennett
- Natalie Moorhead as Eleanor Bellington
- Richard Tucker as J.P. Albee
- Hilda Vaughn as Louise Evans
- G. Pat Collins as John Drummond
- Steve Pendleton as Bobby
- Stanley Fields as Peters
- Arnold Lucy as Piers
- Ivan F. Simpson as Morson
- George Chandler as Roadside Observer
