= Léon Gandillot =

French playwright (1862–1912)

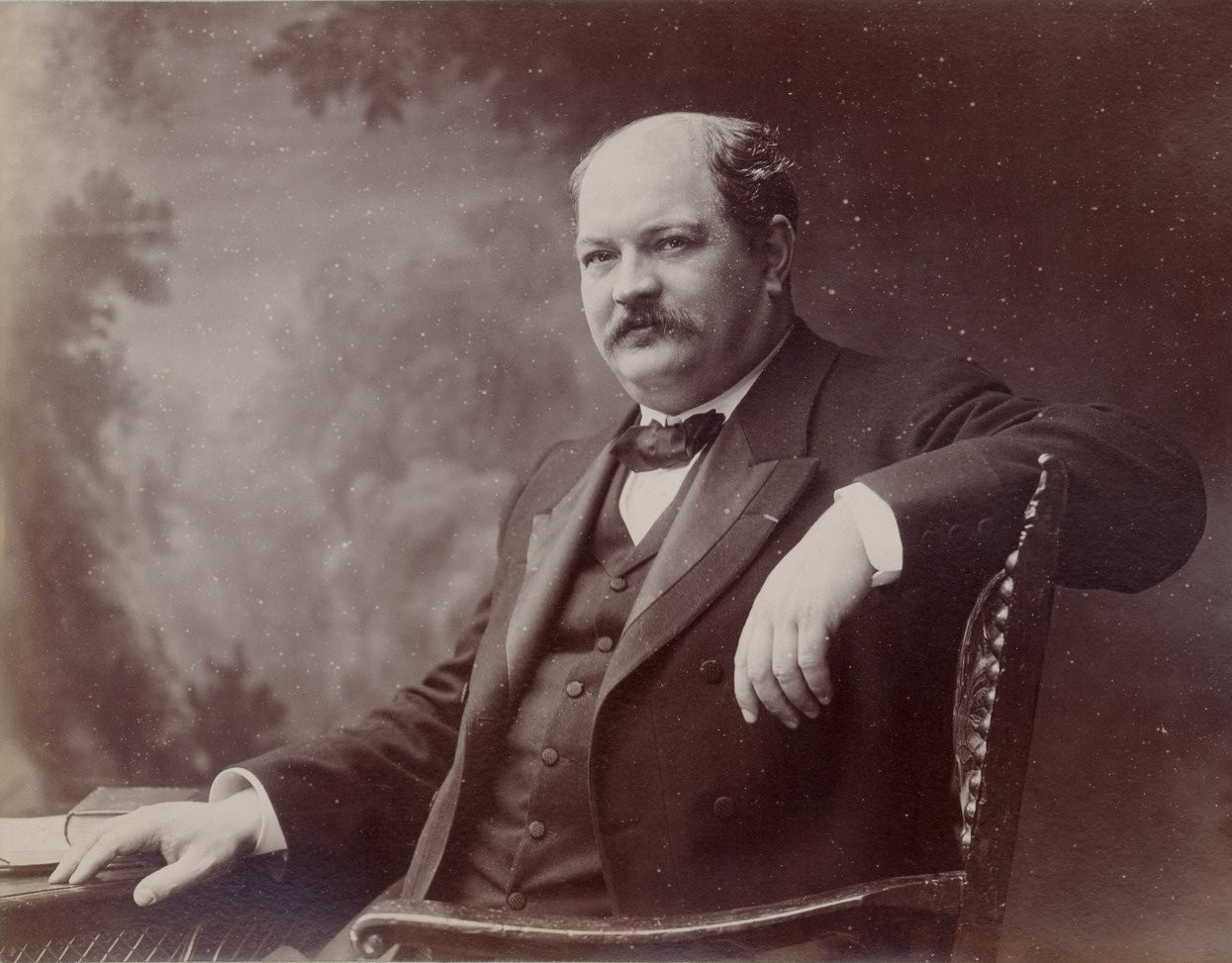
- Born: 20-25 January 1862; 9th arrondissement of Paris, France
- Died: 26 September 1912 (aged 50); Neuilly-sur-Seine, France
- Occupation: Playwright

Léon Gandillot (French: [leɔn ɡɑ̃dijo]; 20-25 January 1862 – 21 September 1912) was a French playwright.

Gandillot was the nephew of the librettist and dramatist Hector Crémieux. In 1886, his first comédie en vaudeville Les Femmes collantes gave him the opportunity to be known very quickly. He later gained other successes with comedies such as La Mariée récalcitrante, La Course aux jupons, and Ferdinand le noceur. Two of these plays have until now been adapted to film: Les Femmes collantes twice, in 1919 by Georges Monca and in 1938 by Pierre Caron as well as Ferdinand le noceur in 1934 by René Sti.

== Works ==
- 1886: Les femmes collantes, comédie-bouffe in 5 acts; Paul Ollendorff
- 1887: Les filles de Jean de Nivelle, novel, H. Kistemaeckers
- 1887: Le fumeron, comedy in 1 act; Paul Ollendorff
- 1887: Vers amoureux, collection of poems; Alphonse Piaget
- 1887: Contes à la lune, short stories; Librairie illustrée
- 1888: Entre conjoints !, short story; H. Kistemaeckers
- 1888: Un rendez-vous, comedy in i act; Paul Ollendorff
- 1888: Tes seins, poems; Librairie nouvelle
- 1889: La mariée récalcitrante, comédie-bouffe in cinq acts; Paul Ollendorff
- 1890: La course aux jupons, comedy in 3 acts; Paul Ollendorff
- 1890: La Diva en tournée, comedy in 1 act; Paul Ollendorff
- 1890: L'Enlèvement de Sabine, comédie-bouffe in 3 acts; Paul Ollendorff
- 1890: Le Gros lot, comedy in 1 act; Paul Ollendorff
- 1891: Bonheur à quatre, comedy in 3 acts; Paul Ollendorff
- 1891: De fil en aiguille, scènes de la vie folâtre in 4 days; Paul Ollendorff
- 1892: Le Pardon, comedy in 3 acts; Paul Ollendorff
- 1892: La Tournée Ernestin, comédie inédite in 4 acts
- 1893: Le Sous-Préfet de Château-Buzard, comédie inédite in 3 acts
- 1893: Le Supplice d'un Auvergnat, comedy in 1 act, mingled with song; Paul Ollendorff
- 1894: Les Dames du Plessis-Rouge, five-act play; Paul Ollendorff
- 1894: Une Femme facile, comedy in 1 act; Paul Ollendorff
- 1895: Associés !, comedy in 3 acts; Paul Ollendorff
- 1895: La Cage aux lions, comédie-bouffe inédite in 3 acts
- 1895: Ferdinand le noceur, comedy in 1 act; l'Illustration
- 1896: La Tortue, comédie inédite in 3 acts
- 1896: La Villa Gaby, comédie inédite in 3 acts; l'Illustration
- 1897: Madame Jalouette, comédie inédite in 3 acts
- 1898: L'Amorceur, comédie inédite in 4 acts
- 1900: Zigomar, pièce inédite in 3 acts
- 1901: Radinol a du coton !, comédie-bouffe inédite in 3 acts (in collaboration with M. Landais)
- 1905: Le Devoir conjugal, comédie inédite in 3 acts
- 1905: Vers l'amour, five-act play; l'Illustration
- 1909: Euterpé ambigua, texte; Société Internationale de musicologie
- 1909: L'Ex, comédie inédite in 4 acts
- 1910: Les Pigeonnettes, comédie-bouffe inédite in 3 acts (in collaboration with Alphonse de Beil)
- 1911: Sauvé des eaux, comédie inédite in 1 act; Je sais tout
