= The Escape to Nice =

1932 film directed by James Bauer

- Directed by: James Bauer
- Written by: Hans Mahner-Mons (novel); Walter Schlee; Walter Wassermann
- Starring: Fritz Fischer; Georg Alexander; Else Elster; Betty Bird
- Cinematography: Otto Kanturek; Bruno Timm
- Edited by: Martha Dübber
- Music by: Franz Doelle
- Production company: Renaissance-Film
- Release date: 14 June 1932
- Running time: 91 minutes
- Country: Germany
- Language: German

The Escape to Nice (German: Flucht nach Nizza) is a 1932 German comedy crime film directed by James Bauer and starring Fritz Fischer, Georg Alexander and Else Elster. The film is based on the novel Orje Lehmann wird Detektiv by Dolly Bruck (Hans Mahner-Mons). It was shot at the Halensee Studios in Berlin and on location in London and Nice. The film's sets were designed by the art director Franz Schroedter. It premiered on 14 June 1932.

== Cast ==
- Fritz Fischer as Hugo Lehmann
- Georg Alexander as Fritz Butenschön
- Else Elster as Irene Dippel
- Gerhard Dammann as Ihr Vater
- Betty Bird as Ramona Novalez
- Hedwig Wangel as Ramonas Mutter
- Max Gülstorff as Kommissar Grimm
- Egon Brosig as Herr Harnisch
- Theo Lingen as Herr Bock
- Hermann Picha as Herr Fiedler
- Philipp Manning as Der Inspektor
- Angelo Ferrari
- Erich Fiedler
- Gerti Ober
- Hans Ritter
- Alexandra Schmitt
- Lotte Steinhoff

== Bibliography ==
- Grange, William (2008). Cultural Chronicle of the Weimar Republic. Scarecrow Press. ISBN 978-0-8108-5967-8.
