= Hans Mahner-Mons =

German film producer (1883–1956)

- Born: 19 April 1883; Hildburghausen, German Empire
- Died: 11 October 1956 (aged 73); West Germany
- Other name: Hans Possendorff
- Occupations: Writer, librettist

Hans Mahner-Mons (1883–1956) was a German writer. He was known particularly for his novels and his librettos for opera. He provided the libretto for the 1930 operetta Das Herz. Several films were made based on his works, including The Sensational Casilla Trial in 1939. He was also known by the pen name Hans Possendorff.

== Selected filmography ==
- Klettermaxe (1927)
- Hasenklein kann nichts dafür (1932)
- The Escape to Nice (1932)
- Bux the Clown (1935)
- Make-Up (1937)
- The Sensational Casilla Trial (1939)
- Klettermaxe (1952)

== Bibliography ==
- Giesen, Rolf. Nazi Propaganda Films: A History and Filmography. McFarland & Company, 2003.
- Goble, Alan. The Complete Index to Literary Sources in Film. Walter de Gruyter, 1999.
- Magilow, Danel H. The Photography of Crisis: The Photo Essays of Weimar Germany. Pennsylvania State University Press, 2012.
