= Ferdinand the Roisterer =

1935 film

- Directed by: René Sti
- Written by: Georges Berr; Jacques Constant; René Sti
- Based on: Ferdinand le noceur by Léon Gandillot
- Produced by: Ayres d'Aguiar
- Starring: Fernandel; Paulette Dubost; André Alerme
- Cinematography: Charles Bauer; Fred Langenfeld
- Edited by: Jacques Desagneaux
- Music by: Casimir Oberfeld
- Production company: Gamma Film
- Distributed by: Gray-Film
- Release date: 22 February 1935
- Running time: 100 minutes
- Country: France
- Language: French

Ferdinand the Roisterer (French: Ferdinand le noceur) is a 1935 French comedy film directed by René Sti and starring Fernandel, Paulette Dubost and André Alerme. The film is based on 1895 one-act play of the same title by Léon Gandillot. It was shot at the Cité Elgé studios of Gaumont in Paris. The film's sets were designed by the art director Pierre Schild.

== Synopsis ==
Monsieur Fourageot, the manager of a chemical laboratory is a frequent womaniser. However he is concerned about his young, pretty and outgoing daughter and makes several efforts to constrain her behaviour. He ultimately settles on marrying her to one of his employees, the well-meaning and virtuous Ferdinand. Then he hears a rumour that Ferdinand is himself a hardened reveller at night.

== Cast ==
- Fernandel as Ferdinand Piat
- Paulette Dubost as Paulette Fourageot
- André Alerme as Fourageot
- Félix Oudart as Colonel Paturin
- Julien Carette as Farjol
- Romain Bouquet as Bertimey
- Marcel Maupi as Casimir
- Louis Scott as Labricelle
- Pauline Carton as Mme Paturin
- Jane Marken as Mme Bertimey
- Madeleine Guitty as Rose
- Nadine Picardas Armandine
- Yvonne Legeay as Mme Yvonne
- Suzy Delair as Pamela

== Bibliography ==
- Bessy, Maurice & Chirat, Raymond. Histoire du cinéma français: 1935-1939. Pygmalion, 1986.
- Crisp, Colin. Genre, Myth and Convention in the French Cinema, 1929-1939. Indiana University Press, 2002.
- Goble, Alan. The Complete Index to Literary Sources in Film. Walter de Gruyter, 1999.
- Rège, Philippe. Encyclopedia of French Film Directors, Volume 1. Scarecrow Press, 2009.
