= Jean Aquistapace =

French actor and opera singer

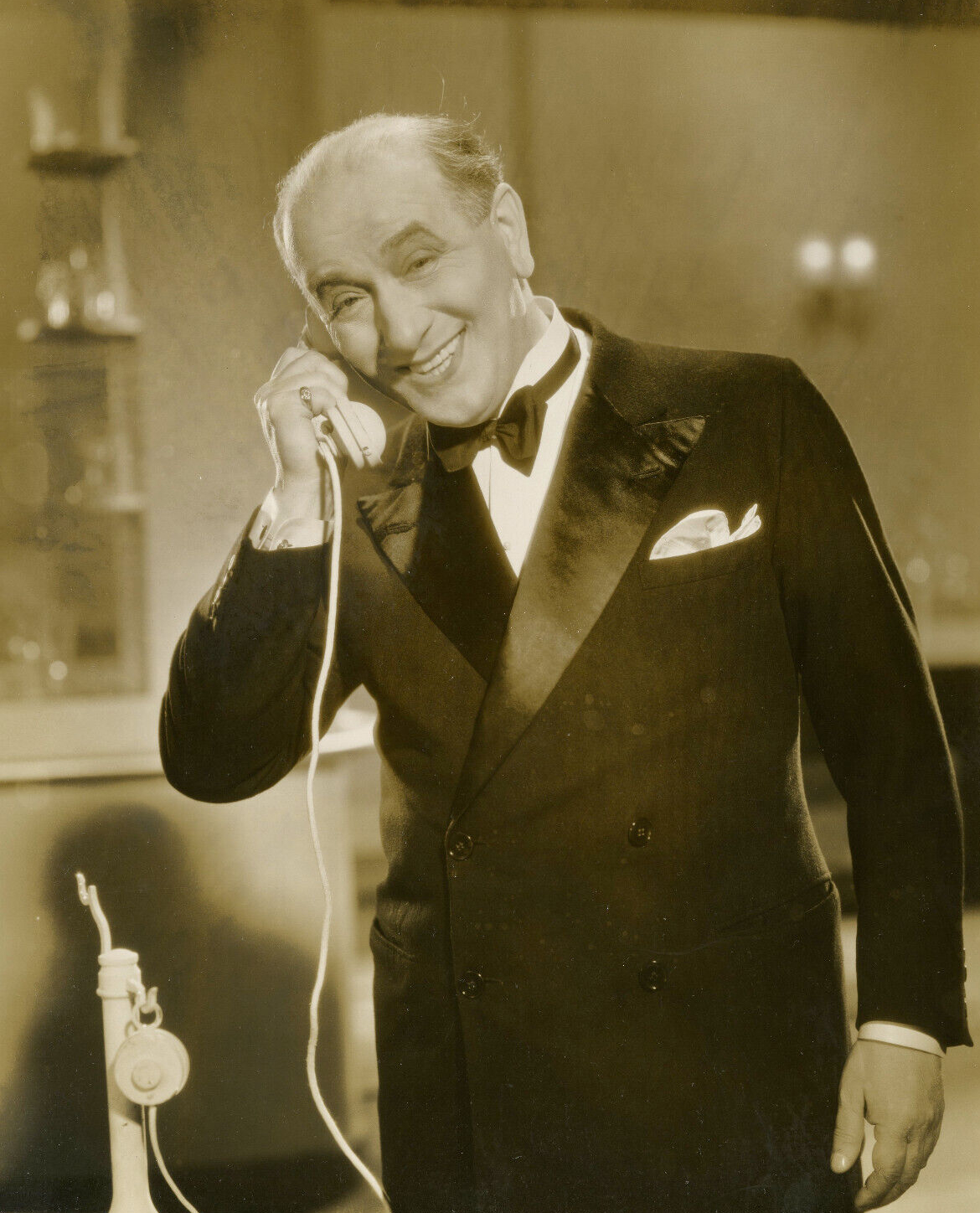
- Aquistapace in My Heart Hesitates (1932)
- Born: 22 August 1882; Nice, Alpes-Maritimes, France
- Died: 20 October 1952 (aged 70); Nice, Alpes-Maritimes, France
- Occupations: Actor, singer
- Years active: 1932–1950 (film)

Jean Aquistapace (1882–1952) was a French actor and opera singer. He appeared in around thirty films during the 1930s and 1940s.

== Selected filmography ==
- Maurin of the Moors (1932)
- The Wonderful Day (1932)
- The Illustrious Maurin (1933)
- Madame Angot's Daughter (1935)
- Count Obligado (1935)
- Romarin (1937)
- If You Return (1938)
- Ramuntcho (1938)
- The Corsican Brothers (1939)
- Girls in Distress (1939)
- The Marvelous Night (1940)
- Facing Destiny (1940)
- The Beautiful Adventure (1942)
- Arlette and Love (1943)
- Passion for Life (1949)

== Bibliography ==
- Blakeway, Claire. Jacques Prévert: Popular French Theatre and Cinema. Fairleigh Dickinson University Press, 1990.
