= Antonin Berval =

French actor

- Born: 12 September 1891; Avignon, France
- Died: 14 October 1966 (aged 75); Nice, France
- Other names: Antonin Pasteur; Berval
- Occupation: Actor
- Years active: 1923–1959 (film)

Antonin Berval (1891–1966) was a French film actor. He is sometimes credited simply as Berval.

== Selected filmography ==
- Notre Dame d'amour (1923)
- Arthur (1931) - Hubert de Fondragon
- Le costaud des PTT (1931)
- To the Polls, Citizens (1932) - Un électeur à voix
- Si tu veux (1932) - Renaud
- Maurin of the Moors (1932) - Maurin
- Les vingt-huit jours de Clairette (1933) - Vivarel
- The Illustrious Maurin (1933) - Maurin
- Chourinette (1934) - Vernonet
- King of the Camargue (1935) - Renaud
- Justin de Marseille (1935) - Justin
- Gaspard de Besse (1935) - Gaspard
- Le roman d'un spahi (1936) - Saint-Hilaire
- Notre-Dame d'amour (1936) - Jean Pastorel
- Temptation (1936) - Robert
- Romarin (1937) - Tonin
- Franco de port (1937) - Monsieur Fred
- Un soir à Marseille (1938) - L'inspectuer Francis
- Firmin, le muet de Saint-Pataclet (1938) - Firmin
- Une java (1939) - Yann
- Quartier sans soleil (1939) - Bébert
- Cap au large (1942) - Simon
- La chèvre d'or (1943) - Galfar
- Le cabaret du grand large (1946) - Le commissaire Thomas
- L'homme traqué (1947) - Victor
- Mirror (1947) - Folco
- Mandrin (1947) - Général La Morlière
- Three Investigations (1948) - L'inspecteur de police Thomas
- If It Makes You Happy (1948) - Viala
- The Cupboard Was Bare (1948) - Grand Charles
- The Red Angel (1949) - Antonin Baretta
- The Ferret (1950) - L'inspecteur Vignolles
- The Adventurers of the Air (1950) - Docquois
- Oriental Port (1950) - Capitaine Palmade
- Dakota 308 (1951) - L'inspecteur Baron
- Serenade to the Executioner (1951) - Inspecteur Léon Fourasse
- Village Feud (1951) - Le père Gari
- In the Land of the Sun (1952) - L'inquiet
- The Baker of Valorgue (1953) - Noël Courtade dit Courtecuisse
- Naked in the Wind (1953) - Farigoule
- Carnival (1953) - Le commissaire
- Le club des 400 coups (1953) - M. de Saint-Febvrier
- Les détectives du dimanche (1953)
- The Blonde Gypsy (1953) - Léon Barcarin
- Dangerous Turning (1954)
- House on the Waterfront (1955) - Léon
- The Light Across the Street (1955) - Albert
- Speaking of Murder (1957) - Zé
- L'aventurière des Champs-Élysées (1957) - Pérez
- Paris clandestin (1957) - Bramati
- A Kiss for a Killer (1957) - Le maire
- Les Truands (1957) - Le troisième fils Benoit
- Nuits de Pigalle (1959) - Bob, l'imprésario (final film role)

== Bibliography ==
- Goble, Alan. The Complete Index to Literary Sources in Film. Walter de Gruyter, 1999.
