= Das Herz =

Opera by Hans Pfitzner

Das Herz is a German-language opera by Hans Pfitzner to a libretto by Hans Mahner-Mons. It received concurrent premieres in 1930 in Berlin and Munich.

== Recordings ==
- Das Herz - Andre Wenhold (baritone), Volker Horn (tenor), Roberta Cunningham (soprano), Beth Johanning (soprano), Gerhard Stephan (bass) Thuringian Landestheater Chorus, Thuringian Symphony Orchestra Rolf Reuter 2CD Marco Polo 1993
