= On the Waterfront (TV series) =

- Genre: Children's
- Presented by: Andrew O'Connor; Bernadette Nolan; Kate Copstick; Terry Randall
- Country of origin: United Kingdom
- Original language: English
- No. of series: 2
- No. of episodes: 24

Production
- Running time: 115 minutes

Original release
- Network: BBC1
- Release: 23 April 1988 – 8 July 1989

On the Waterfront is a British children's television series that aired on BBC1 from 23 April 1988 to 8 July 1989. The programme aired on Saturday mornings and was filmed at Brunswick Dock, Liverpool. It consisted of comedy sketches interspersed with cartoons, competitions and music.

The writer Russell T Davies, later a BAFTA Award-winner for his work on programmes such as Queer as Folk and Doctor Who, worked on the series, writing the script for a comedy dubbed version of the French children's drama series The Flashing Blade.

The series is notable in giving the human and puppet double-act Bodger and Badger their first TV exposure.

== Transmissions ==
Series	Start date	End date	Episodes
1	23 April 1988	9 July 1988	12
2	22 April 1989	8 July 1989	12
