= Muche =

1927 film

- Directed by: Robert Péguy
- Written by: Robert Péguy
- Produced by: Noë Bloch; Gregor Rabinovitch
- Starring: Nicolas Koline; Elmire Vautier; Madeleine Guitty
- Cinematography: Fédote Bourgasoff; Joseph-Louis Mundwiller
- Production company: Ciné-Alliance
- Release date: 8 June 1927
- Country: France
- Languages: Silent; French intertitles

Muche is a 1927 French silent comedy drama film directed by Robert Péguy and starring Nicolas Koline, Elmire Vautier and Madeleine Guitty. The film's sets were designed by the art director Alexandre Lochakoff. Location shooting took place in Biarritz.

== Cast ==
- Nicolas Koline as Muche / Poum
- Elmire Vautier as Madame Lubin
- Madeleine Guitty as La cabaretière
- Jean Aymé as André Rivolet
- Alexej Bondireff as Bourrache, agent de sûreté
- Jean-François Martial as L'Apache

== Bibliography ==
- Goble, Alan. The Complete Index to Literary Sources in Film. Walter de Gruyter, 1999.
- Rège, Philippe. Encyclopedia of French Film Directors, Volume 1. Scarecrow Press, 2009.
