= Joan Warner =

American burlesque performer (1912–2002)

- Born: Joanne Warner Eichelberger; November 9, 1912; Narberth, Pennsylvania, U.S.
- Died: May 2, 2002 (aged 89)
- Occupation: Fan dancer
- Spouse: Richard Gerben Visser (m. 1950; died 1998)

Joanne Warner Visser (née Eichelberger; November 9, 1912 – May 2, 2002) was an American fan dancer who was put on trial for indecent exposure in Paris, France, in 1935. She was a rival of Sally Rand when she danced in Chicago, Illinois.

== Early life and dancing career ==
Warner was born Narberth, Pennsylvania on November 9, 1912, as Joanne Warner Eichelberger to Samuel E. Eichelberger and Carolyn Halsey. She was raised in Washington, D.C., studying there and in New York City. She was three years old when she began dancing. She was slender, quite tall, very blonde, with blue eyes. She danced in Hollywood in 1933 before moving on to Chicago. where she entertained at the Royal Frolics. Warner made appearances in Miami, Florida, Palm Beach, and New Orleans. In the latter city she was persuaded to go abroad by an English producer.

Warner danced unimpeded in Paris music halls and cabarets beginning in the spring of 1934. She encountered legal difficulties when numerous imitators of her shows began to perform at different venues. Warner mostly appeared nude solely in dim lighted cabarets where she was not especially close to her audience. She wore a fan and sometimes a pair of iron bracelets during her performances. She appeared at the Bagdad, a tea-dancing restaurant in the Champs Elysees. She was arrested there and the club was forced to close for a day before its license was restored. She soon obtained an engagement at the Alcazar and received top billing at Bal Tabarin.

== Morality lawsuit ==
Warner appeared in a French court beginning in July 1935 on a charge of "offending public modesty". The suit was brought by the Association for the Increase of the French Population. She was cited for a violation of Article 330 of the French code. It dealt with the extent to which a person could be legally undressed in public. It was also contended that during one dance she came too close to the floor space designated for spectators.

Warner argued for the art in her dance routine. She said she was covered from head to foot with white makeup and an invisible lavender silk cloth covered me in my absolutely correct positions. Her defense was supported by noted aviators, novelists, a zoology professor, and a painter, Maurice de Vlaminck. The latter read a text about artistic nudity and said that he was not shocked by nakedness.

On July 18 the Tenth Correctional Chamber fined Warner fifty francs. The judicial body ruled "it is against the law of the French Republic to dance in the nude, however artistically one may dance". The small fine imposed implied that the court was lenient. It mostly took exception to the dances being advertised as "nude" when actually they gave an impression of complete nudity. Specifically, the court elaborated that it was hard to distinguish "between what was art and what was lewdness".

== Personal life and death ==
Warner married Richard Gerben Visser (1906–1998) in New Orleans, Louisiana in August 1950. She died on May 2, 2002, at the age of 89.

== Selected filmography ==
- Bux the Clown (1935)
- Cinderella (1937)
