= Cinderella (1937 film) =

1937 film

- Directed by: Pierre Caron
- Written by: Jean Montazel
- Produced by: Jack Forrester; Jean Lévy-Srauss; André Parant
- Starring: Joan Warner; Christiane Delyne; Maurice Escande; Suzanne Dehelly
- Cinematography: Boris Kaufman
- Music by: Vincent Scotto
- Production company: Forrester-Parant Productions
- Distributed by: Forrester-Parant Productions
- Release date: 1 July 1937
- Running time: 95 minutes
- Country: France
- Language: French

Cinderella is a 1937 French musical film directed by Pierre Caron and starring Joan Warner, Christiane Delyne, Maurice Escande and Suzanne Dehelly. The film's sets were designed by the art director Jean Douarinou.

== Cast ==
- Joan Warner as Evelyne
- Maurice Escande as Gilbert
- Christiane Delyne as Dany Rosy
- Suzanne Dehelly as Virginie
- Jeanne Fusier-Gir as Mme Mataplan
- Félix Paquet as L'électricien Titin
- Philippe Janvier as Un étudiant
- Paul Marcel as Jérôme
- Paul Faivre as Monsieur Mataplan
- Marcel Vallée as Le directeur
- Les Bluebell Girls as Themselves

== Bibliography ==
- Bessy, Maurice & Chirat, Raymond. Histoire du cinéma français: 1935-1939. Pygmalion, 1986.
- Crisp, Colin. Genre, Myth and Convention in the French Cinema, 1929-1939. Indiana University Press, 2002.
- Rège, Philippe. Encyclopedia of French Film Directors, Volume 1. Scarecrow Press, 2009.
