= Bux the Clown =

1935 film

- Directed by: Jacques Natanson
- Written by: Suzanne Chantal
- Based on: Bux by Hans Mahner-Mons
- Starring: Henri Rollan; Pierre Larquey; Suzy Vernon
- Cinematography: Theodore J. Pahle
- Edited by: Claude Ibéria
- Music by: Roger Désormière; Jean Wiener
- Production company: Acta-Films
- Distributed by: Pathé Journal
- Release date: 17 March 1935
- Running time: 90 minutes
- Country: France
- Language: French

Bux the Clown (French: Le clown Bux) is a 1935 French drama film directed by Jacques Natanson and starring Henri Rollan, Pierre Larquey and Suzy Vernon. It was based on the novel Bux by Hans Mahner-Mons, later adapted for the 1937 British film Make-Up. The film's sets were designed by the art director Jean d'Eaubonne.

== Cast ==
- Henri Rollan as Pierre Buxeuil alias le clown Bux
- Pierre Larquey as Le clown Boum
- Suzy Vernon as Nicole de Prastelny
- Lilian Greuze as Monique Daumier
- Jean Debucourt as Brissac
- Gaston Modot as Benson
- Hélène Robert as Nelly
- Sylvia Nancey as La maîtresse de Vegas
- Camille Bert as Monsieur de Prastelny
- Max Maxudian as Djambie
- Joan Warner as La danseuse nue
- Joë Hamman as Rancho - un cow boy
- Joe Alex as Tom
- Jérôme Goulven as Vegas
- Jean Fay as Lorenzo
- Jacques Mattler as Le juge français
- Louis Gauthier as Le juge américain
- Tony Murcie as Valentin

== Bibliography ==
- Bessy, Maurice & Chirat, Raymond. Histoire du cinéma français: 1935-1939. Pygmalion, 1986.
- Crisp, Colin. Genre, Myth and Convention in the French Cinema, 1929-1939. Indiana University Press, 2002.
- Rège, Philippe. Encyclopedia of French Film Directors, Volume 1. Scarecrow Press, 2009.
