= Operation Leopard =

La légion saute sur Kolwezi
- Original film poster
- Directed by: Raoul Coutard
- Written by: André-Georges Brunelin
- Based on: La légion saute sur Kolwezi by Pierre Sergent
- Produced by: Gérard Beytout; Georges de Beauregard
- Starring: Bruno Cremer; Mimsy Farmer; Giuliano Gemma
- Cinematography: Georges Liron
- Edited by: Michel Lewin
- Music by: Serge Franklin
- Distributed by: BELA – FR3; Société Nouvelle de Cinématographie (SNC)
- Release date: 1 September 1980
- Running time: 96 minutes
- Country: France
- Language: French

La légion saute sur Kolwezi, also known as Operation Leopard, is a French war film directed by Raoul Coutard and filmed in French Guiana. The script is based on the true story of the Battle of Kolwezi that happened in 1978. It was diligently described in a book of the same name by former 1st Foreign Parachute Regiment Captain Pierre Sergent. He published his book in 1979, and the film came out in 1980. Coutard shot the film in a documentary style.

== Plot ==
The film is based on true events. In 1978, approximately 3,000 heavily armed fighters from Katanga crossed the border to the Zaire and marched into Kolwezi, a mining centre for copper and cobalt. They took 3,000 civilians as hostages. Within a few days, between 90 and 280 hostages were killed. The rebels appeared to be unpredictable and are reported to have threatened to annihilate all civilians.

Mobutu Sese Seko, Zaire's head of state, urged Belgium, France and the United States to help. France sent the Foreign Legion's 2nd Foreign Parachute Regiment, which were flown from Corsica to Kolwezi. Following their arrival, they secured the perimeter, in co-operation with Belgian soldiers from Zaire, and then started to evacuate the civilians. Within two days more than 2,000 Europeans and about 3,000 African citizens were saved. The film strives to depict the events in a dramatised form, concentrating on the Europeans' plight.

== Production ==
The late Jean Seberg had filmed scenes on location for the film, but her death caused her to be replaced by another French American actress, Mimsy Farmer, who reshot Seberg's scenes.

== Cast ==
- Bruno Cremer: Pierre Delbart
- Jacques Perrin:Ambassador Berthier
- Laurent Malet: Phillipe Denrémont
- Pierre Vaneck: Colonel Grasser
- Mimsy Farmer: Annie Devrindt
- Giuliano Gemma: Adjudant Fédérico
- Robert Etcheverry : Colonel Dubourg
- Jean-Claude Bouillon : Maurois

== Sources ==
This article incorporates information from the French Wikipedia.
