= Marlene Marlowe Investigates =

British children's TV programme

- Genre: Children's
- Created by: Roy Apps
- Starring: Kate Copstick; Jo Kendall
- Country of origin: United Kingdom
- Original language: English
- No. of series: 2
- No. of episodes: 30

Production
- Running time: 20 minutes

Original release
- Network: BBC1
- Release: 25 September 1993 – 31 December 1994

Marlene Marlowe Investigates is a short-lived BBC children's programme based on the book by Roy Apps about an incompetent detective and her many adventures.

== Episodes ==
=== Series One ===
Title	Episodes	Original release date
"The Jininsky Tapes Affair"	6	25 September 1993
"The Puddlethorpe Carnival Caper"	4	TBA
"The Great Christmas Pudding Mystery"	5	1 January 1994

=== Series Two ===
Title	Episodes	Original release date
"The Hitmey Hootson Kidnapping"	3	24 September 1994
"The Phantom Floppy Fiddler"	3	TBA
"The Hound of Puddlethorpe Hall"	3	TBA
"The Claud Ward Fraud Hoard"	3	TBA
"The Puddlethorpe Pantomime Palaver"	3	31 December 1994
