= Mirror (1947 film) =

1947 film

- Directed by: Raymond Lamy
- Written by: Paul Ollivier; Carlo Rim
- Produced by: Paul-Edmond Decharme
- Starring: Jean Gabin; Daniel Gélin; Antonin Berval; Martine Carol
- Cinematography: Roger Hubert
- Edited by: Germaine Artus
- Music by: Maurice Yvain
- Production companies: Alcina; Sud-Pacifique Films
- Distributed by: Gaumont-Eagle Lion
- Release date: 2 May 1947
- Running time: 90 minutes
- Country: France
- Language: French

Mirror (French: Miroir) is a 1947 French crime drama film directed by Raymond Lamy and starring Jean Gabin, Daniel Gélin and Martine Carol. It was shot at the Saint-Maurice Studios in Paris. The film's sets were designed by the art director Georges Wakhévitch. It was Gabin's second film following his return to his homeland after serving in the Free French forces after the poorly-received Martin Roumagnac (1946) alongside Marlene Dietrich. The film marks a shift from the doomed men of the pre-war poetic realism that established Gabin as a star to the powerful figures he played from the 1950s onwards.

== Plot ==
A prominent, respected businessman Pierre Lussac leads a double life as a top Paris-based gangster operating out of a flourishing nightclub and casino with a large number of public officials in his pocket. A smooth operator he acts as a fixer for his various associates.

In his home life his adopted son is taking his first steps as a lawyer and becomes engaged to a woman from a prominent family. His upper-class wife, his younger children and his mother-in-law add to his air of respectability despite his ordinary roots.

Things take a turn for the worse when a southern gang based in Marseille led by Folco declares war on his own organisation. Blood is shed in a series of fights. The bad publicity from this spills over to his private and business life, intruding into his son's wedding and leading his wife and mother-in-law to turn on him. His former friends in government turn their backs on him. Only his mistress, a singer in his nightclub remains loyal to him, and begs him to go away with her. However he decides to stay and fight his ground.

Before his final confrontation with his enemies, Lussac meets with a former associate who had escaped from prison after serving a sentence for taking part in a raid in 1935. He refused to inform on his colleagues but is outraged that his son, who Lussac had adopted as his own without his authority, is now a lawyer. He taunts Lussac for having betrayed his roots. Lussac shoots him dead. In a final gunfight in the graveyard at his funeral Lussac overcomes his southern gangster rivals before being shot down himself by the police.

== Cast ==
- Jean Gabin as Le financier Pierre Lussac / Le gangster Miroir
- Antonin Berval as Folco
- Daniel Gélin as Charles Lussac
- Gisèle Préville as Anna Lussac
- Martine Carol as Lulu
- Colette Mars as Cléo
- Gabrielle Dorziat as Madame Puc
- Henri Crémieux as Saint-Eloi
- Robert Arnoux as Leroy-Garnier
- René Blancard as Boisrond
- Jacques Sernas as Battling-Joe
- Charles Lemontier as L'inspecteur Ballestra
- Henri Poupon as L'oncle
- Félicien Tramel as Le baron
- André Carnège as Montfort - le médecin légiste
- Colette Richard as Juliette Montfort
- Pierre Magnier as Le président du tribunal
- Marcel Dieudonné as Le second de Lussac
- Odette Barencey as L'habilleuse
- Paul Faivre as L'abbé Viegeard
- René Hell as Le gangster
- Robert Le Ray as Le barman
- Robert Moor as Antoine
- Colette Régis as La marquise
- Fernand Flament as Un membre de la bande à Folco
- Manuel Gary as Un membre de la bande à Folco
- Josselin as Un membre de la bande à Folco
- Julien Maffre as Un membre de la bande à Folco
- André Talmès as Un membre de la bande à Folco
- Sylvie as La religieuse

== Production ==
Miroir was produced by Alcina and Sud-Pacifique Films.

The assistant director for the film was Raymond Bailly, the dialogue writer was Carlo Rim, the screenwriters were Paul Ollivier and Carlo Rim, the director of photography was Roger Hubert, the sound engineers were Jean Putel and Jacques Carrère, the cinematographer was Marc Fossard, the production director was Marcel Bryau, the editor was Germaine Artus, the script supervisor was Jacqueline Loir, the production designers were Roland Berthon and Georges Wakhevitch, the composer was Maurice Yvain, the make-up artist was Boris de Fast, and the general manager was Claude Pinoteau.

The film is in black and white and was shot with 35 mm movie film. The aspect ratio of the film was 1.37:1, the Academy ratio. The audio of the film was monaural. The duration of the film is 90 minutes.

The film was the second French film that Jean Gabin acted in after spending World War II in the United States.

The film was the first film that Jacques Sernas acted in. He played a boxer.

== Release ==
Miroir was distributed in France by Les Films de la Pléiade and Compagnie Parisienne de Location de Films. The film was distributed internationally by Les Films du Jeudi.

The film was released in France on May 2, 1947.

== Reception ==
In France, Miroir had box office admissions of 1,776,310.

In the book Jean Gabin: The Actor Who Was France, Joseph Harriss described Miroir as a "mediocre gangster movie" and quoted Gabin as saying "I prefer to forget that one."

In the book Paris In The Dark: Going To The Movies In The City Of Light, 1930–1950, Eric Smoodin wrote that Miroir was "among the least favored" films to play at the Gaumont-Palace theater.

The film was favorably reviewed by Antoine Sire for Paris Fait Son Cinéma.

== Bibliography ==
- Harriss, Joseph. Jean Gabin: The Actor Who Was France. McFarland, 2018.
- Turk, Edward Baron. Child of Paradise: Marcel Carné and the Golden Age of French Cinema. Harvard University Press, 1989.
