= Noë Bloch =

- Born: 1875; St. Petersburg, Russian Empire
- Died: 31 July 1937 (aged 61–62); Paris, France
- Other name: Noé Markowitsch Bloch
- Occupation: Producer

Noë Bloch (1875-1937) was a Russian-born film producer. He was born as Noé Markowitsch Bloch to a Jewish family in St. Petersburg in the Russian Empire. After emigrating from Russia following the Russian Revolution, Bloch established himself as a producer in Germany and in France where he often worked with other Russian exiles at Albatros Film.

== Selected filmography ==
- The Loves of Casanova (1927)
- Muche (1927)
- Hurrah! I Live! (1928)
- Dolly Gets Ahead (1930)
- The Unknown Singer (1931)
- No More Love (1931)
- Calais-Dover (1931)
- In the Employ of the Secret Service (1931)
- The Squadron's Baby (1935)

== Bibliography ==
- Crisp, C.G. The Classic French Cinema, 1930-1960. Indiana University Press, 1993.
