= Les Truands =

- Directed by: Carlo Rim
- Written by: Carlo Rim
- Produced by: Robert Sussfeld
- Starring: Eddie Constantine; Noël-Noël; Jean Richard
- Cinematography: Maurice Barry
- Edited by: Monique Kirsanoff
- Music by: Georges Van Parys
- Production company: Franco London Films
- Distributed by: Gaumont Distribution
- Release date: 27 April 1956
- Running time: 99 minutes
- Country: France
- Language: French

Les Truands is a 1956 French comedy film starring Eddie Constantine directed by Carlo Rim. For English-speaking audiences it was renamed as Lock Up Your Spoons respectively The Gangsters.

== Synopsis ==
This is the story of racketeer Amédée who recalls the story of his life when he is already more than 100 years old. He tells his family about his rise and his rivals. This is all to explain why he couldn't help but nick the watch of the mayor, who came to congratulate him.

== Cast ==
- Eddie Constantine as Jim Esposito, racketeer in Marseille
- Noël-Noël as Cahuzac, racketeer in Bordeaux
- Jean Richard as Alexandre Benoit, Amédée's son
- Yves Robert as Amédée Benoit (and his father)
- Sylvie as Clarisse Benoit
- Lucien Baroux as the priest
- Mireille Granelli as Clarisse at the age of 18 years
- Denise Provence as La Païva
- Line Noro as Chiffon
- Junie Astor as Mlle Puc, the tailoress
- Héléna Manson as Nana
- Robert Dalban as Pépito Benoit
- Gaston Modot as Justin Benoit
- Cora Vaucaire as a singer
- Claude Borelli as a wife of Jim
- Antonin Berval as Benoit's third-born son
- Martine Alexis as a wife of Jim
- Irène Tunc as a wife of Jim
- Ariane Lancell as a saloon girl
- Béatrice Arnac as Mme Léonce
- Guy Tréjean as Bobby, the lover of Cahuzac's daughter
- Albert Rémy as policeman
- Nadine Tallier as a wife of Jim
- Claude Godard as a wife of Jim
- Françoise Delbart as the twin's mother
- André Bervil as Ange
- Daniel Sorano as the barkeeper
- Robert Vattier as the Duke of Morny
- André Dalibert as a police officer
- Michel Nastorg as town mayor
- Léon Larive as photographer
- Pascal Alexandre as Jim as child
- Christian Denhez as Amédée as child
- Jean d'Yd as the grandfather
- Nelly Vignon as Madeleine Cahuzac
- Jacques Mancier as police inspector
- Henri Cogan as a cowboy
