= Justin de Marseille =

1935 film directed by Maurice Tourneur

- Directed by: Maurice Tourneur
- Written by: Carlo Rim
- Produced by: Bernard Natan; Emile Natan
- Starring: Antonin Berval; Pierre Larquey; Alexandre Rignault
- Cinematography: Georges Benoît
- Music by: Jacques Ibert
- Production company: Pathé-Natan
- Distributed by: Pathé-Natan
- Release date: 5 April 1935
- Running time: 95 minutes
- Country: France
- Language: French

Justin de Marseille is a 1935 French crime drama film directed by Maurice Tourneur and starring Antonin Berval, Pierre Larquey and Alexandre Rignault. It was shot at the Joinville Studios of Pathé-Natan in Paris and on location around Marseille. The film's sets were designed by the art director Lazare Meerson.

== Synopsis ==
A journalist from Paris investigates why the port city of Marseille has developed a reputation as France's Chicago due to its gangsters. Two crime gangs engaged in a fierce rivalry led by Justin, a local man, and the ruthless Esposito from Naples who has moved into smuggling opium.

== Cast ==
- Antonin Berval as Justin
- Pierre Larquey as Le Bègue
- Alexandre Rignault as Esposito
- Ghislaine Bru as Totone
- Line Noro as La Rougeole
- Paul Ollivier as Achille
- Raymond Aimos as Le Fada
- Armand Larcher as Silvio
- Paul Amiot as Le sous-directeur de la Sûreté
- Duluard as Pantalon
- Marcel Raine as Brutus
- Paul Grail as Félicien
- Milly Mathis as Mme Trompette
- Marthe Mellot as La mère de Justin
- Renée Dennsy as Ninette
- Marguerite Chabert as Mme Olympe
- Tino Rossi as Le chanteur
- Anthony Gildès as Le curé
- Gaby Basset as Mado
- José Davert as L'Ancien
- Viviane Romance as Une pensionnaire de Madame Olympe

== Bibliography ==
- Hewitt, Nicholas. Wicked City: The Many Cultures of Marseille. Oxford University Press, 2019.
- Rège, Philippe. Encyclopedia of French Film Directors, Volume 1. Scarecrow Press, 2009.
- Waldman, Harry. Maurice Tourneur: The Life and Films. McFarland, 2001.
