= Make-Up (1937 film) =

- Directed by: Alfred Zeisler
- Written by: Jeffrey Dell; Reginald Long; Ludwig von Wohl
- Based on: Bux by Hans Mahner-Mons
- Produced by: K.C. Alexander; C.M. Origo
- Starring: Nils Asther; June Clyde; Judy Kelly; Lawrence Grossmith
- Cinematography: Eric Cross; Philip Tannura
- Edited by: George Grace
- Production company: Standard International
- Distributed by: Associated British Film Distributors
- Release date: 28 June 1937
- Running time: 70 minutes
- Country: United Kingdom
- Language: English

Make-Up is a 1937 British drama film directed by Alfred Zeisler and starring Nils Asther, June Clyde and Judy Kelly. It was a circus film made by an independent production company at Shepperton Studios. The story is based on a novel by Hans Mahner-Mons, which had previously been adapted into the 1935 film Bux the Clown.

== Plot ==
Born in a circus, Bux (Nils Asther) hankers after life there, but is pressurised by his family to study to become a surgeon. However, the lure of the Big Top proves too strong, and he abandons his medical career for a life as a circus clown. His clinical expertise comes in handy when attending the injuries of a young woman knocked down by an elephant, and romance beckons.

== Cast ==
- Nils Asther as Bux
- June Clyde as Joy
- Judy Kelly as Marien Hutton
- Lawrence Grossmith as Sir Edward Hutton
- Jill Craigie as Tania
- Kenne Duncan as Lorenzo
- Lawrence Anderson as Goro
- Roddy Hughes as Mr. Greenswarter
- Johnnie Schofield as Publicity Man
- John Turnbull as Karo
- Norma Varden as Hostess
- Billy Wells as Ringmaster

== Bibliography ==
- Low, Rachael. Filmmaking in 1930s Britain. George Allen & Unwin, 1985.
- Wood, Linda. British Films, 1927-1939. British Film Institute, 1986.
