= Temptation (1936 film) =

1936 film

- Directed by: Pierre Caron
- Written by: Michel Carré
- Based on: Temptation by Charles Méré
- Produced by: Claude Dolbert
- Starring: Marie Bell; Antonin Berval; Gina Manès
- Cinematography: Georges Benoît; Jean Isnard
- Edited by: Christian Chamborant
- Music by: Jane Bos
- Production company: Les Productions Claude Dolbert
- Release date: 21 December 1936
- Running time: 97 minutes
- Country: France
- Language: French

Temptation (French: La Tentation) is a 1936 French drama film directed by Pierre Caron and starring Marie Bell, Antonin Berval and Gina Manès. It was based on a 1924 stage play of the same title by Charles Méré. The film's sets were designed by the art director Jean Douarinou.

== Synopsis ==
The marriaged Irène de Bergue is courted by two men but remains loyal to her husband, despite his affairs. When her husband is killed in suspicious circumstances it appears that one of her potential lovers has had a hand in it.

== Cast ==
- Marie Bell as Irène de Bergue
- Antonin Berval as Robert
- Henri Rollan as Maurice Brinon
- Gina Manès as Claire
- Raymond Cordy as Lutard
- Arlette Dubreuil as Madame de Beauchamp
- Hélène Pépée as Loulou Garneret
- Georges Péclet as M. de Beauchamp
- Serjius as Philippe de Bergue

== Bibliography ==
- Bessy, Maurice & Chirat, Raymond. Histoire du cinéma français: 1935-1939. Pygmalion, 1986.
- Crisp, Colin. Genre, Myth and Convention in the French Cinema, 1929-1939. Indiana University Press, 2002.
- Rège, Philippe. Encyclopedia of French Film Directors, Volume 1. Scarecrow Press, 2009.
