= Romarin (film) =

1937 film

- Directed by: André Hugon
- Written by: Paul Achard; André Hugon
- Produced by: André Hugon
- Starring: Jean Aquistapace; Yvette Lebon; Antonin Berval
- Cinematography: Marc Bujard; Tahar Hanache
- Edited by: Louise Mazier
- Music by: Vincent Scotto
- Production company: Films André Hugon
- Distributed by: Cinéma de France
- Release date: 1 January 1937
- Running time: 108 minutes
- Country: France
- Language: French

Romarin is a 1937 French comedy film directed by André Hugon and starring Jean Aquistapace, Yvette Lebon and Antonin Berval. It was shot at the Victorine Studios in Nice.

== Cast ==
- Jean Aquistapace as Romarin
- Yvette Lebon as Nine
- Antonin Berval as Tonin
- Jeanne Boitel as Olga
- Robert Le Vigan as Le brigadier Napoléon Orsini
- Pierre Larquey as Larquus
- Édouard Delmont as Le maire
- Gilson as Le secrétaire de la mairie
- Pailhan as Le vieux marin
- Fernand Flament as Parodi
- Charley Cadet as Le gosse
- Serge Gleboff as Le gangster
- Mme Toine as Mme Nancey

== Bibliography ==
- Bessy, Maurice & Chirat, Raymond. Histoire du cinéma français: 1935-1939. Pygmalion, 1986.
- Crisp, Colin. Genre, Myth and Convention in the French Cinema, 1929-1939. Indiana University Press, 2002.
- Rège, Philippe. Encyclopedia of French Film Directors, Volume 1. Scarecrow Press, 2009.
