= Nicole Vattier =

French actress

- Born: 19 May 1910; Lorient, Morbihan, France
- Died: 12 January 2007 (aged 96); Beaumont-sur-Oise, Val-d'Oise, France
- Occupation: Actress
- Years active: 1932–1958 (film)

Nicole Vattier (May 19, 1910 - January 12, 2007) was a French film actress, active mainly in the 1930s. She appeared as the female lead in the 1932 film Maurin of the Moors and its 1933 sequel The Illustrious Maurin, both directed by André Hugon. She was the sister of the actor Robert Vattier and aunt of Bérangère Vattier.

== Selected filmography ==
- Maurin of the Moors (1932)
- The Illustrious Maurin (1933)
- Bourrasque (1935)
- Gaspard de Besse (1935)
- The Heart Disposes (1936)
- If You Return (1938)
- Mirages (1938)
- Tabarin (1958)

== Bibliography ==
- Goble, Alan. The Complete Index to Literary Sources in Film. Walter de Gruyter, 1999.
