= Elmire Vautier =

French actress (1897–1954)

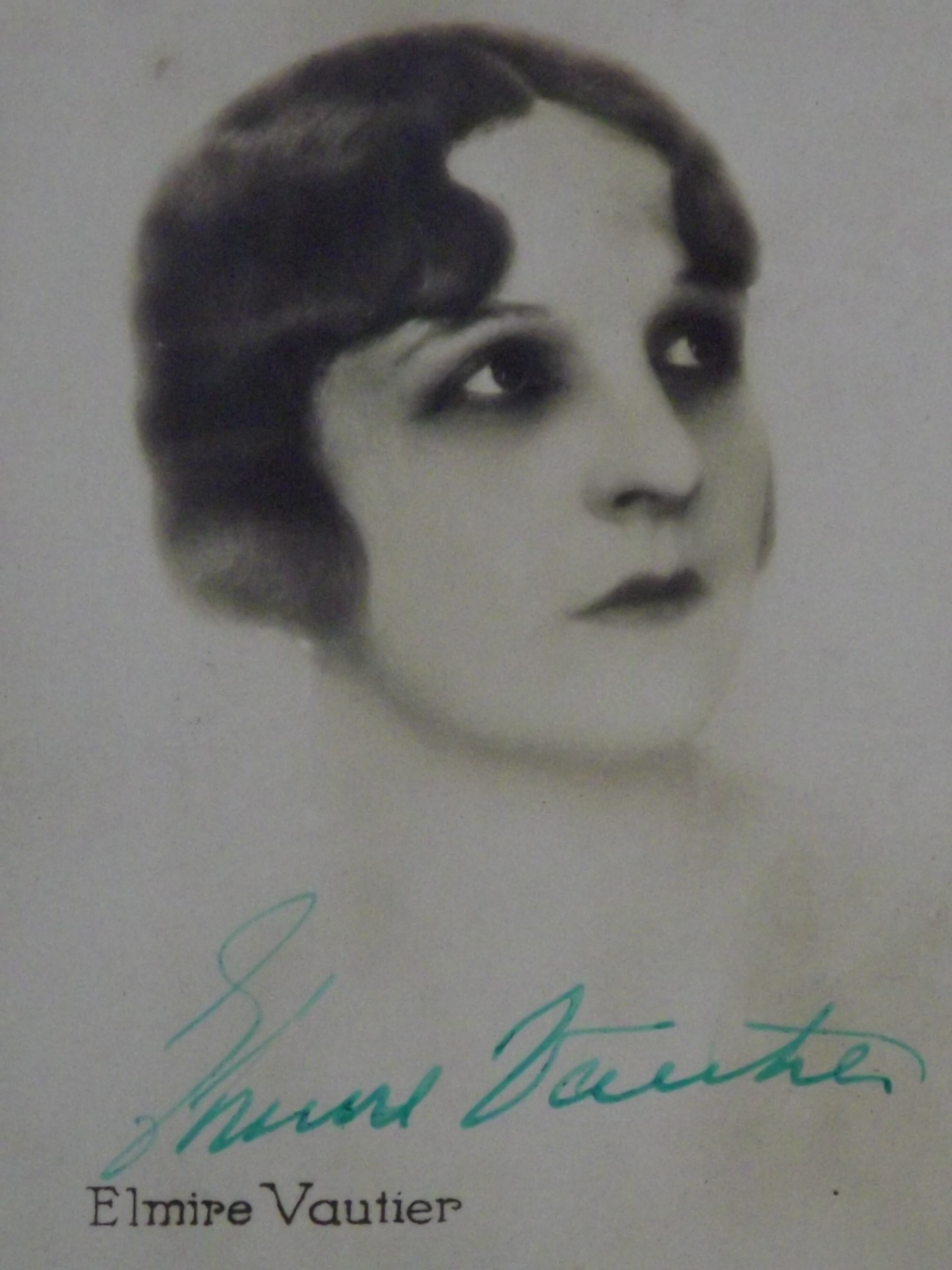
- Born: 28 August 1897; Grandchain, Eure, France
- Died: 29 April 1954 (aged 56); Livilliers, Val-d'Oise, France
- Occupation: Actress
- Years active: 1919–1942 (film)

Elmire Vautier (August 28, 1897 – April 29, 1954) was a French film actress of the silent and early sound era. Vautier starred in several serials alongside René Navarre to whom she was married. She also appeared frequently on stage.

== Selected filmography ==
- King of the Camargue (1922)
- Judith (1922)
- Ferragus (1923)
- Vidocq (1923)
- Jean Chouan (1926)
- Belphégor (1927)
- Muche (1927)
- The Vein (1928)
- Temptation (1929)
- Baccarat (1929)
- The Indictment (1931)
- Wedding Night (1935)
- Confessions of a Cheat (1936)
- Mercadet (1936)
- Miarka (1937)
- If You Return (1938)
- The Patriot (1938)
- Behind the Facade (1939)
- Miss Bonaparte (1942)

== Bibliography ==
- Goble, Alan. The Complete Index to Literary Sources in Film. Walter de Gruyter, 1999.
- Rainey, Buck. Serials and Series: A World Filmography, 1912-1956. McFarland, 2015.
- Wlaschin, Ken. Silent Mystery and Detective Movies: A Comprehensive Filmography. McFarland, 2009.
