= Reda Caire =

French opera singer

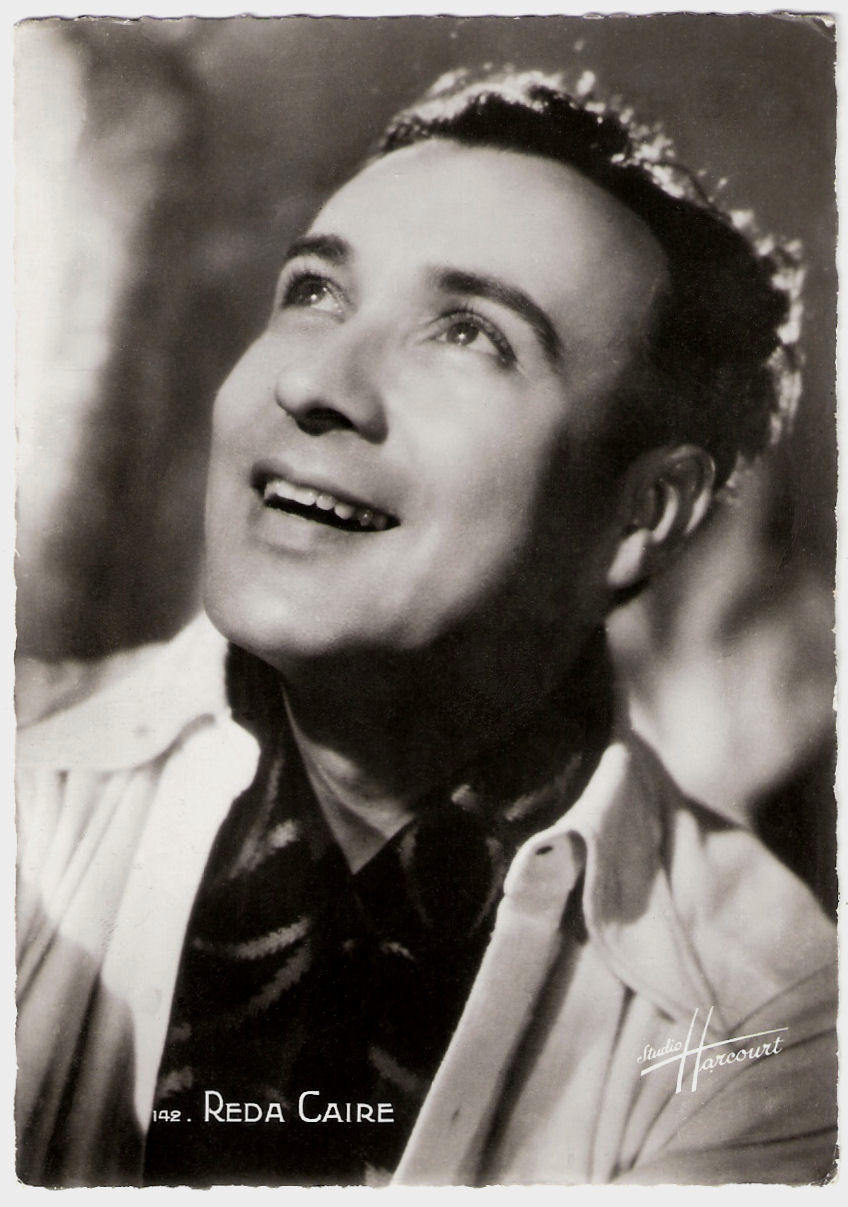
Reda Caire in 1942

Reda Caire (real name: Joseph Gandhour) (1908–1963) was a popular singer of operettes in Paris in the 1930s and 1950s.

Gandhour was born in Cairo, Egypt in 1908. He took his stage name from his hometown. He starred in the movie, L'enfant de minuit.

During the Second World War, he was accused of being Jewish. He was gay, though closeted.

He was buried in Saint-Zacharie, France in 1963.
