= The Indictment (film) =

1931 film directed by Dimitri Buchowetzki

- Directed by: Dimitri Buchowetzki
- Written by: Henry Koster; Alice Duer Miller (novel); Pierre Scize; Benno Vigny
- Starring: Marcelle Chantal; Fernand Fabre; Elmire Vautier
- Cinematography: Harry Stradling Sr.
- Production company: Les Studios Paramount
- Distributed by: Les Studios Paramount
- Release date: February 20, 1931
- Running time: 84 minutes
- Country: United States
- Language: French

The Indictment (French: Le réquisitoire) is a 1931 drama film directed by Dimitri Buchowetzki and starring Marcelle Chantal, Fernand Fabre and Elmire Vautier. It was made by Paramount Pictures at the Joinville Studios in Paris as the French-language version of Manslaughter. Paramount was a leader in producing Multi-language versions during the early 1930s, and German, Spanish and Swedish versions were also made of the film.

== Cast ==
- Marcelle Chantal as Lydia Alton
- Fernand Fabre as Georges Sainclair
- Elmire Vautier as Eliane Belling
- Gaston Jacquet as J.B. Albey
- Héléna Manson as Annette Evans
- Rachel Launay as Mlle. Bennett
- Pierre Piérade as Carter
- Pierre Labry as Peters
- Raymond Leboursier as Bobby
- Max Arditi as Alex
- André Brévannes as Alfred
- Maurice Maillot
- Renée Fleury

== Bibliography ==
- Beckman, Karen. Crash: Cinema and the Politics of Speed and Stasis. Duke University Press, 2010.
