= Kate Copstick =

Scottish actress, writer and director

- Born: Glasgow, Scotland
- Education: University of Glasgow
- Occupations: Actress; television presenter; television writer; critic; television director; television producer
- Years active: 1982–present

Kate Copstick is a Scottish actress, television presenter, television writer, critic, television director and television producer.

== Early life ==
Copstick was born in Glasgow, Scotland, and studied for a law degree at the University of Glasgow.

== Career ==
As a comedy actor, Copstick appeared on children's TV shows No. 73 in the 1980s, and ChuckleVision in the 1990s. She played the titular role in children's series Marlene Marlowe Investigates, and performed as part of the ensemble cast of former Saturday morning BBC children's show On the Waterfront. Copstick executive produced the Natural Born Racers TV series that followed the Virgin Mobile Yamaha R6 Cup.

Copstick is a commentator on human sexuality. After years writing for the Erotic Review, she became its owner in 2009.

At the Edinburgh Festival Fringe, Copstick was a Perrier Comedy Award judge in 2003 and 2004, and a Malcolm Hardee Award judge in 2008–2015. She lends her voice to the announcements at Fort William railway station.

She is The Scotsman newspaper's comedy critic, having begun reviewing for the paper in 1999.

=== Work with charitable organisations ===
Copstick has worked in Kenya with HIV+ women and their families. Through the Children With AIDS Charity, of which she is vice-chair, she started Mama Biashara ("Business Mother") in 2008, working to set these women up in small businesses, thus making them financially independent. The slogan of the charity is "A Hand Up, Not a Hand Out", and its survival is dependent on donations and on raising money from the Mama Biashara shop in Shepherd's Bush Green, London.

Copstick made Positive Thinking for BBC One, a documentary on HIV/AIDS aimed at children. She is a patron of the Waverley Care Trust.

== Personal life ==
Copstick was attacked and robbed close to her home in west London in September 2022. The robbers took £8,500 that she had raised for her charity Mama Biashara.

== Theatre ==
| Year | Title | Role | Company | Director | Notes |
|---|---|---|---|---|---|
| 1982 | The Shepherd Beguiled | Jean | Theatre Alba | Charles Nowosielski | play by Netta B. Reid |

== Filmography ==
Actress

- The Basil Brush Show (1 episode, 2003)
- ChuckleVision (10 episodes, 1992–2000)
- Marlene Marlowe Investigates (1993) TV series
- A Bit of Fry and Laurie (1 episode, 1992)
- On the Waterfront (12 episodes, 1988)
- No. 73 (20 episodes, 1986–1987)

Writer

- Hotel Getaway (8 episodes, 2000–2003)
- On the Waterfront (24 episodes, 1988–1989)
- Lose a Million

Self

- Show Me the Funny (2011) – Judge (TV)
- Dawn Goes Lesbian (2008) – Instructor
- The If.comedy Awards: A Comedy Cuts Special (2007) (TV)
- RIP 2002 (2002) (TV)
- Hotel Getaway (1 episode, 2000)
- No Kidding (1991) – Presenter
- Crosswits – Regular Panellist
- On the Waterfront (12 episodes, 1989)
- So You Want to be Top? (1983) (TV) – Co-host

== Bibliography ==
- Masterclass: Girl on Girl: Erotic Print Society, January 2008. ISBN 1-904989-40-3 - ISBN 978-1-904989-40-0
- Porn Week: Erotic Print Society, May 2007. ISBN 1-904989-31-4 - ISBN 978-1-904989-31-8
- The Illustrated Book of Sapphic Sex: Erotic Print Society, May 2000. ISBN 1-898998-25-6 - ISBN 978-1-898998-25-9
