= Liolà =

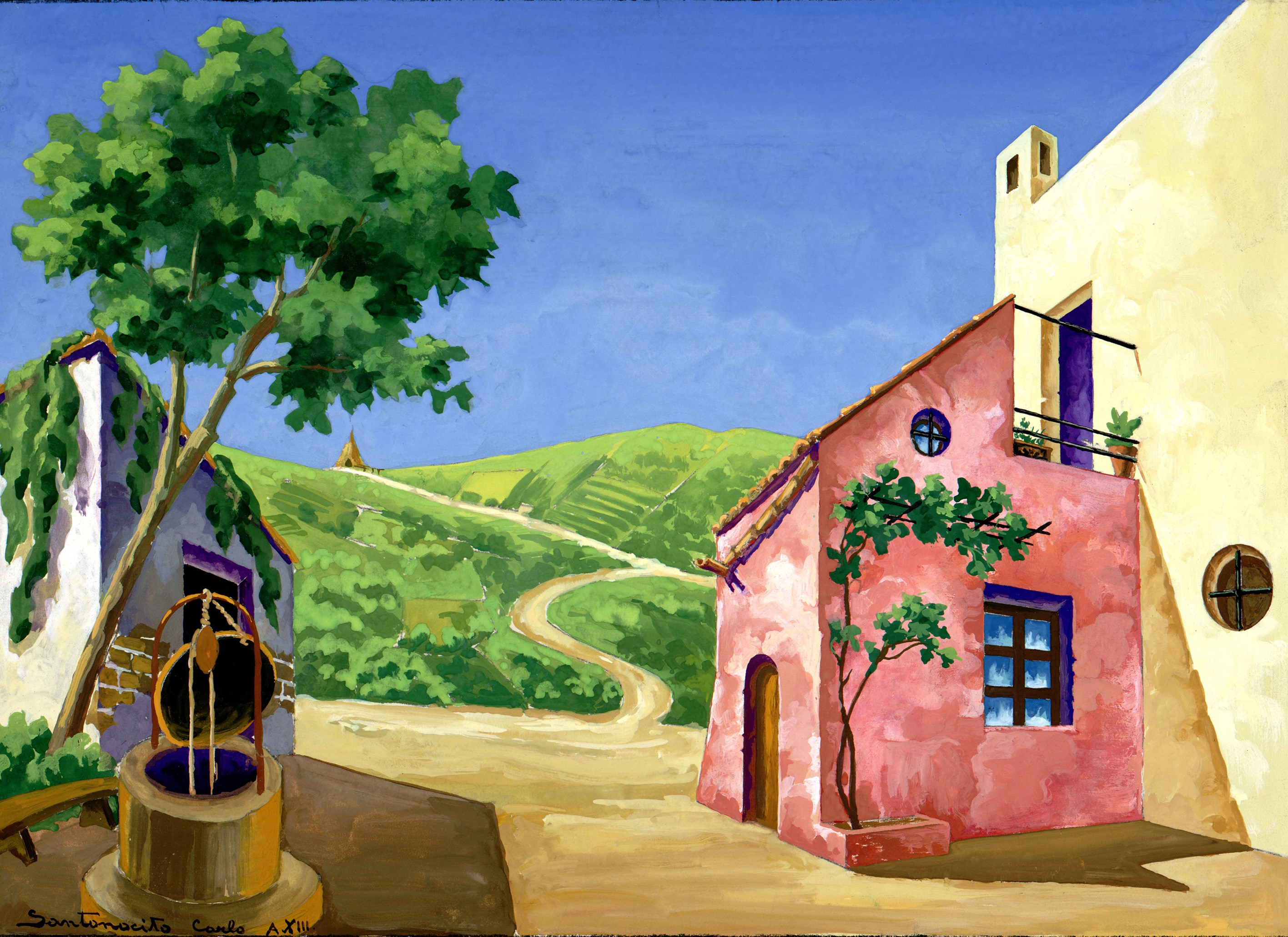
- Il vigneto di Zia Croce, set design for Liolà act 3 (1935)
- Original language: Sicilian
- Written by: Luigi Pirandello
- Genre: comedy

Premiere
- Date: 4 November 1916
- Place: Teatro Argentina, Rome

Liolà (Italian pronunciation: [ljoˈla]) is an Italian stage play written by Luigi Pirandello in 1916, which takes place in early 20th century Sicily. The original text was composed in the Sicilian dialect of Agrigento. The title character is a middle-aged single father by choice. He has three young boys, each by a different mother. Liolà is a free-spirit who wanders from town to town, looking to connect with nature, and to create children without having any ties to the mother. He tries to sell one of his boys to Zio Simone, a crabby elderly man, who becomes offended by the offer. He then has an encounter with Mita, a former lover, who tells him that he is the father of her unborn child. Pirandello immortalizes Liolà as an ideal father, and in certain scenes in the play, Liolà shows a lot of love and affection to his children.

"Liola disclosed an unfamiliar side of Pirandello. It is the work of his Sicilian origins and in place of the fractured perspective of illusion and reality its view of the world is as down-to-earth as a primitive painting with landscape and figures equally expressive of the one theme of fecundity."

— Irving Wardle

== Film adaptations ==
- Liolà directed by Alessandro Blasetti; written by Sergio Amidei, Elio Bartolini, Alessandro Blasetti, 1964
- Liolà di Gabriele Lavia, 2005

== Theatrical adaptations ==
- The Bloomsbury Theatre premiered the English language performance of Pirandello`s Liola by Internationalist Theatre (then registered as New Internationalist Theatre) in London on the 28th July 1982 directed and translated by Fabio Perselli, who also collaborated with Victoria Glyn to compose the original music. The multifarious accents of the actors cast from multi-cultural backgrounds was an issue for The Financial Times. For others "The pleasures of the performance with its occasional songs based on ballads and tarantellas, lay in the village vitality, the lusty folk element, and the children romped about deliciously. A very good evening of an unusual kind." "The main thing an English audience has to grasp is that Pirandello is writing about a society where there are no unwanted children.....they are a source of joy". Corriere della Sera observed: "Il successo e stato particolarmente vivo e le recensioni della stampa molto positivo".
- In August 2013 The National Theatre staged Liola adapted by Tanya Ronder. "This touching and entertaining production glows with the warmth of summer...The director, Richard Eyre, has cast the play with Irish actors, to evoke the rural nature of the piece", said Charles Spencer of The Telegraph. "Particular mention must go to the central sparring partners Mita and Tuzza (Lisa Dwyer Hogg and Jessica Regan) and Aisling O'Sullivan as the latter's long suffering mother. In this world, you're either a wife or a mother – or nothing, as one character puts it. "That's all there is." Only for Liola (an assured turn by Rory Keenan) the freedom to be "pure nature"".
