= Pierre Caron (director) =

French film director (1901–1972)

Pierre Caron (15 August 1901 – 22 February 1971) was a French film director. At the end of the Second World War he was forced to flee to South America, where he later died.

== Filmography ==
- 1920 : L'Homme qui vendit son âme au diable
- 1923 : La Mare au diable
- 1932 : Beauty Spot
- 1934 : Your Smile
- 1935 : Juanita
- 1936 : Temptation
- 1936 : Notre-Dame d'amour
- 1936 : Les Demi vierges
- 1936 : Marinella
- 1937 : La Fessée
- 1937 : Blanchette
- 1937 : Cinderella
- 1938 : Le Monsieur de 5 heures
- 1938 : Mon oncle et mon curé
- 1938 : Les Femmes collantes
- 1938 : Riviera Express or L'Accroche-cœur)
- 1938 : La Route enchantée
- 1939 : Sing Anyway
- 1940 : Bécassine
- 1941 : Ne bougez plus
- 1942 : Pension Jonas
- 1945 : Ils étaient cinq permissionnaires
- 1956 : Eva no Brasil
