= Jean Aicard =

French poet, dramatist and novelist (1848–1921)

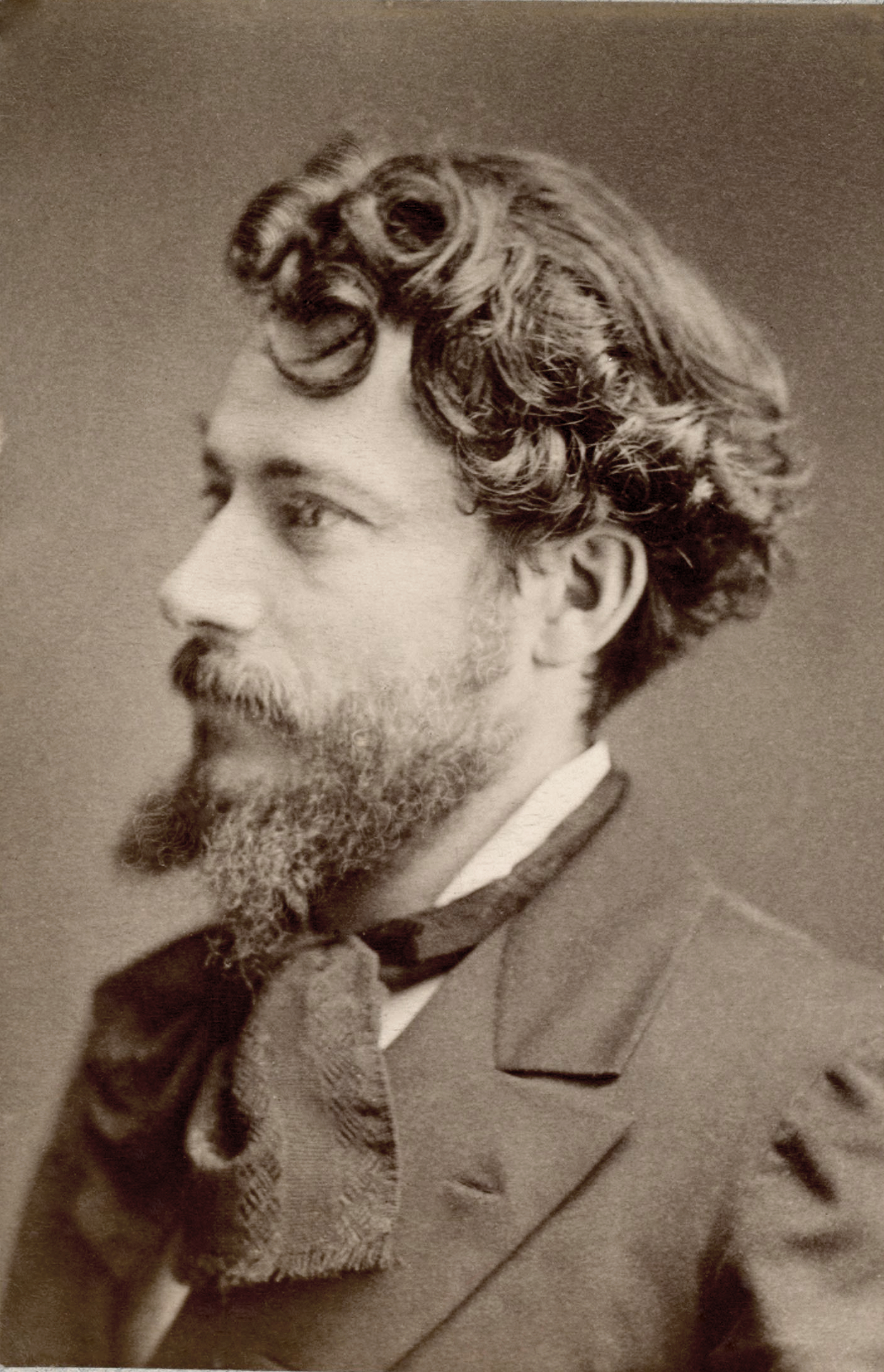
- Aicard ca. 1880
- Born: 4 February 1848; Toulon
- Died: 13 May 1921 (aged 73); Paris
- Writing career
- Language: French
- Genre: Poetry

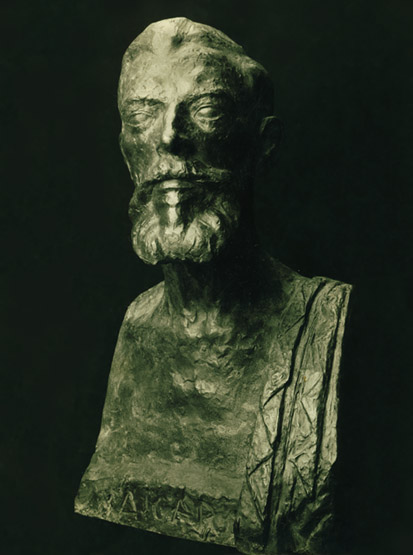
Jean Aicard by the sculptor Victor Nicolas (bronze bust, 1931).

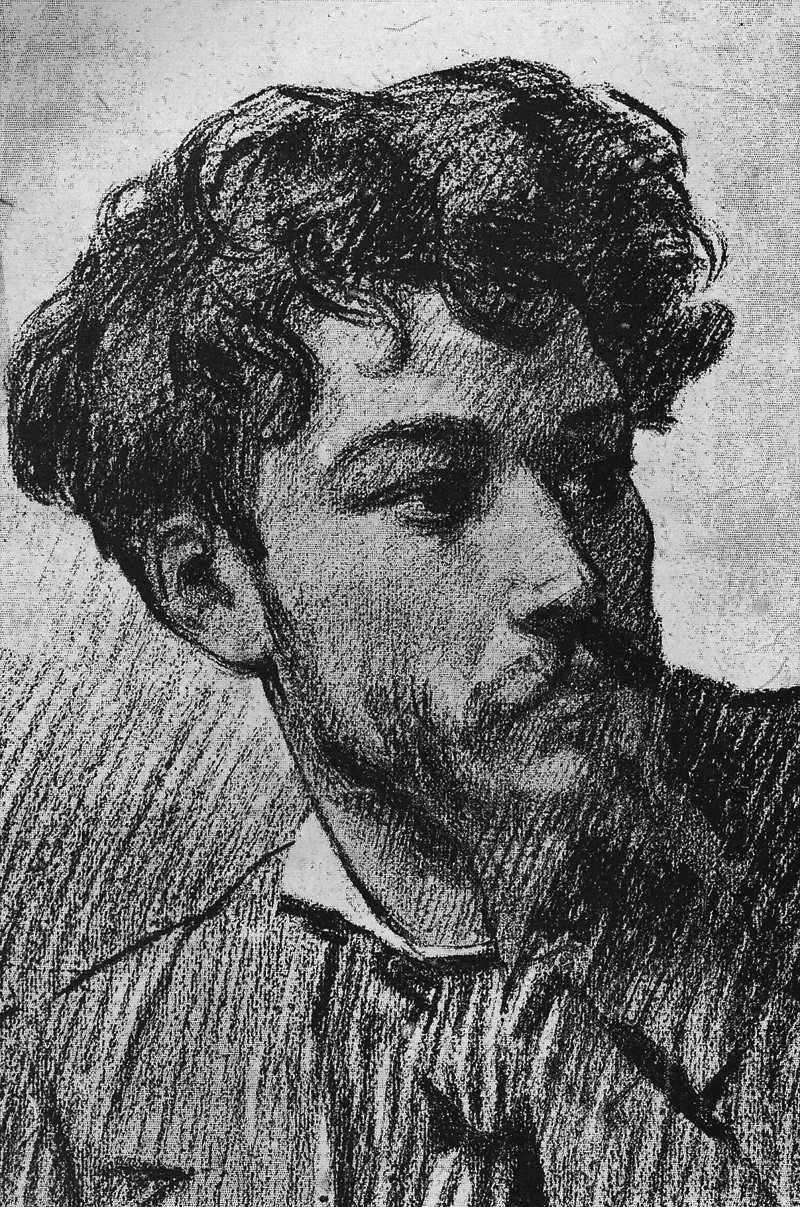
Jean Aicard, sketch by Félix Régamey, ca. 1878.

Jean François Victor Aicard (4 February 1848 – 13 May 1921) was a French poet, dramatist, and novelist.

== Biography ==
He was born in Toulon. His father, Jean Aicard, was a journalist of some distinction, and the son began his career in 1867 with Les Jeunes Croyances, followed in 1870 by a one-act play produced at the Marseille theatre.

His poems include: Les Rebellions et les apaisements (1871); Poèmes de Provence (1874), and La Chanson de l'enfant (1876), both of which were crowned by the Academy; Miette et Noré (1880), a Provençal idyll; Le Livre d'heures de l'amour (1887); Jésus (1896); a collection of poems for children (1912) and Hollande, Algerie (1913), as well as various volumes of war poetry. Of his plays the most successful was Le Père Lebonnard (1890), which was originally produced at the Théâtre Libre. Among his other works are the novels, Le Roi de Camargue (1890), L'Ame d'un enfant (1898) and Tata (1901), Benjamine (1906), Arlette des Mayans (1917), and two volumes of adventure stories, Un Bandit a la Française and its sequel Le fameux chevalier Gaspard de Besse, both in 1919. La Vénus de Milo (1874) was an account of the discovery of the statue from unpublished documents.

He was elected a member of the Académie française in 1909.

He was elected mayor of Solliès-Ville in 1919, had the ruins of the Forbin castle listed as a historic monument and had the Comédie-Française play his play Forbin de Solliès ou le Testament du roi René there.

He died in Paris, 13 May 1921.

== Selected works ==
Poetry

- Les Rebellions et les apaisements (1871)
- Poèmes de Provence (1874)
- La Chanson de l'enfant (1876)
- Miette et Noré (1880)
- Lemartine (1883) which received the prize of the Académie française
- Le Livre d'heures de l'amour (1887)
- Jésus (1896)
- Le témoin (1914-1916)

Novels

- La Vénus de Milo (1874)
- Le Roi de Camargue (1890), translated as King of Camargue (1901)
- En été à l'ombre (1895)
- Notre-Dame-d'Amour (1896), online at:
- L'Âme d'un enfant (1898)
- Tata (1901)
- Benjamine (1906)
- Maurin des Maures (1908)
- L'illustre Maurin (1908)

Dramatic works for stage

- Pygmalion (1878)
- Othello ou le More de Venise (1881)
- Smilis (1884)
- Au Claire de la Lune (1884)
- Mascarille (1885)
- Le Père Lebonnard (1889)
- Don Juan ou la Comédie du siècle (1889)
- La Légende du Cœur (1903)

Preceded by François Coppée	Seat 10; Académie française 1909-1921	Succeeded by Camille Jullian
