= The Little Cafe =

The Little Cafe (French:Le petit café) may refer to one of the following:

- The Little Cafe (play), a 1911 French play by Tristan Bernard
- The Little Cafe (1919 film), a silent French film directed by Raymond Bernard
- The Little Cafe (1931 film), an American French-language film directed by Ludwig Berger
