= A Son from America =

A Son from America may refer to:

- A Son from America (1924 film), a 1925 French silent comedy film
- A Son from America (1932 film), a 1932 French-Hungarian comedy drama film
