= Playboy of Paris =

1930 film

- Sheet music for the theme song of the film
- Directed by: Ludwig Berger
- Written by: Tristan Bernard (play); Percy Heath; Vincent Lawrence
- Produced by: Ludwig Berger
- Starring: Maurice Chevalier; Frances Dee; O.P. Heggie; Stuart Erwin
- Cinematography: Henry W. Gerrard
- Edited by: Merrill G. White
- Music by: Howard Jackson; John Leipold
- Production company: Paramount Pictures
- Distributed by: Paramount Pictures
- Release date: October 31, 1930
- Running time: 82 minutes
- Country: United States
- Language: English

Playboy of Paris is a 1930 American pre-Code musical comedy film directed by Ludwig Berger and starring Maurice Chevalier, Frances Dee (in her film debut), and O.P. Heggie. It was based on a 1911 play The Little Cafe by Tristan Bernard which had previously been adapted into a 1919 French silent film. Paramount produced a separate French-language version Le Petit Café, also starring Chevalier, which broke records for an opening-day attendance in Paris.

The film introduced the song "My Ideal", composed by Richard A. Whiting and Newell Chase with lyrics by Leo Robin, which became a jazz standard.

== Plot ==
Playboy of Paris (1930)

Albert Loriflan, a waiter in a Paris cafe, unexpectedly inherits a large sum of money from a wealthy relative. His unscrupulous boss, Philibert, refuses to release him from his long-term contract in the hope that Albert will buy him off with a large payment. But Albert refuses, and continues to work at the cafe even though he is now very rich. Before long he falls in love with Philibert's daughter Yvonne.

== Cast ==
- Maurice Chevalier as Albert Loriflan
- Frances Dee as Yvonne Phillbert
- O.P. Heggie as Philibert
- Stuart Erwin as Paul Michel
- Eugene Pallette as Pierre Bourdin
- Dorothy Christy as Mlle. Berengere
- Cecil Cunningham as Mlle. Hedwige
- Tyler Brooke as Cadeaux
- William B. Davidson as Monsieur Bannack
- Charles Giblyn as Gastonet

== Bibliography ==
- Bradley, Edwin M. The First Hollywood Musicals: A Critical Filmography Of 171 Features, 1927 Through 1932. McFarland, 2004.
