= The Love Parade =

1929 film by Ernst Lubitsch

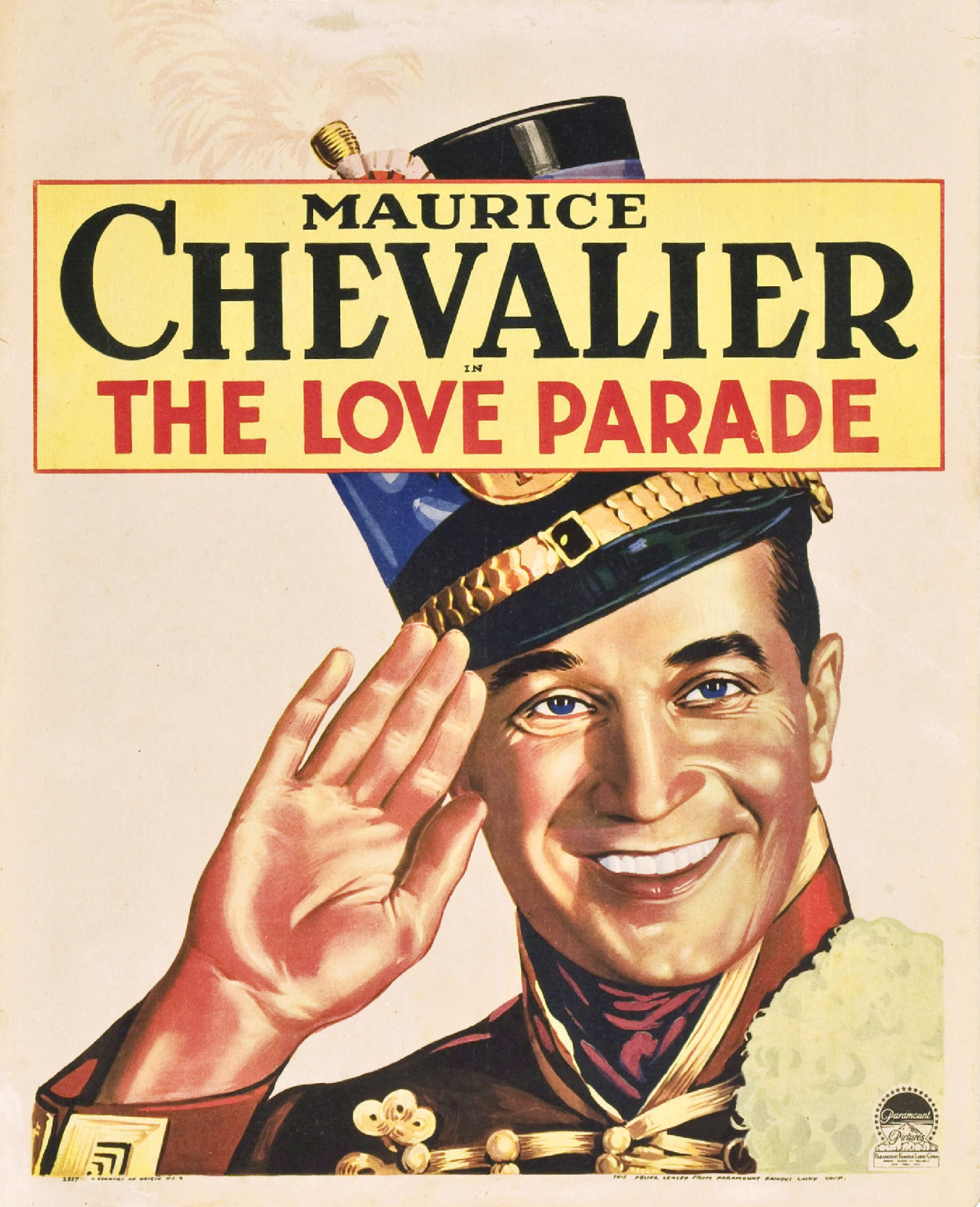
- Window card poster
- Directed by: Ernst Lubitsch
- Written by: Guy Bolton (libretto)
- Story by: Ernest Vajda (film story)
- Based on: Le Prince Consort c.1919 novel by Leon Xanrof Jules Chancel
- Produced by: Ernst Lubitsch
- Starring: Maurice Chevalier; Jeanette MacDonald; Lillian Roth; Eugene Pallette
- Cinematography: Victor Milner
- Edited by: Merrill G. White
- Music by: W. Franke Harling; John Leipold; Oscar Potoker; Max Terr; Songs: Victor Schertzinger (music); Clifford Grey (lyrics)
- Production company: Paramount Famous Lasky Corp.
- Distributed by: Paramount Famous Lasky Corp.
- Release dates: November 19, 1929 (New York City); January 18, 1930 (U.S.)
- Running time: 107 minutes
- Country: United States
- Language: English

The Love Parade is a 1929 American pre-Code musical comedy film, directed by Ernst Lubitsch and starring Maurice Chevalier and Jeanette MacDonald, involving the marital difficulties of Queen Louise of Sylvania (MacDonald) and her consort, Count Alfred Renard (Chevalier). Despite his love for Louise and his promise to be an obedient husband, Count Alfred finds his role as a figurehead unbearable. Its supporting cast features Lupino Lane, Lillian Roth and Eugene Pallette.

The film was directed by Lubitsch from a screenplay by Guy Bolton and Ernest Vajda adapted from the French play Le Prince Consort, written by Jules Chancel and Leon Xanrof. The play had previously been adapted for Broadway in 1905 by William Boosey and Cosmo Gordon Lennox.

The Love Parade is notable for being both the film debut of Jeanette MacDonald and the first "talkie" film made by Ernst Lubitsch. The picture was also released in a French-language version called Parade d'amour. Chevalier had thought that he would never be capable of acting as a Royal courtier, and had to be persuaded by Lubitsch. This huge box-office hit appeared just after the Wall Street crash, and did much to save the fortunes of Paramount.

== Plot ==
The Love Parade (1929)

Count Alfred, military attaché to the Sylvanian Embassy in Paris, is ordered back to Sylvania to report to Queen Louise for a reprimand following a string of scandals, including an affair with the ambassador's wife. In the meantime Queen Louise, ruler of Sylvania in her own right, is royally fed-up with her subjects' preoccupation with whom she will marry (particularly since they would only be a prince consort)

Intrigued rather than offended by Count Alfred's dossier, Queen Louise invites him to dinner when she tries to find a suitable "punishment" for him. Their romance progresses to the point of marriage when, despite his qualms, for love of Louise Alfred agrees to obey the Queen. However, he soon chafes at the standards of living as a consort, which mainly consist of little to do (where even trying to make suggestions to affairs of state) that forces him to take action.

== Cast ==
- Maurice Chevalier as Count Alfred Renard
- Jeanette MacDonald as Queen Louise
- Lupino Lane as Jacques
- Lillian Roth as Lulu
- Eugene Pallette as Minister of War
- E. H. Calvert as Sylvanian Ambassador
- Edgar Norton as Master of Ceremonies
- Lionel Belmore as Prime Minister
- Virginia Bruce as Lady-in-Waiting (Uncredited)

== Production ==
Although The Love Parade was Lubitsch's first sound film, he already displayed a mastery of the technical requirements of the day. In one scene, two couples sing the same song alternately. To do this with the available technology, Lubitsch had two sets built, with an off-camera orchestra between them, and directed both scenes simultaneously. This enabled him to cut back and forth from one scene to the other in editing, something unheard of at the time.

== Music ==
All songs are by Victor Schertzinger (music) and Clifford Grey (lyrics):

- "Ooh, La La" – sung by Lupino Lane
- "Paris, Stay the Same" – sung by Maurice Chevalier and Lupino Lane
- "Dream Lover" – sung by Jeanette MacDonald and chorus, reprise sung by Jeanette MacDonald
- "Anything to Please the Queen" – sung by Jeanette MacDonald and Maurice Chevalier
- "My Love Parade" – sung by Maurice Chevalier and Jeanette MacDonald
- "Let's Be Common" – sung by Lupino Lane and Lillian Roth
- "March of the Grenadiers" – sung by Jeanette MacDonald and chorus, reprise sung by chorus
- "Nobody's Using It Now" – sung by Maurice Chevalier
- "The Queen Is Always Right" – sung by Lupino Lane, Lillian Roth and chorus

== Reception ==
The film made a reported £125,000 in Britain.

== Awards and honors ==
The Love Parade was nominated for six Academy Awards:

1929–1930 Academy Awards

Category	Receptor	Result
Outstanding Production	Paramount Famous Lasky (Ernst Lubitsch)	Nominated
Best Director	Ernst Lubitsch	Nominated
Best Actor	Maurice Chevalier	Nominated
Best Art Direction	Hans Dreier	Nominated
Best Cinematography	Victor Milner	Nominated
Best Sound Recording	Franklin Hansen	Nominated

== See also ==
- List of early sound feature films (1926–1929)
