= Pierre Veber =

French playwright and writer (1869–1942)

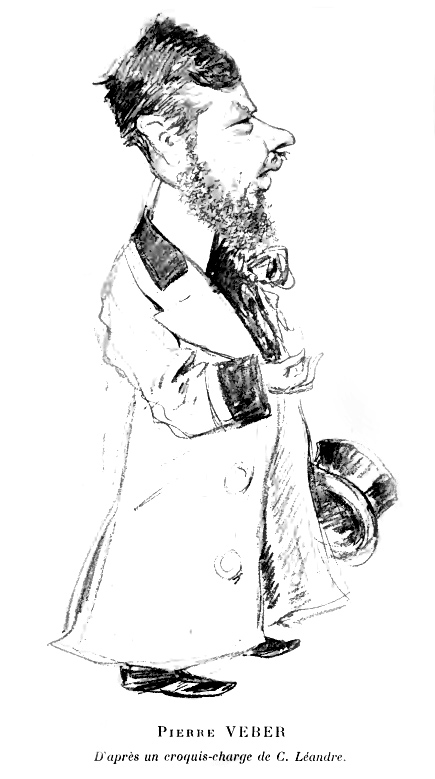
Pierre Veber caricatured by Charles Léandre

Pierre-Eugène Veber (15 May 1869 – 20 August 1942) was a French playwright and writer.

== Biography ==
Pierre Veber was the brother of the painter Jean Veber, and the brother-in-law of both René Doumic and Tristan Bernard. His family was quite large, as he himself points out in the preface to the book X… Roman Impromptu: "If seventy cities vie for the honour of having given birth to me, it's not because I'm ten times more famous than Homer, but simply because the name I bear is more common." At the time, there were several authors and scriptwriters with the same surname, such as Jean-Pierre Veber and Serge Veber; with whom Pierre worked from time to time.

Pierre Veber is the father of journalist and author Pierre-Gilles Veber, and of screenwriter Serge Veber. He is also the grandfather of screenwriter and film director Francis Veber, and the great-grandfather of author Sophie Audouin-Mamikonian.

Little is known about his youth. He himself explained: "My studies were quite limited, of which I am not proud." By 1889, his work had already been published in the literary periodical Gil Blas, as André Antoine says in his journal entry from 25: "This evening, Rue Blanche, we are being visited by two newcomers, Tristan Bernard and Pierre Veber, two young journalists of great intellect who, each week, write for Gil Blas, a news magazine illustrated by Jean Veber." In 1892, Pierre Veber contributed to the magazine Le Chasseur de Chevelures (The Hunter of Locks), under the guidance of Tristan Bernard. This humorous newspaper had only two issues, in 1892 and 1893, and in the latter year Pierre Veber was credited as co-author in the statement: "Tristan Bernard: honest editor; Pierre Veber: corrupt editor."

Pierre Veber was a prolific writer, who, with a forty-year long career, produced around one hundred slapstick comedies, vaudevilles, opera libretti; and nearly fifty novels and collections of short stories, along with tales both humorous and ironic. Nearly half of his plays were written in collaboration with one or two other authors, to whom he brought his great elegance and ease of writing, which he admitted with humour in the preface to his Théâtre Incomplet: "The theatre is, for a writer, a delightful distraction which allows a break to be taken from writing. We listen to domesticated fools who ramble on; we note down their remarks; we imagine their gestures. And that makes the play."

His frequent playwriting collaboration with Maurice Hennequin, in particular, was in competition with the playwright duo of Robert de Flers and Gaston Arman de Caillavet, a partnership that was very popular at the time. Veber lent a hand to other writers from time to time, such as Alfred Capus, Georges Courteline et Léon Xanrof. His work as a playwright continued almost until the Second World War, when he was nearing the age of seventy.

He also wrote novels in collaboration; a pursuit less common than collaborating in theatre. It was Veber himself who, in 1895, had the idea for X… Roman Impromptu: a novel "without preconceived plan and without a definite subject". It was written by five authors: Georges Courteline, Jules Renard, George Auriol, Tristan Bernard, and Pierre Veber himself. In an order determined by chance, each author wrote a chapter following on from the last one. This meant that the plot changed each chapter, following the whims and imagination of whoever happened to be writing. The only constraint was that the protagonist not die and that no character must change sex. The novel first appeared in serialised form in the literary periodical Gil Blas, from 4 April to 21 May 1895. This 'steeplechase novel' or 'choral novel', renamed 'impromptu novel', was repeatedly published by Flammarion. Veber also wrote some short stories in collaboration with French writer Henry Gauthier-Villars (Willy).

Some of his plays experienced great success, such as Le Monsieur de cinq heures, which was performed 568 times – a considerable number at the time. Some were even later adapted for cinema, while others were translated into English and performed in London and New York City. He sometimes wrote under the pen name Bill Sharp.

== Publications ==
=== Theatre ===
==== 1897–1910 ====
- 1897: Dix ans après, comedy in one act, with Lucien Muhlfeld, premiered in Paris at the Théâtre de l'Odéon 5 April 1897
- 1898: Lagourdette, one-act play, premiered in Paris at the Champ de foire 15 March 1898
- 1898: Julien n'est pas un ingrat, one-act play, premiered in Paris at the Théâtre Antoine 14 May 1898
- 1898 (published date): M. & Mme Lhomme, published by F. Juven, 262 p.
- 1899: L'Ami de la maison, comedy in one act, premiered in Paris at the Théâtre des Capucines 17 January 1899
- 1899: Que Suzanne n'en sache rien !, comedy in three acts, premiered in Paris at the Théâtre Antoine 11 March 1899
- 1899: L'Affaire Champignon, one-act fantasia, with Georges Courteline, published in 1899, premiered in Paris at the Scala 8 September 1899
- 1899: L'Élu des femmes, comedy in four acts, with Victor de Cottens, premiered in Paris at the Théâtre du Palais-Royal 28 October 1899
- 1900: Un bain qui chauffe, comedy in one act, premiered in Paris at the Théâtre Antoine 15 August 1900
- 1900: Blancheton père et fils, one-act fantasia, with Georges Courteline, published in 1900, premiered in Paris at the Théâtre des Capucines 26 October 1900
- 1900: Main gauche, comedy in three acts, premiered in Paris at the Théâtre Antoine 15 November 1900
- 1900: Mademoiselle George, operetta in three acts, with Victor de Cottens, music by Louis Varney, premiered in Paris at the Théâtre des Variétés 2 December 1900
- 1901: La Dame du commissaire, comedy in three acts, premiered in Paris at the théâtre de Cluny 20 April 1901
- 1901: Ma fée, comedy in three acts, with Maurice Soulié, premiered in Paris at the Théâtre de l'Odéon 4 May 1901
- 1901: La Mariotte, comedy in two acts, with Maurice Soulié, premiered in Paris at the Théâtre Antoine 3 November 1901
- 1902: Loute, comedy in four acts, premiered in Paris at the Théâtre des Variétés 17 May 1902
- 1904: Son pied quelque part, one-act play, premiered in Paris at the Théâtre des Mathurins 6 April 1904
- 1905: L' Amourette, three-act play, premiered in Paris at the Théâtre Antoine 3 February 1905
- 1905: Chambre à part, comedy in three acts, premiered in Paris at the Théâtre du Palais-Royal 22 April 1905
- 1905:Florette & Patapon, three-act play, with Maurice Hennequin, premiered in Paris at the Théâtre des Nouveautés 20 October 1905
- 1905: Gonzague, vaudeville comedy in one act, premiered in Paris at the Théâtre des Deux-Masques 5 November 1905, adapted as an Opera buffa in 1931
- 1906: L'Extra, one-act play, premiered in Paris at the Théâtre du Palais Royal 4 October 1906
- 1906: Vous n'avez rien à déclarer ?, play in three acts, with Maurice Hennequin, premiered in Paris at the Théâtre des Nouveautés 6 October 1906
- 1906: En douceur, comedy in one act, with Léon Xanrof premiered in Paris at the Théâtre des Mathurins 23 October 1906
- 1907: Le Maître à aimer, comedy in one act, with Hugues Delorme, premiered in Paris at the Théâtre de l'Odéon 29 May 1907
- 1907: Vingt jours à l'ombre, three-act play, with Maurice Hennequin, premiered in Paris at the Théâtre des Nouveautés 20 November 1907
- 1907: Le Prince de Pilsen, operetta, with Victor de Cottens, adapted from Frank Pixley, music by Gustav Luders, performed at Olympia 14 December 1907
- 1907: Le Mouton, comedy in one act, with Marcel Gerbidon, premiered in Paris at the Théâtre des Arts 23 December 1907
- 1908: Qui perd gagne, five-act play, adapted from the novel by Alfred Capus, premiered in Paris at the Théâtre Réjane 14 March 1908
- 1908: Monsieur Mésian, comedy in one act, premiered in Paris at the Théâtre des Arts 27 October 1908, reprised at the Grand Guignol in 1921
- 1909: Une grosse affaire, three-act play, with Maurice Hennequin, premiered in Paris at the Théâtre des Nouveautés 23 January 1909
- 1909: Les Grands, four-act play, with Serge Basset, premiered in Paris at the Théâtre de l'Odéon 26 January 1909, adapted for film in 1926 and 1936
- 1909: M. Trulle et le vicomte, one-act play, premiered in Paris at the Théâtre du Trocadéro 3 June 1909
- 1909: La Vierge du forum, one-act fantasia, with Guillaume Wolff, premiered in Paris at the Comédie-Royale 7 June 1909
- 1909: L'Écu, comedy in one act, premiered in Paris at the Comédie-Royale 7 July 1909
- 1910: Noblesse oblige!, three-act play, with Maurice Hennequin, premiered in Paris at the Théâtre des Nouveautés 6 January 1909
- 1910: Tais-toi, mon cœur!, three-act play, with Maurice Hennequin, premiered in Paris at the Théâtre du Palais-Royal 6 April 1910

==== 1911–1940 ====
- 1911: La Femme et les pantins, one-act play, premiered in Paris at the Théâtre Michel 2 February 1911
- 1911: La Gamine, four-act comedy, with Henry de Gorsse, premiered in Paris at the Théâtre de la Renaissance 24 March 1911
- 1911: Le soldat de chocolat, operetta in three acts and four scenes, adapted from George Bernard Shaw's Arms and the Man, music by Oscar Straus, premiered in Brussels at Galeries Saint-Hubert le 8 September 1911, reprised in Paris at the Théâtre de l'Apollo 8 November 1912
- 1911: Les Petites Étoiles, operetta in three acts, music by Henri Hirschmann, premiered at the Théâtre de l'Apollo 23 December 1911
- 1912: En garde !, comedy in three acts, with Alfred Capus, premiered in Paris at the Théâtre de la Renaissance 19 March 1912
- 1912: La Présidente, three-act play, with Maurice Hennequin, premiered in Paris at the Théâtre du Palais-Royal 27 November 1912, performed on Broadway in 1913 and 1914 under the title Madam President. Adapted by Anne Caldwell and Otto Harbach into the Broadway musical Oh, Please!
- 1912: Une loge pour Faust, comedy in one act, performed at the Théâtre des Arts 13 October 1912
- 1912: Le Grand Nom, at the Théâtre des Arts, by Victor Léon and Léo Feld, adaptation from Pierre Veber 8 November 1912
- 1912: Les Bonnes Relations, with Claude Roland, performed at Théâtre Michel 26 November 1912
- 1913: Le Bonheur, comedy in one act, premiered in Paris at the Grand Guignol 12 November 1913
- 1913: Un fils d'Amérique, comedy in four acts, with Marcel Gerbidon, premiered in Paris at the Théâtre de la Renaissance 29 December 1913, mise en scène by Abel Tarride, adapted for film in 1925
- 1914: L'Essayeuse, one-act play, premiered in Paris at the Théâtre Français 12 July 1914
- 1914 : Manœuvres d'automne, three-act operetta by K. de Bakonyi, adapted from Pierre Veber, music by Emmerich Kálmán, performed at the Théâtre des Célestins in Lyon 20 March 1914
- 1916: Le Poilu, comedy-operetta, music by H. Maurice Jacquet, premiered in Paris at the Théâtre du Palais-Royal 14 January 1916
- 1916: La Charmante Rosalie ou le mariage par procuration, musical-comedy in one act, music by Henri Hirschmann, premiered in Paris at l'Opéra-Comique 18 February 1916
- 1916: Madame et son filleul, comedy in three acts, with Maurice Hennequin and Henry de Gorsse, premiered in Paris at the Théâtre du Palais-Royal 12 September 1916
- 1916: Une femme, six hommes et un singe, fantasia, with Yves Mirande, performed at the Théâtre Michel
- 1916: Un Baiser sur le front, one-act play, no indication of theatre
- 1917: Chichi, vaudeville comedy in three acts, with de Gorsse, premiered in Paris at the Théâtre de l'Athénée 25 January 1917
- 1917: Un réveillon au Père-Lachaise, comedy in two acts and three scenes, with de Gorsse, premiered in Paris at the Grand Guignol 15 March 1917
- 1917/1918: Le Service de la du Barry, comedy in one act
- 1919: La Dernière Grisette, drama in one act, premiered in Paris at the Grand Guignol 14 March 1919
- 1919: L'Âme de l'ennemi, drama in one act, premiered in Paris at the Grand Guignol 14 March 1919
- 1920: Et moi, j'te dis qu'elle t'a fait d'l'oeil, three-act play, with Maurice Hennequin, premiered in Paris at the Théâtre du Palais Royal 12 March 1920, adapted for film in 1935
- 1920: Huguette au volant, comedy in four acts, with Jules Chancel, premiered in Paris at the Théâtre de la Porte-Saint-Martin 9 July 1920
- 1920: Une riche affaire, comedy in one act, with Pierre Montrel, performed at the Grand Guignol
- 1922: La Seconde Nuit de noces, with Bilhaud and Maurice Hennequin
- 1924: Un péché de jeunesse, comedy in one act, premiered in Paris at the Grand Guignol 22 March 1924
- 1924: Le Monsieur de cinq heures, three-act play, with Maurice Hennequin, performed at the Théâtre du Palais-Royal
- 1925: Quand on est trois, operetta in three acts, with Serge Veber, lyrics by Albert Willemetz, music by Joseph Szulc, performed at the Théâtre des Capucines 20 April 1925
- 1925: La Bayadère, operetta in three acts, lyrics by Bertal et Maubon, music by Emmerich Kálmán, performed at the Théâtre Mogador in Paris and at the Théâtre des Célestins in Lyon
- 1925: Sous les étoiles (Monsieur Beaucaire), operetta in three acts, lyrics by André Baugé, music by André Messager, performed at the Théâtre Marigny
- 1926: Divin mensonge, operetta in three acts and six scenes, couplets by Hughes Delorme, music by Joseph Szulc
- 1926: Le Système D ou Dodoche et Lulu, vaudeville in three acts, with Henry de Gorsse and Marcel Guillemaud
- 1927: La Ménagère apprivoisée, one-act play, premiered in Geneva at the Amis de l'Instruction 6 April 1927
- 1927: On ne roule pas Antoinette, three-act play, with Maurice Hennequin, performed at the Théâtre du Palais-Royal
- 1928: En bordée, vaudeville in three acts and four scenes, with André Heuzé, premiered in Paris at the Scala 9 February 1928
- 1929: L'Avant de ces dames, vaudeville in three acts and four scenes, with André Heuzé, premiered in Paris at the Scala 14 February 1929
- 1929: La Femme au chat, comedy in three acts, with Henry de Gorsse, adapted from the Italian work by Oreste Poggio, premiered in Paris at the Théâtre Daunou 18 March 1929, mise en scène by Harry Baur
- 1930: 300 à l'heure, vaudeville in three acts, with Victor de Cottens
- 1931: Sans tambour ni trompette, operetta in three acts and four scenes, music by Henri Casadesus, premiered in Paris at the Folies-Wagram 27 March 1931
- 1931: Gonzague, Opera buffa in one act, by René Kerdyk, adapted from Pierre Veber's 1905 work, music by Jacques Ibert, premiered at the Opéra de Monaco 17 December 1931, reprised 3 April 1935 at l'Opéra Comique in Paris
- 1936: L'Uranius Antonin ou Une pièce unique, comedy in one act, performed at the Gala de la pièce en un acte in Paris 15 February 1936
- 1940: Ma Dame est avec moi, reprised at the Théâtre du Palais Royal

==== Undated theatrical works ====
- On lit dans le Forban, one-act play
- La danse à la mode, one-act play
- Le Fiancé, one-act play
- Paroles en l'air, one act, with Léon Abric
- Épous'la, operetta, music by Henri Hirschmann

==== English Broadway adaptations ====
- Sunny Days (Feb 8, 1928 - May 5, 1928; revival Oct 1, 1928 - Oct 27, 1928)
- Oh, Please (Dec 17, 1926 - Feb 1927)
- A Kiss in a Taxi (Aug 25, 1925 - Oct 1925)
- Madam President (Sep 15, 1913 - Jan 1914)
- The Runaway (Oct 9, 1911 - Dec 1911)
- The Girl from Rector's (Feb 1, 1909 - Jul 1909)
- Twenty Days in the Shade (Jan 20, 1908 - Mar 1908)
- Brother Jacques (Dec 5, 1904 - Jan 1905)

=== Novels and short stories ===
(Note the dates may not be the first edition release dates)

- 1894: Les enfants s'amusent, short stories, with Henry Gauthier-Villars, H. Simonis Empis edition, Paris
- 1894: Vous m'en direz tant !, with Tristan Bernard, Flammarion edition, 305 p.
- 1894: Une passade, with Henry Gauthier-Villars, Calmann-Lévy edition, 106 p.
- 1895: Une vie de Bill Sharp, sequel to Dans les coins, H. Simonis Empis edition, 240 pages,
- 1895: Les Veber's, satirical writings, illustrated with 350 drawings by Jean Veber, Émile Testard edition, 183 p.
- 1895: L'innocente du logis, collection of humorous tales, Flammarion edition, 247 p.
- 1895: X... Roman impromptu, with Georges Courteline, Jules Renard, George Auriol and Tristan Bernard. First appeared in serial form in Gil Blas. It was published and re-published by Flammarion, appearing in the collection Les auteurs gais, 242 pages.
- 1896: Chez les snobs, novel, 2nd edition published by Ollendorff, 299 p.
- 1898: L'Aventure, H. Simonis Empis edition, 280 pages, re-published by Arthème Fayard in 1929, appears in the collection Le Livre de demain, and in the 1941 collection Modern Bibliothèque
- 1899: Les Couches profondes, novel, H. Simonis Empis edition, 305 p.
- 1900: Amour, amour..., novel, H. Simonis Empis edition, 380 pages, re-published by Arthème Fayard in 1929, appears in the Collection de bibliothèque
- 1907: L'École des ministres, La Vie parisienne edition, 239 p.
- 1908: Les Belles Histoires, Stock edition, 251 p.
- 1912: Les Rentrées, Calmann-Lévy edition, Nouvelle Collection illustrée, Paris, 126 p.
- 1914: Tite et Bérénice, Ferenczi edition, 256 pages, appears in the collection l'Esprit français, Paris
- 1919: Mademoiselle Fanny, Flammarion edition, 249 p.
- 1919: Vie des personnages obscurs, Fasquelle edition, 319 p.
- 1919: L'Homme qui vendit son âme au diable, sequel to La Gloire de madame Lambrun, Calmann-Lévy edition, 301 p.
- 1921: Une aventure de la Pompadour, novel, J. Ferenczi et fils edition, Paris, 255 p.
- 1921: Archytas-roi sequel to La Jolie madame Livran, J. Ferenczi edition, 235 p.
- 1924: Pensées d'un mercanti, Ferenczi et fils edition, 62 p.
- 1924: La Seconde vie de Napoléon Ier, novel, J. Ferenczi et fils edition, Paris, 264 p.
- 1925: Antoine ou l'Ingénu malgré lui, Rasmussen edition, 64 p.
- 1930: Samson, Alcan edition, 167 pages, appears in the collection Acteurs et actrices d'autrefois, documents et anecdotes
- 1931: Tout mais pas ça !, novel, J. Ferenczi et fils edition, Paris
- 1931: L'Œuvre lithographique de Jean Veber, with Louis Lacroix, H. Fleury edition, 74 p.
- 1933: Bébé-Rose, novel, J. Ferenczi et fils edition, Paris, 287 p.
- 1934: Une heure d'amour, J. Ferenczi et fils edition, Paris
- 1934: La Main dans le sac, Fayard edition
- 1935: Kerbiniou, novel, J. Ferenczi et fils edition, Paris, 365 p.
- 1936: La Chair est faible, novel, J. Ferenczi et fils edition, appears in the collection Le livre moderne illustré, Paris
- 1938: Une nuit dans la montagne, novel, J. Ferenczi et fils edition, Paris, 158 p.
- 1950 (Rouff edition publication date): Une fichue mission, with Maurice Hennequin, Rouff edition, 128 p.

== Filmography ==
- Floretta and Patapon, directed by Mario Caserini (Italy, 1913, based on the play Florette & Patapon)
- Madame la Presidente, directed by Frank Lloyd (1916, based on the play La Présidente)
- Le avventure di Colette, directed by R. Savarese (Italy, 1916, based on the play La Gamine)
- Camere separate, directed by Gennaro Righelli (Italy, 1917, based on the play Chambre à part)
- The Studio Girl, directed by Charles Giblyn (1918, based on the play La Gamine)
- Venti giorni all'ombra, directed by Gennaro Righelli (Italy, 1918, based on the play Vingt jours à l'ombre)
- Les Grands, directed by Georges Denola (France, 1918, based on the play Les Grands)
- Noblesse oblige, directed by Marcello Dudovich (Italy, 1918, based on the play Noblesse oblige)
- Madame et son filleul, directed by Georges Monca and Charles Prince (France, 1919, based on the play Madame et son filleul)
- L'Homme qui vendit son âme au diable, directed by Pierre Caron (France, 1921, based on the novel L'Homme qui vendit son âme au diable)
- Coeur léger, directed by Robert Saidreau (France, 1923, based on a short story)
- Les Grands, directed by Henri Fescourt (France, 1924, based on the play Les Grands)
- A Son from America, directed by Henri Fescourt (France, 1925, based on the play Un fils d'Amérique)
- A Kiss in a Taxi, directed by Clarence G. Badger (1927, based on the play Le Monsieur de cinq heures)
- Floretta and Patapon, directed by Amleto Palermi (Italy, 1927, based on the play Florette & Patapon)
- En bordée, directed by Henry Wulschleger and Joe Francis (France, 1931, based on the play En bordée)
- A Son from America, directed by Carmine Gallone (France, 1932, based on the play Un fils d'Amérique)
- Trois cents à l'heure, directed by Willy Rozier (France, 1935, based on the play 300 à l'heure)
- Et moi, j'te dis qu'elle t'a fait de l'œil, directed by Jack Forrester (France, 1935, based on the play Et moi, j'te dis qu'elle t'a fait d'l'œil)
- Le champion de ces dames, directed by René Jayet (France, 1935, based on the play L'Avant de ces dames)
- You Can't Fool Antoinette, directed by Paul Madeux (France, 1936, based on the play On ne roule pas Antoinette)
- Les Grands, directed by Félix Gandéra (France, 1936, based on the play Les Grands)
- Vous n'avez rien à déclarer?, directed by Léo Joannon (France, 1937, based on the play Vous n'avez rien à déclarer?)
- Le Monsieur de cinq heures, directed by Pierre Caron (France, 1938, based on the play Le Monsieur de cinq heures)
- La Présidente, directed by Fernand Rivers (France, 1938, based on the play La Présidente)
- Et moi, j'te dis qu'elle t'a fait de l'œil, directed by Maurice Gleize (France, 1950, based on the play Et moi, j'te dis qu'elle t'a fait d'l'œil)
- La mujer del león, directed by Mario C. Lugones (Argentina, 1951, based on the play Le Monsieur de cinq heures)
- The Piano Tuner Has Arrived, directed by Duilio Coletti (Italy, 1952, based on the play Gonzague)
- Mademoiselle Gobete, directed by Pietro Germi (Italy, 1952, based on the play La Présidente)
- Música, alegría y amor, directed by Enrique Carreras (Argentina, 1956, based on the play Loute)
- En bordée, directed by Pierre Chevalier (France, 1958, based on the play En bordée)
- Vous n'avez rien à déclarer?, directed by Clément Duhour (France, 1959, based on the play Vous n'avez rien à déclarer?)
- La Presidentessa, directed by Luciano Salce (Italy, 1977, based on the play La Présidente)
