= The Studio Girl =

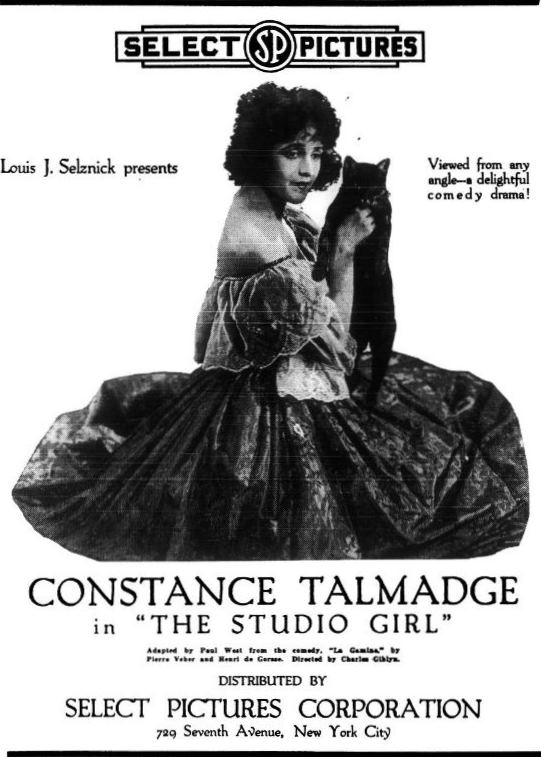
- Advertisement
- Directed by: Charles Giblyn
- Written by: Pierre Veber (play); Henry de Gorsse (play); Paul West
- Produced by: Lewis J. Selznick
- Starring: Constance Talmadge; Earle Foxe; Edna Earle
- Cinematography: Hal Young
- Production company: Select Pictures
- Distributed by: Select Pictures
- Release date: January 1918
- Running time: 50 minutes
- Country: United States
- Languages: Silent; English intertitles

The Studio Girl is a 1918 American silent comedy film directed by Charles Giblyn and starring Constance Talmadge, Earle Foxe, and Edna Earle.

== Cast ==
- Constance Talmadge as Celia Laird
- Earle Foxe as Frazer Ordway
- Edna Earle as Adriana Peroni
- Johnny Hines as Obediah Daw
- Gertrude Norman as Mrs. Daw
- Isabel O'Madigan as Harriet Farnum
- Grace Barton as Rachel Farnum
- Ferdinand Tidmarsh as Dr. Walter Grierson

== Bibliography ==
- Donald W. McCaffrey & Christopher P. Jacobs. Guide to the Silent Years of American Cinema. Greenwood Publishing, 1999. ISBN 0-313-30345-2
