= Solfilmen =

Swedish animation about daylight hours

- Solfilmen, from Aktuellt on April 27, 1990.
- Country of origin: Sweden
- Original language: Swedish

Original release
- Network: SVT
- Release: March 1963

Solfilmen (lit. 'The sun film') is a short animated presentation of the weekly sunrise and sunset times for locations in Sweden, broadcast by Sveriges Television since 1963.

It is broadcast once a week as part of the news programme Aktuellt on SVT2, from the first Friday after Kiruna's first sunrise of the year to Midsummer. It shows the sunrise and sunset times for Lund, Stockholm, Lycksele, and Kiruna. The animation shows a Sun rising and over Sweden, and setting into a bed of clouds. The background music is an instrumental version of French traditional song Le fiacre, by Léon Xanrof.

Solfilmen was first shown in March 1963 in black and white, and stopped broadcasting by Midsummer 1963, returning January 1969 in color format. Initially, sunrise and sunset times for Stockholm, Lund and Luleå were given.

Later, in 2002, SVT changed the cities in the list by replacing Luleå with Kiruna, and again in 2008, adding Lycksele.
