= Henry de Gorsse =

French author and playwright (1868–1936)

- Born: 19 March 1868; Bagnères-de-Luchon
- Died: 7 March 1936 (aged 67); Paris
- Occupations: Writer, dramatist

Auguste Joseph Henry de Gorsse (19 March 1868 – 7 March 1936) was a French writer, playwright, screenwriter and lyricist.

Born in Bagnères-de-Luchon, de Gorsse was educated at Toulouse and Paris. He married Emma Samson. A prolific writer, Henry de Gorsse authored many plays, comedies, operettas and vaudevilles, often in collaboration with other writers.

Henry de Gorsse died in Paris in 1936, at age 67. He was the uncle of the lawyer and historian Pierre de Gorsse as well as the brother of another historian, Bertrand de Gorsse.

== Works ==
Author

- 1894: Monseigneur, 1-act comedy by Henry de Gorsse and Charles Meyreuil
- 1895: Paris au pied du mur, by Henry de Gorsse and Jules Oudot
- 1896: L'Impôt sur la Revue, 1-acr news by Henry de Gorsse and Jules Oudot
- 1896: Ballottage, 1-act comedy by Henry de Gorsse and Jules Oudot
- 1896: Tonton, operetta in 1 act, by Henry de Gorsse and Fernand Beissier, music by Paul Blétry
- 1897: Au Chat qui pelote, operetta in 1 act, by Henry de Gorsse and Jules Oudot
- 1898: Le roi du timbre-poste, Henry de Gorsse and Gérard de Beauregard
- 1899: Les Plumes du paon, Henry de Gorsse and Gérard de Beauregard
- 1899: Caillette, comedy in one act, by Henry de Gorsse and Charles Meyreuil
- 1901: Les Marraines du siècle, féerie à grand spectacle, by Henry de Gorsse and Maurice Froyez
- 1902: L'Auréole, 5-act comedy by Henry de Gorsse and Jules Chancel
- 1903: Miche, ou Le nez qui remue, comédie bouffe (operetta) in 3 acts by Henry de Gorsse and Maurice Soulié
- 1904: Petit-Jeannot; Fée Totorote; Pour être seuls !; Cocard et Rataboul; Le Sorcier; L'Edelweiss; La Soirée Potiron, by Henry de Gorsse.
- 1904: La Jeunesse de Cyrano de Bergerac by Henry de Gorsse and Joseph Jacquin (with a preface by Edmond Rostand)
- 1905: Les Cadets de Gascogne by Henry de Gorsse and Joseph Jacquin
- 1905: Madame l'Ordonnance, vaudeville in 3 acts by Henry de Gorsse and Jules Chancel
- 1905: Folle escapade; Les Alouettes d'eau; Le Grillon by Henry de Gorsse
- 1906: Allo !... de Vichy !..., revue féerique in 2 acts and 10 tableaux, by Henry de Gorsse and Georges Nanteuil
- 1907: Le Coup de Jarnac, vaudeville in 3 acts by Henry de Gorsse and Maurice de Marsan
- 1907: Esprit, es-tu là... ?, vaudeville in 1 act by Henry de Gorsse
- 1907: Le 1.000e constat, vaudeville in 3 acts by Henry de Gorsse and Louis Forest.
- 1910: M. Toto, premier policier de France, by Henry de Gorsse
- 1910: Arsène Lupin vs. Herlock Sholmes, play in 4 acts and 15 tableaux from the novels by Maurice Leblanc by Henry de Gorsse and Victor Darlay, music by Marius Baggers. (performed at Théâtre du Châtelet le 28 octobre 1910)
- 1911: La Gamine, 4-act comedy by Henry de Gorsse and Pierre Veber (performed at théâtre de la Renaissance 24 March 1911)
- 1912: Cinq semaines en aéroplane by Henry de Gorsse
- 1913: Le Procureur Haliers, 4-act play, adaptée after Paul Lindau, by Henry de Gorsse and Louis Forest, Théâtre Antoine, 15 October
- 1916: Madame et son filleul, 3-act play by Henry de Gorsse, Maurice Hennequin, Pierre Veber, adapted by Georges Monca
- 1917: Le Système D ou Dodoche et Lulu, vaudeville in three acts by Henry de Gorsse, Pierre Veber and Marcel Guillemaud
- 1921: L'aeroplane invisible by Henry de Gorsse
- 1921: Un réveillon au Père-Lachaise, play in three little acts by Henry de Gorsse and Pierre Veber
- 1921: Trois poules pour un coq, vaudeville in three acts by Henry de Gorsse and Nicolas Nancey
- 1921: Oscar ! tu le seras, vaudeville in three acts by Henry de Gorsse and Nicolas Nancey.
- 1921: Dolly I Love You !, operetta in three acts by Henry de Gorsse and Victor Darlay, music by Félix Fourdrain.
- 1922: Le Coup d'Abélard, vaudeville in three acts by Henry de Gorsse and Nicolas Nancey
- 1922: L'Enfance pyrénéenne d'Edmond Rostand; les années de Luchon; les premiers essais
- 1923: Chouquette et son as, vaudeville in three acts by Henry de Gorsse, Maurice Hennequin, Marcel Guillemaud
- 1923: Un homme sur la paille, comédie-vaudeville in three acts. After a short story by André Birabeau, Nicolas Nancey and Henry de Gorsse
- 1924: Le Yacht mystérieux
- 1924: Par-dessus les moulins, 3-act play by Henry de Gorsse and René Peter
- 1925: La Hussarde: operetta in three acts, by Henry de Gorsse, Victor Darlay and Georges Nanteuil. Music by Félix Fourdrain
- 1925: J'aurai Lulu. Vaudeville in three acts by Henry de Gorsse and André Mycho
- 1927: Le Petit Héros du Bled, by Henry de Gorsse and Pierre Guitet-Vauquelin
- 1927: Dame au domino, operetta in three acts, by Henry de Gorsse and Victor Darlay, music by Henri Hirschmann
- 1928: Chichi, comédie-vaudeville in three acts by Henry de Gorsse and Pierre Veber
- 1929: La Femme au chat comedy in 3 acts by Henry de Gorsse and Pierre Veber after the Italian play by Oreste Poggio, mise en scène Harry Baur, Théâtre Daunou, 18 May
- 1931: Sans tambour ni trompette: operetta in three acts and four tableaux. Libretto by Henry de Gorsse and Pierre Veber, music by de Henri Casadesus
- 1935: Le Petit Don Quichotte, Henry de Gorsse and Pierre Humble.

Screenwriter

- 1910: L'Infidélité d'Ernest
- 1910: Mil Adultérios, directed by João Colas
- 1916: Le avventure di Colette, directed by R. Savarese, d'après la pièce La Gamine d'Henry de Gorsse and Pierre Veber
- 1918: The Studio Girl, directed by Charles Giblyn after the play La Gamine by Henry de Gorsse and Pierre Veber
- 1919: Madame et son filleul, directed by Georges Monca and Charles Prince after the eponymous play by Henry de Gorsse and Pierre Veber
- 1934: Le Mystère Imberger or Le Spectre de Monsieur Imberger, directed by Jacques Séverac
- 1936: La Petite Dame du wagon-lit, directed by Maurice Cammage after Henry de Gorsse and Nicolas Nancey

Lyricist

- 1900: Un miracle, lyrics by Henry de Gorsse, music by Bertrand de Gorsse, sung by Louise Balthy
- 1903: V'la l'Métro, lyrics by Henry de Gorsse and Adrien Vély
- 1903: Valse d'hier, lyrics by Henry de Gorsse and Maurice Froyez, music by Depret
- 1903: Paris sans fil, lyrics by Henry de Gorsse and Georges Nanteuil, sung by Dranem
