= The Brighton Twins =

1936 French film directed by Claude Heymann

- Directed by: Claude Heymann
- Written by: Robert Bresson; Georges Friedland; Jean Alley
- Based on: The Brighton Twins by Tristan Bernard
- Starring: Raimu; Michel Simon; Suzy Prim
- Cinematography: Paul Cotteret; Louis Née; Armand Thirard
- Edited by: Georges Friedland; Therese Sautereau
- Music by: Roland Manuel
- Production company: Productions Corniglion-Molinier
- Distributed by: Pathé Consortium Cinéma
- Release date: 30 October 1936
- Running time: 89 minutes
- Country: France
- Language: French

The Brighton Twins (French: Les jumeaux de Brighton) is a 1936 French comedy film directed by Claude Heymann and starring Raimu, Michel Simon and Suzy Prim. It is based on the 1908 play of the same title by Tristan Bernard and Robert Bresson worked on the screen adaptation.

== Synopsis ==
Twins are separated at birth in 1890, with one being raised in the United States and the other in France. More than forty years later they encounter each other for the first time.

== Cast ==
- Raimu as Alfred Beaugérard et les deux fils Achille
- Michel Simon as Labrosse
- Suzy Prim as Clémentine Beaugérard
- Charlotte Lysès as Madame Tupin - La belle-mère
- Pierre Finaly as L'avocat
- Marcel Maupi as Le garde du corps
- Jacques Bousquet as L'oncle d'Amérique
- Georges Paulais as Le docteur Paulard
- Mila Parély as Antoinette - La bonne de Nancy
- Pierre Piérade as Le président du tribunal
- Mansuelle as L'huissier
- Lucienne Masset as La nourrice
- Madeleine Milhaud as Madame Achille Beaugérard
- Paul Velsa as Le contrôleur des passeports
- Geneviève Sorya as La poule du garde du corps
- Three Notes Singers as Trio chantant à Brighton
- Jean Tissier as Roberdet
- René Génin as L'encaustiqueur
- Germaine Aussey as Nancy Le Bail
- Émile Genevois as Le gamin
- Albert Malbert as Le barman
- Jane Pierson as La directrice du bureau de placement
- Yvonne Yma as Une dame au tribunal

== Bibliography ==
- Crisp, Colin. Genre, Myth and Convention in the French Cinema, 1929-1939. Indiana University Press, 2002.
