= The Brighton Twins (play) =

1908 French play by Tristan Bernard

The Brighton Twins (French: Les jumeaux de Brighton) is a 1908 play by the French writer Tristan Bernard. It is a farce about twins born in Brighton, who are separated at birth and don't meet again for several decades. It is a loose reworking of the classic play Menaechmi by the Roman writer Plautus.

== Adaptation ==
In 1936 the play was adapted into a film The Brighton Twins starring Raimu.

== Bibliography ==
- S. Douglas Olson. Ancient Comedy and Reception: Essays in Honor of Jeffrey Henderson. Walter de Gruyter, 2014.
