= Méphisto =

1931 film

- Directed by: Henri Debain; Georges Vinter
- Produced by: Les Films Osso
- Starring: Jean Gabin; René Navarre; Janine Ronceray
- Music by: Casimir Oberfeld; Charles L. Pothier
- Release date: 17 April 1931
- Running time: 134 minutes (4 chapters)
- Country: France
- Language: French

Méphisto is the title of a 1931 French film serial co-directed by Henri Debain and Georges Vinter, starring Jean Gabin and René Navarre. It was Gabin's first role in a long and illustrious career, as well as Viviane Elder's first role. The music was by Casimir Oberfeld with lyrics by Charles L. Pothier, sung by Jean Gabin.

== Cast ==
- Jean Gabin as Jacques Miral
- Rene Navarre as Prof. Bergmann
- Janine Ronceray as Hilda Bergmann
- Vivianne Elder as Monique Aubray
- Lucien Callamand as Fortune Bidon
- Andre Marnay as Richard
- Helene Cerpse as La Femme X
- Mathilde Alberti as Madame Palmarede
- Alexandre Mihalesco as Nostradamus
- Paul Clerget as Cornelius
- Fernand Godeau as Eduoard
- France Dhelia as Fanoche
- Milly Mathis as telegraph customer
- Jacques Maury as Willy
- Jean-Marie de L'isle as Le juge d'instruction
- Louis Zellas as Le dogue de Bordeaux
- Tony Dovellani as Le gamin de Ouezzane

== Chapter titles ==
1. La mariée d'un jour
2. Le furet de la tour pointue
3. Les forains mystérieux (The Mysterious Fairgrounds)
4. La revanche de l'amour (The Revenge of Love)
