= Lucien Muhlfeld =

French novelist and dramatic critic

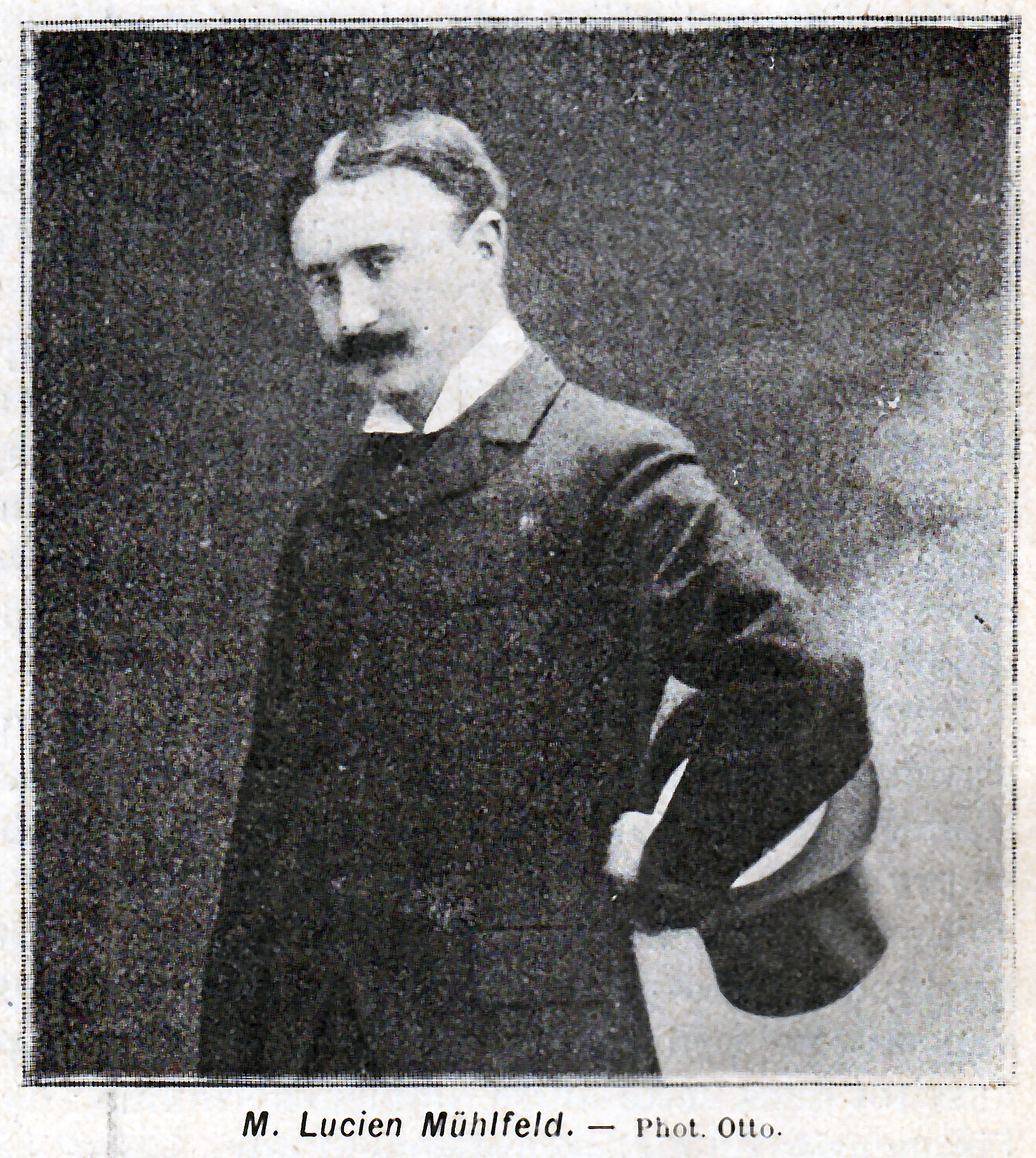
Lucien Muhlfeld

Lucien Muhlfeld (4 August 1870 in Paris – 1 December 1902 in Paris) was a French novelist and dramatic critic.

After completing his studies at the Lycée Condorcet, Muhlfeld entered the University of Paris, where he took the licentiate degrees in literature and law. He then engaged in literary work as a contributor to various periodicals. He became successively dramatic critic for L'Écho de Paris, La Revue Blanche, and the Revue d'Art Dramatique.

From 1890 to 1895 he was assistant librarian at the University of Paris; but he gave up that position to devote himself entirely to literature. He died prematurely of typhoid fever after eating contaminated oysters.

He was the author of Le Mauvais Désir (1890), La Carrière d'André Tourette (1900), and L'Associée (1902)—all three novels dealing with Parisian life.

His two critical works, La Fin d'un art (1890) and Le monde où l'on imprime (1897), never became popular.

He wrote also (with Pierre Veber) a one-act play entitled Dix ans après (produced at the Odéon in 1897).

== Works ==
- Le Mauvais Désir (1890)
- La Carrière d'André Tourette (1900)
- L'Associée (1902)
- La Fin d'un art (1890)
- Le monde où l'on imprime (1897)
- Dix ans après (with Pierre Veber, 1897).
