= Maurice Froyez =

French writer and journalist (1860–1942)

- Born: Alexandre Casimir Maurice Froyez; 15 July 1860; 10th arrondissement of Paris, France
- Died: 1942 (aged 81–82)
- Occupations: Actor, dramatist, journalist
- Spouse: Louise Amélie Chevalier

Alexandre Casimir Maurice Froyez (15 July 1860– 29 July 1942) was a French actor, author and journalist, mostly remembered as show organiser and playwright as well as for his friendly bonds with Edmond Rostand.

== Theatre and shows ==
- À qui la pomme ? revue in 3 acts, with Edmond Rostand and Jules Oudot, 1888
- Les Coulisses de Paris, revue in 3 acts and 5 tableaux, with Jules Oudot, Émile Duret and Henry de Gorsse, Paris, Nouveautés, 26 January 1891
- La Commère apprivoisée, revue in three acts, with Alexandre Michel, Paris, théâtre d'Application, 24 January 1892
- Pour un baiser, comédie lyrique in 1 act, Paris, théâtre d'Application, 26 May 1892
- La Belle Tunisienne, opera in 1 act, with Gaston Lemaire, Étretat, 26 August 1892
- Un baiser en diligence, opéra-comique in one act, Paris, Menus-Plaisirs, 5 December 1893
- Y... T..., rue des Dames, comedy in 3 acts, with Louis Artus, Paris, théâtre Déjazet, 10 February 1894
- Un voyage à Venise, folie-vaudeville in 3 acts, with G. Lainé, Paris, théâtre Déjazet, 21 February 1896
- Une altesse à la mer, fantaisie in 2 acts, with Georges Berr, Paris, Théâtre-Salon, 28 January 1897
- Les Mystères de Montmartre, fantaisie d'actualité, with Jean Mongerolles, Paris, théâtre de la Gaîté-Rochechouart, October 1897
- La Dame de trèfle, operetta in 3 acts, with Charles Clairville, Paris, Bouffes-Parisiens, 13 May 1898
- Le Grand duc Moleskine, fantaisie in 1 act, with Georges Berr, Paris, La Cigale, 11 November 1898
- Enfin, seuls ! ou la Chasteté du vicomte, fantaisie-revue in one act, with Jean Mongerolles, Paris, Théâtre de la Bodinière, 20 December 1898
- C'est demain la première, fantaisie in 1 act, Paris, La Roulotte, 10 February 1899
- Joli Sport, vaudeville in 3 acts, with Paul Dehère, Paris, théâtre Déjazet, 26 April 1899
- Plaisir d'amour, comédie-bouffe in 3 acts, with Georges Berr, Paris, Paris, théâtre de Cluny, 10 October 1899
- Conte de fée, ballet in 1 act, in verses, Paris, théâtre Sarah Bernhardt, 12 June 1901
- La Pucelle de Mexico, fantaisie à grand spectacle, in 2 acts and 8 tableaux, with Henry de Gorsse, Paris, La Cigale, 1 February 1902
- Les Marraines du siècle, féerie à grand spectacle, with Henry de Gorsse, Paris, La Cigale, 8 June 1902
- Second Ménage, comedy in three acts, with André Sylvane, Paris, Odéon, 27 May 1902
- Le Dragon de Pichenette, operetta in 1 act, with Charles Carpentier, Paris, théâtre des Deux-Masques, 30 March 1906
- Dette de femme, comedy in 1 act, Paris, théâtre des Capucines, 14 February 1907
- À quoi tient l'amour ! comedy in 1 act, Paris, Tréteau-Royal, 11 May 1907
- Vive la Parisienne, fantaisie-opérette à grand spectacle in 2 acts and 5 tableaux, Paris, Parisiana, 20 January 1907
- L'Écrasé, comedy in 1 act, Paris, Olympia, 15 September 1909
- Les Yeux qui changent, play in four acts, with Victor Cyril, Paris, théâtre des Arts, 10 April 1910
- The Musical Duke, sketch musical in 1 act, with Joseph Coudurier de Chassaigne, London, London Palladium, 10 June 1912
- Plantons les capucines, revuette, with Dominique Bonnard and Gina Palerme, London, Ambassadors Theatre, 11 May 1914
