= La Revue Blanche =

French art and literary magazine (1889–1903)

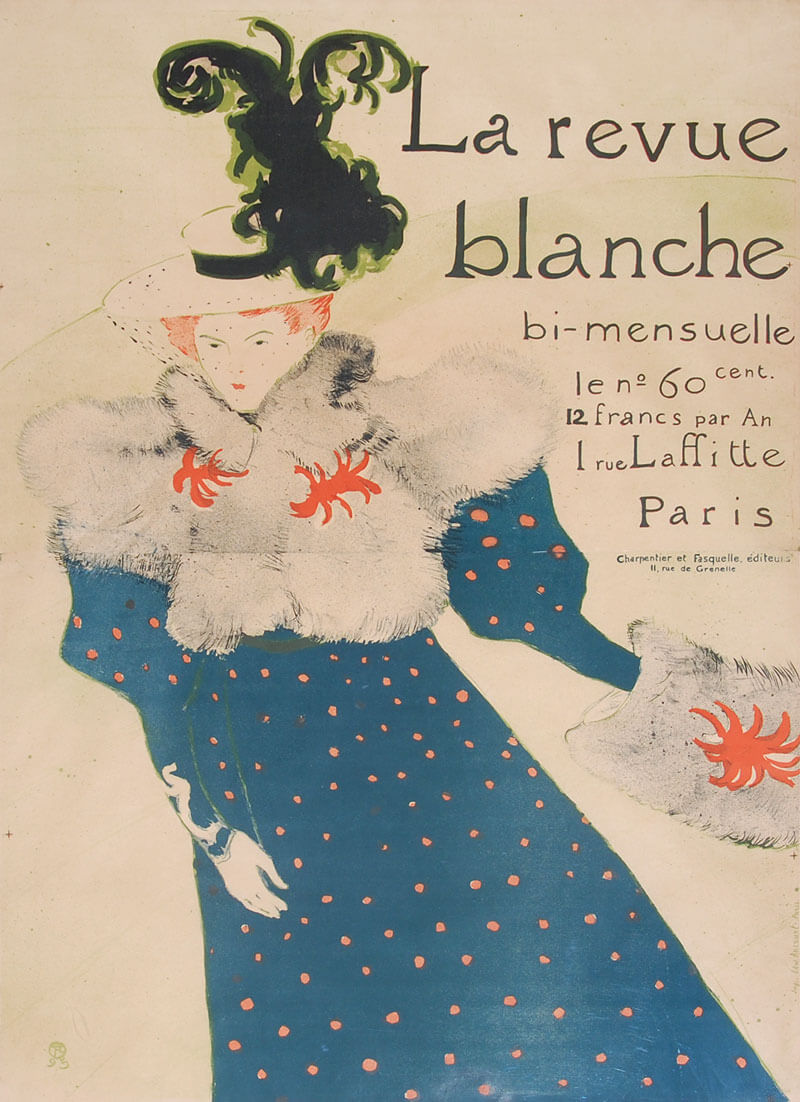
Illustration by Toulouse-Lautrec for La Revue blanche (1895)

La Revue blanche was a French art and literary magazine run between 1889 and 1903. Some of the greatest writers and artists of the time were its collaborators.

== History ==
The Revue blanche was founded in Liège in 1889 and run by the Natanson brothers (Alexander, Thaddeus and Louis-Alfred, a.k.a. "Alfred Athis"). In 1891, the magazine moved to Paris where it rivaled the Mercure de France, hence its name, which served to mark the difference with the Mercure's purple cover. During the early years the magazine was associated with Marcel Proust.

Thaddeus's wife, Misia Sert, participated in the launch of the magazine and served as a model for some covers. The critics Lucien Muhlfeld and Félix Fénéon from 1896 to 1903 served as secretaries, as well as Léon Blum himself.

The journal served as a representative for the cultural and artistic intelligentsia of the time. Starting from 1898, at the instigation of Lucien Herr, it contributed to the Dreyfus affair, siding with the captain accused of treason. During this period the magazine developed close relations with Émile Durkheim.

Octave Mirbeau published his Diary of a Chambermaid in serial form in the Revue blanche in 1900.

The Revue blanche disappeared in 1903 after 237 issues.
