= Jean Veber =

French painter

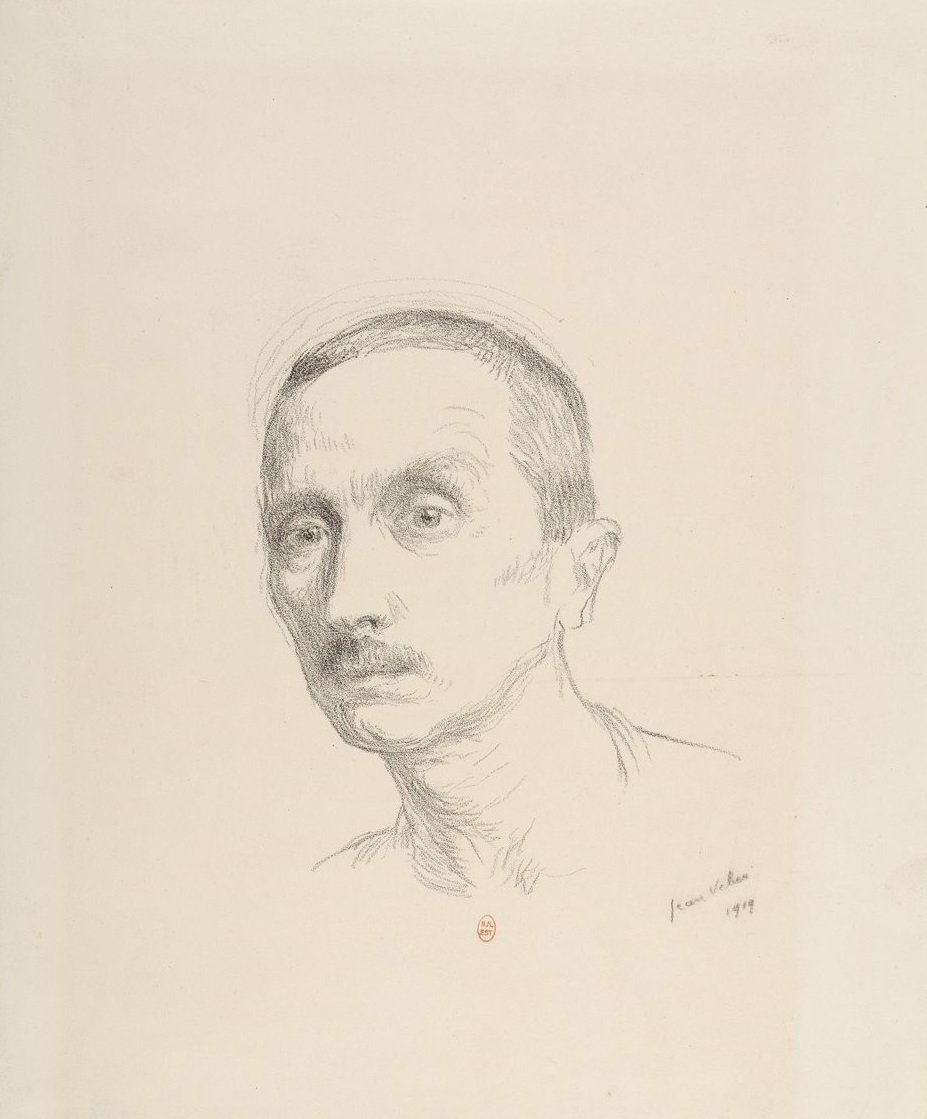
- Self-portrait of Jean Veber
- Born: 13 February 1864; Paris, France
- Died: 28 November 1928 (aged 64); Paris, France
- Known for: Painting, illustrations

Jean Veber (13 February 1864 – 28 November 1928) was a French caricaturist and painter.

== Career overview ==
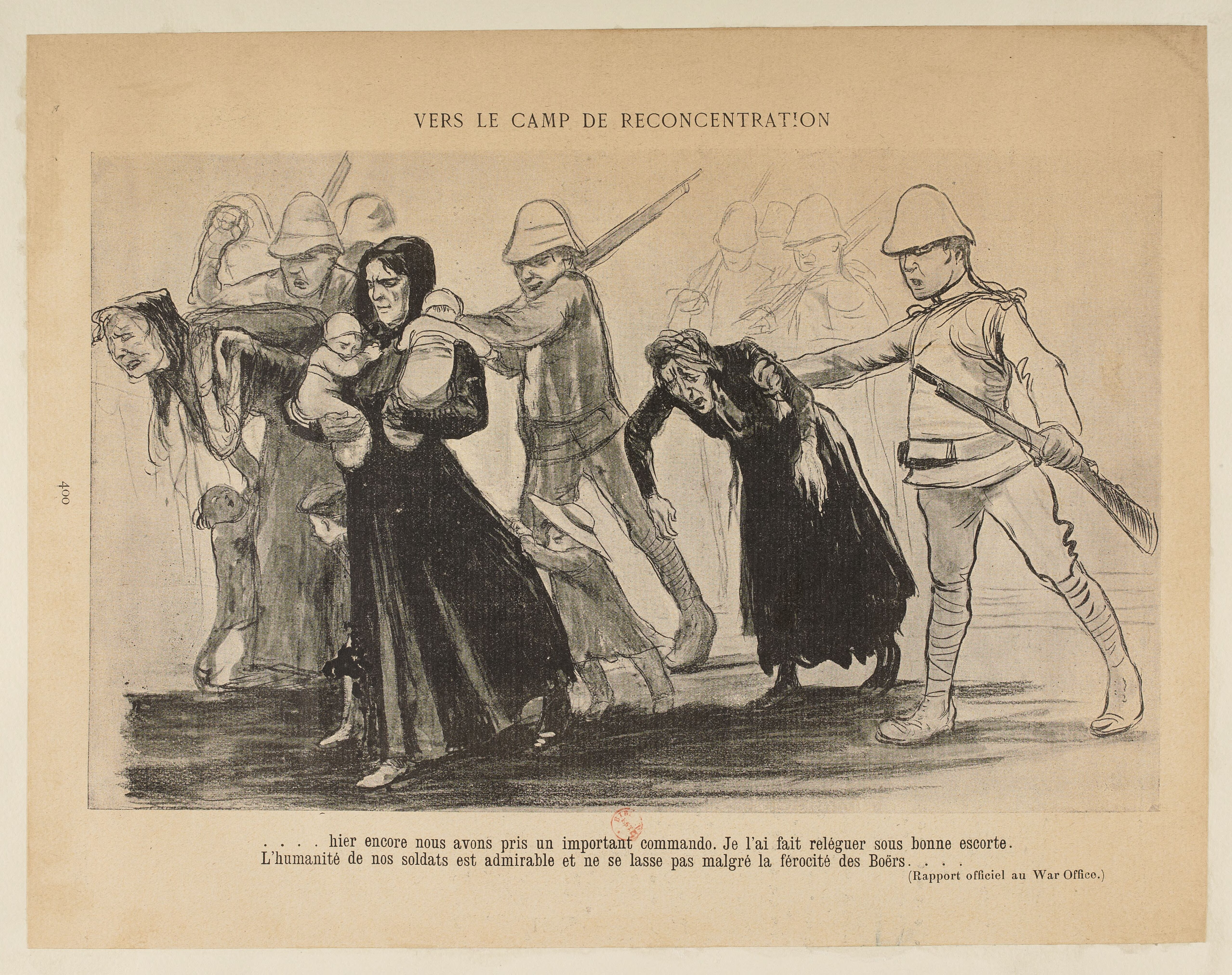
One of Jean Veber's satirical cartoons published in L'Assiette au beurre, denouncing the British concentration camps in South Africa, 1901

Jean Veber was born in Paris in 1864. Trained as a painter, he became an illustrator when his brother Pierre urged him to join the staff of the newspaper Gil Blas. In 1897, his drawing depicting Otto von Bismarck as a butcher of his own people caused a major controversy. Some of his caricatures were also published in L'Assiette au Beurre and Le Rire.

Veber volunteered into service in World War I at fifty years of age. He was intoxicated by poisonous gases and demobilized in the course of 1918.

Jean Veber died in 1928.

== Reputation ==
Jean Veber is quite a peculiar phenomenon which has not yet been deservedly appreciated. On one characteristic ground: because he never understood how to be solemn; because he seems not to take himself or his art seriously. He began as a caricature draughtsman for Boulevard papers, and only when his vocation for this peculiar province was well established, did he exhibit oil-paintings. But he was already labelled, and people continue to regard him merely as a comic draughtsman. The public refuses to allow a double renown to a single talent. [...] Jean Veber is the descendant in the direct line of the younger David Teniers, the Adriaen Brouwers, and the Hollen-Breughels. From them he derives his full style of painting, his deep, rich colours, his great sureness and luxuriance of execution, his clear composition and florid imagination. He differs, however, from them in the quality of his fancy which delights in symbols replete with philosophical references; frequently in Saadic spectacles of cruelty and lust, and very often in lubricities of the Félicien Rops kind. This is the effect of the hundred and fifty to three hundred years which separate him from his more innocent spiritual ancestors.

== Caricatures ==
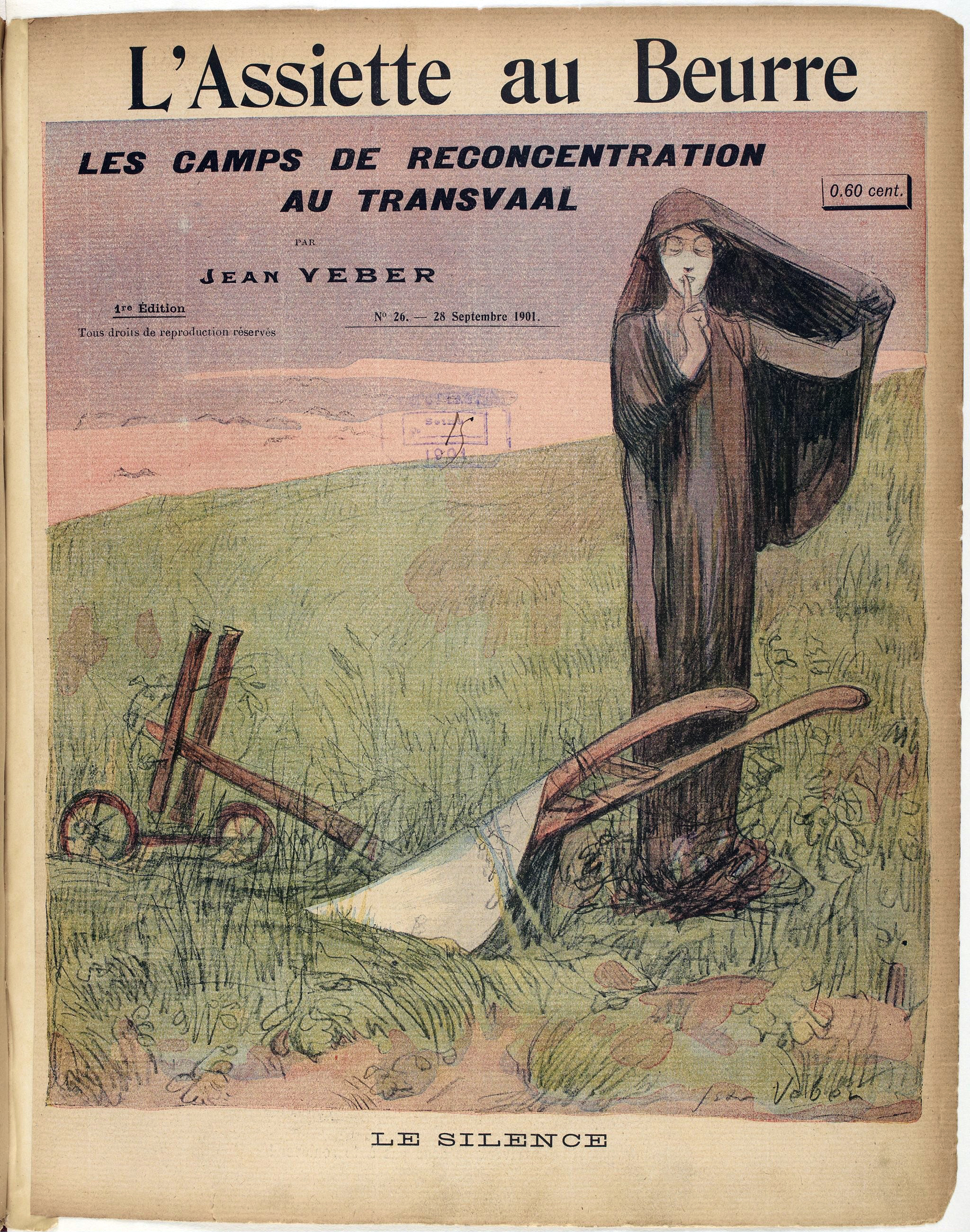
″Les camps de reconcentration au Transvaal″, L'Assiette au beurre, 1901

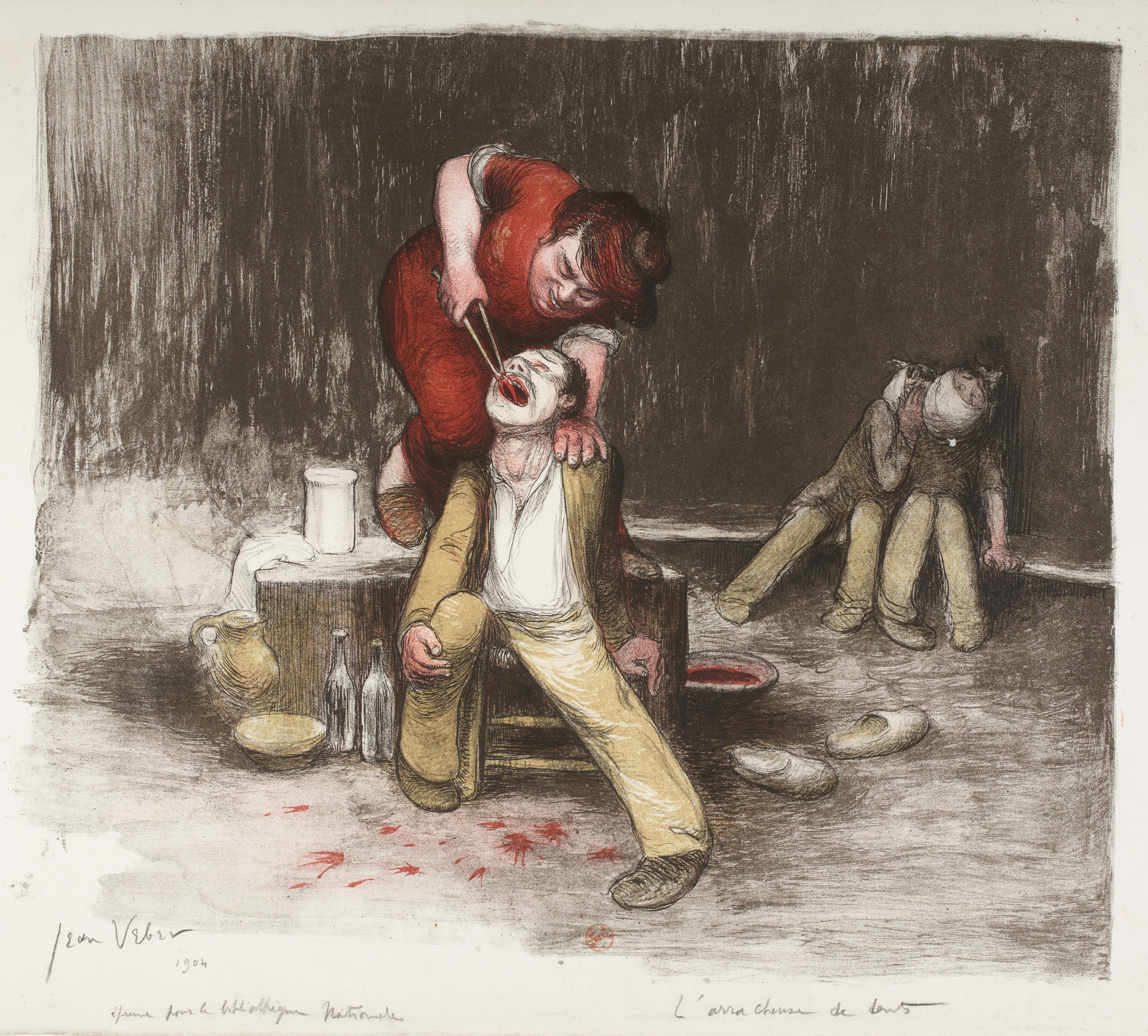
L'arracheuse de dents, 1904

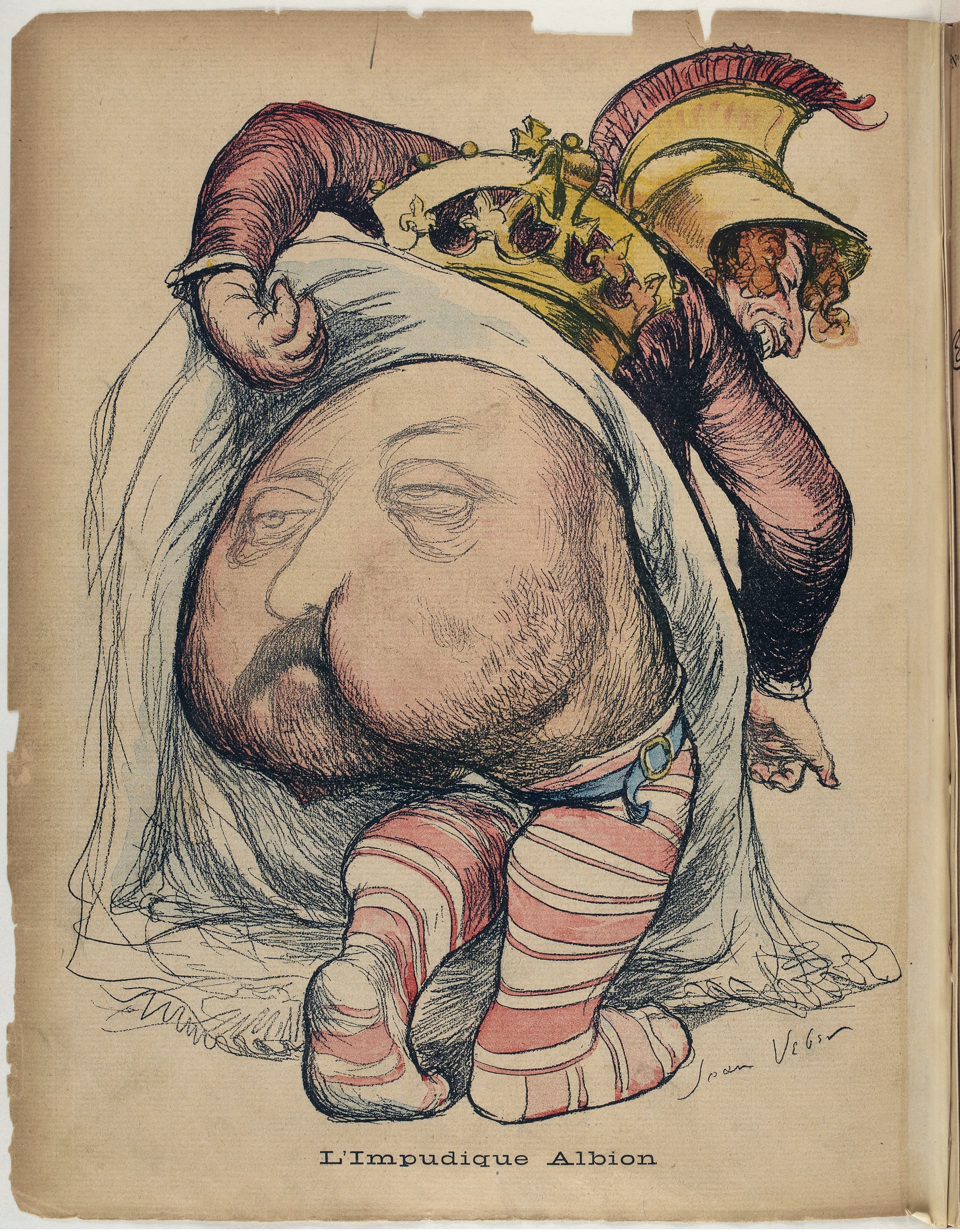
L'impudique Albion

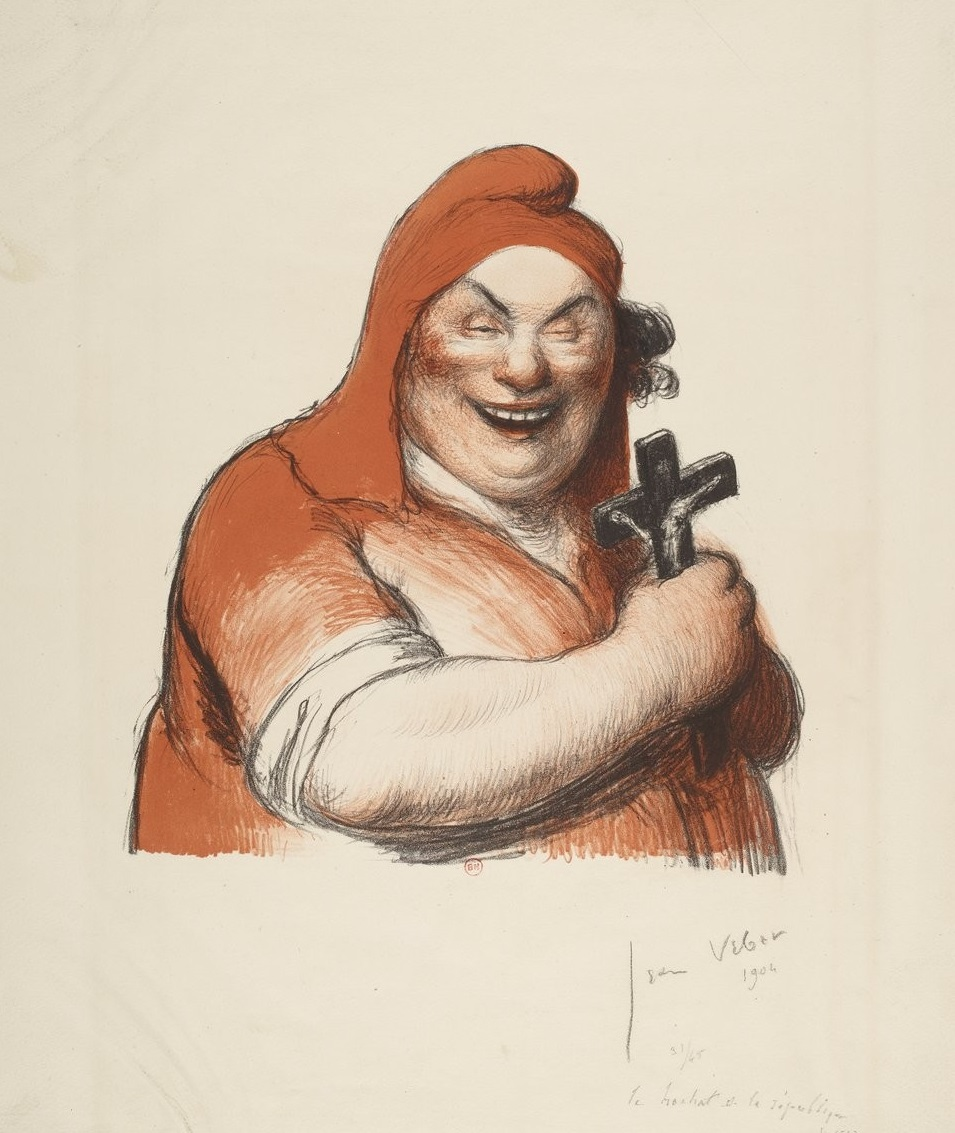
Le hochet de la République, 1904

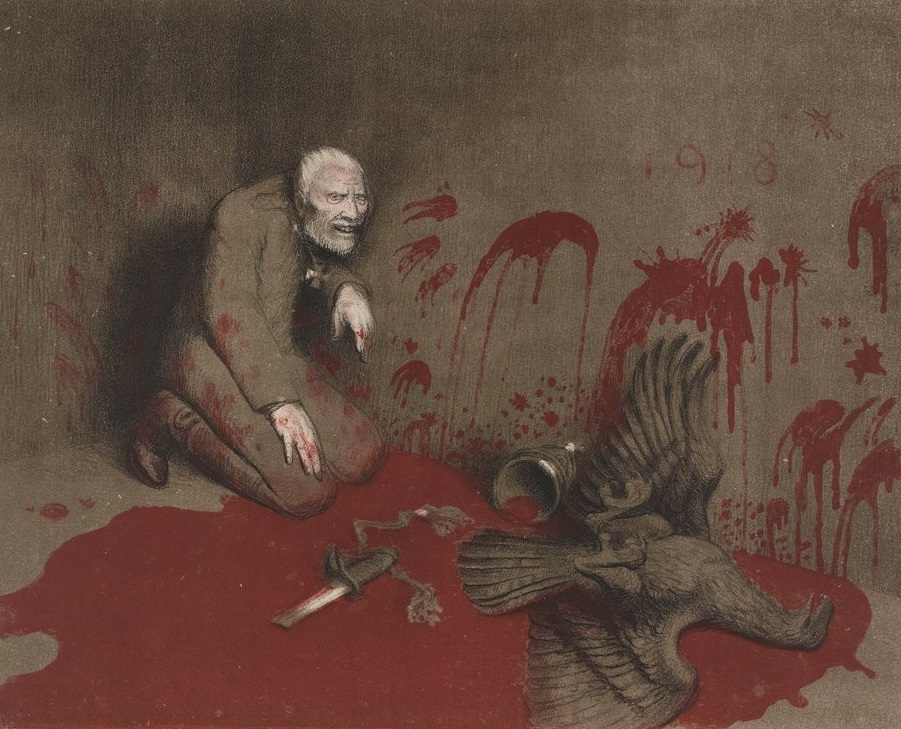
Guillaume II, 1918

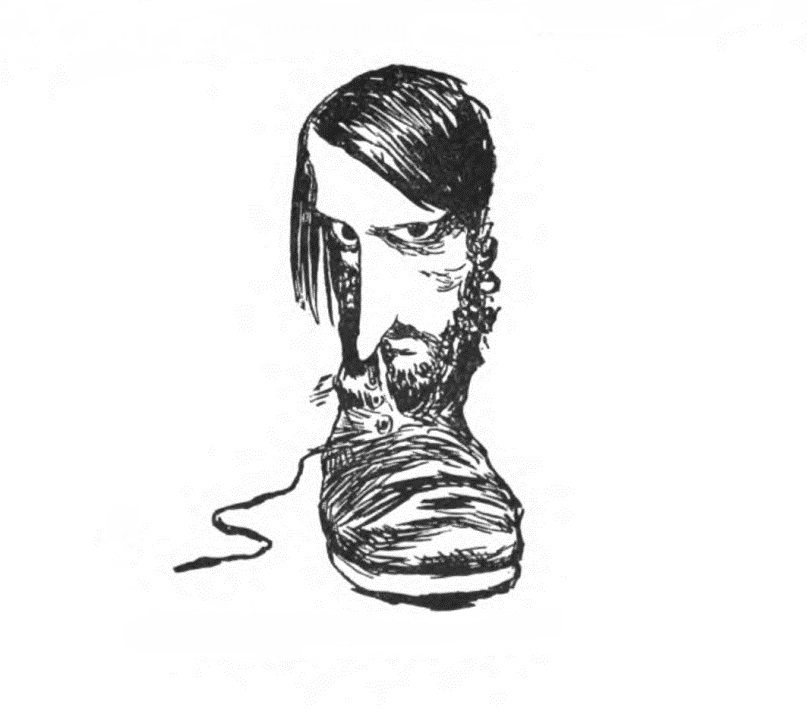
"M. Veber's idea of himself"

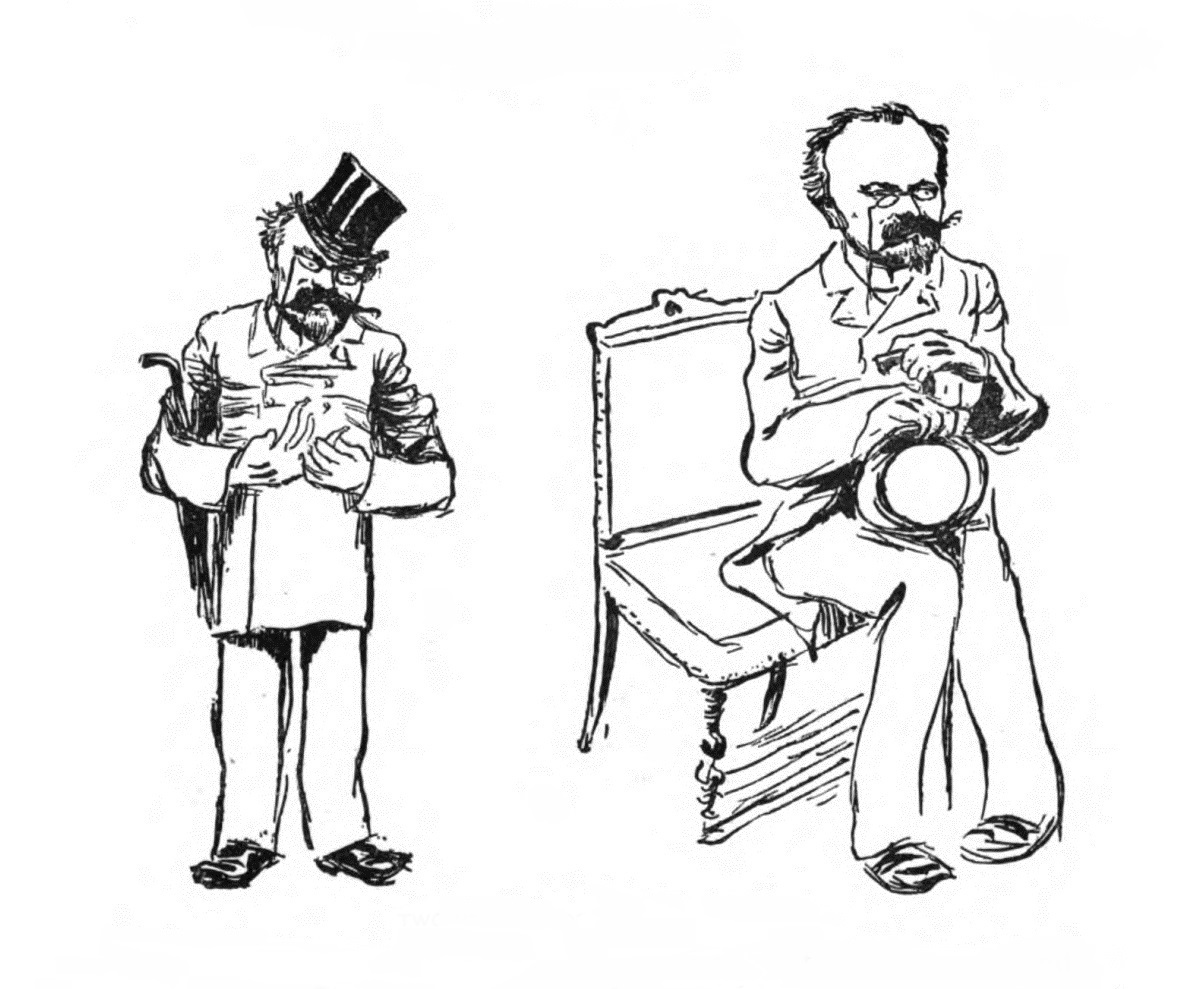
"Two versions of M. Jules Lemaître"

== Portraits ==
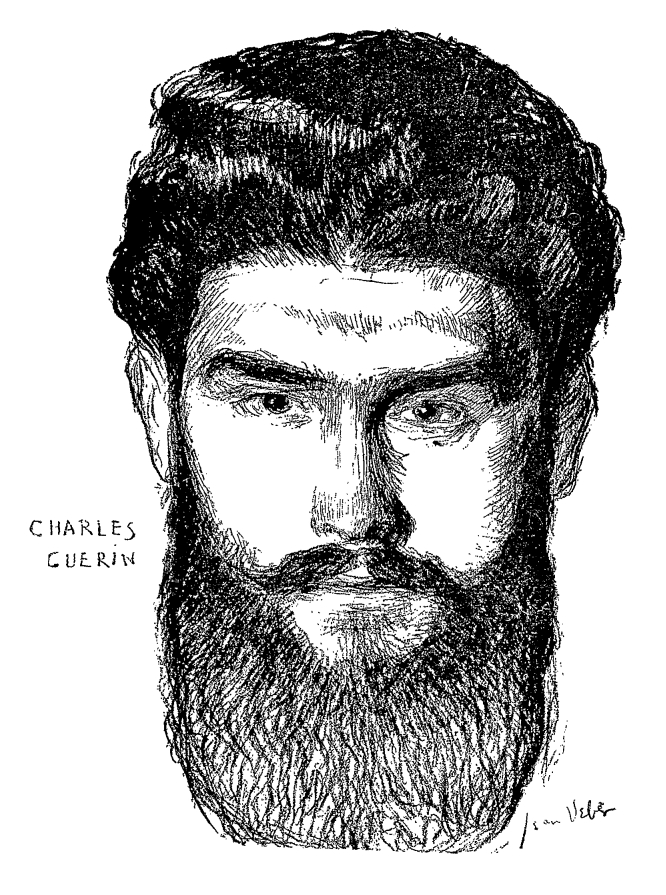
Charles Guérin

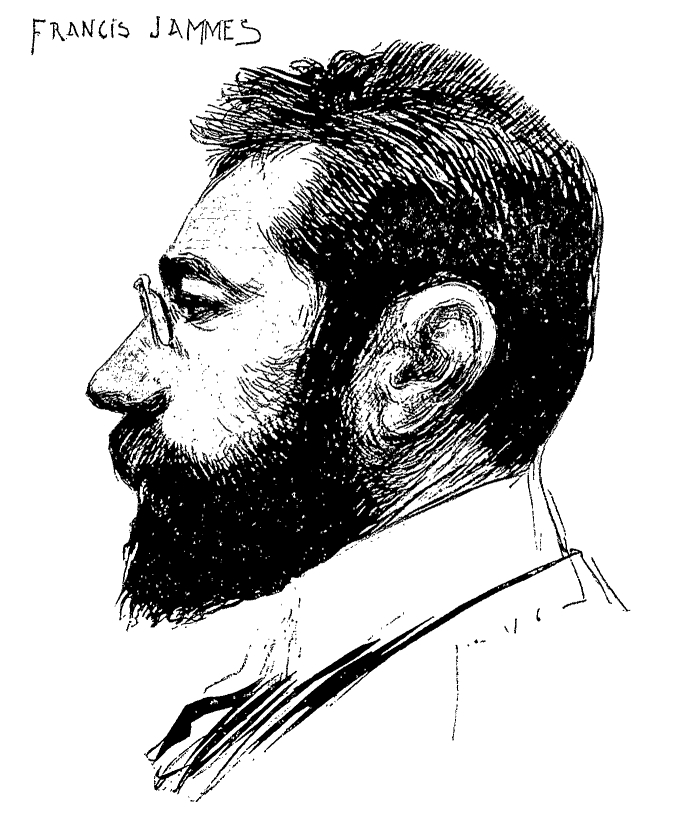
Francis Jammes

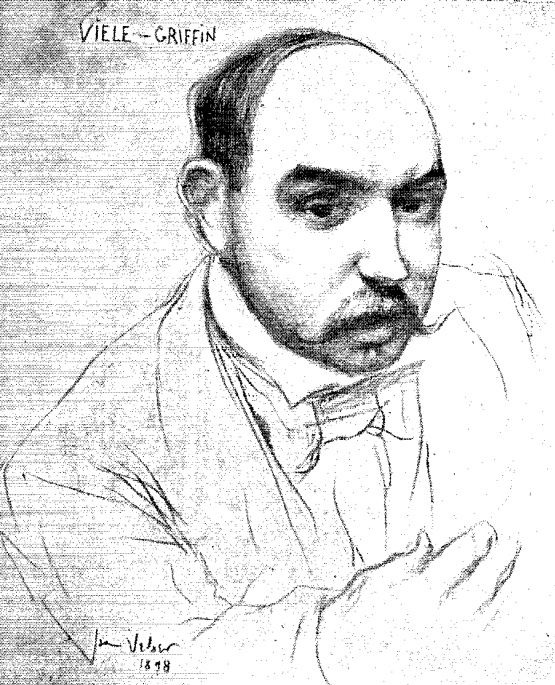
Francis Vielé-Griffin

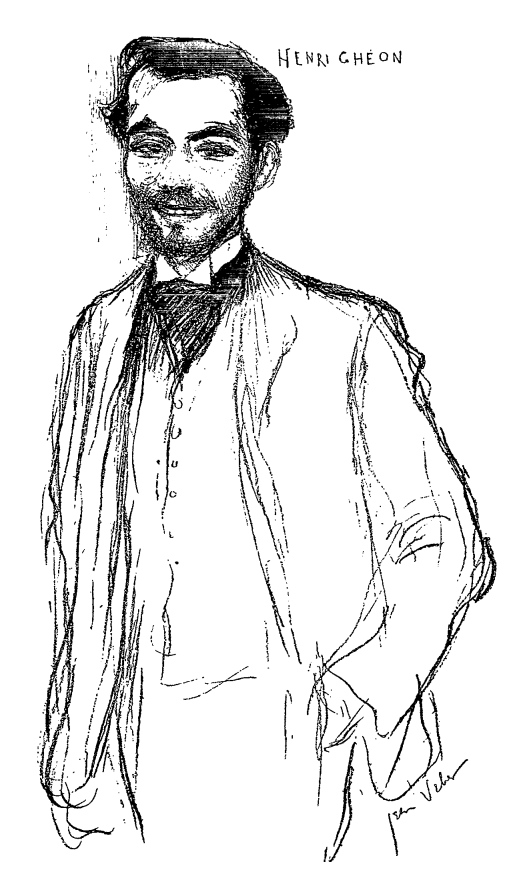
Henri Ghéon

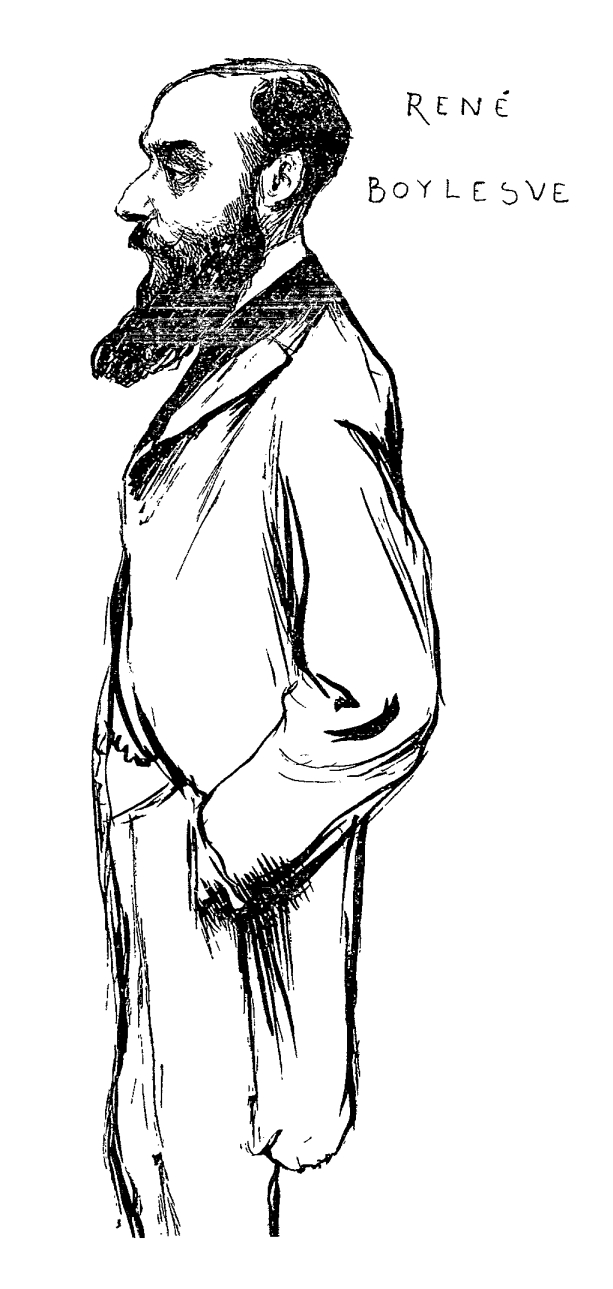
René Boylesve

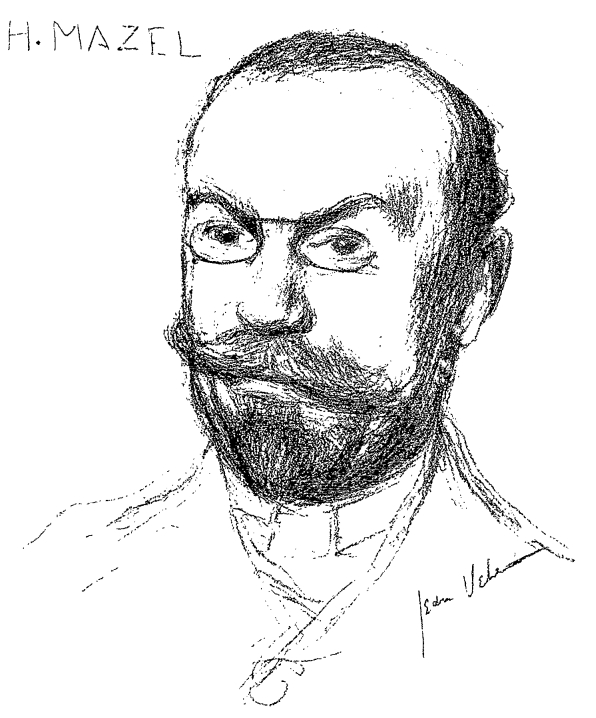
Henri Mazel

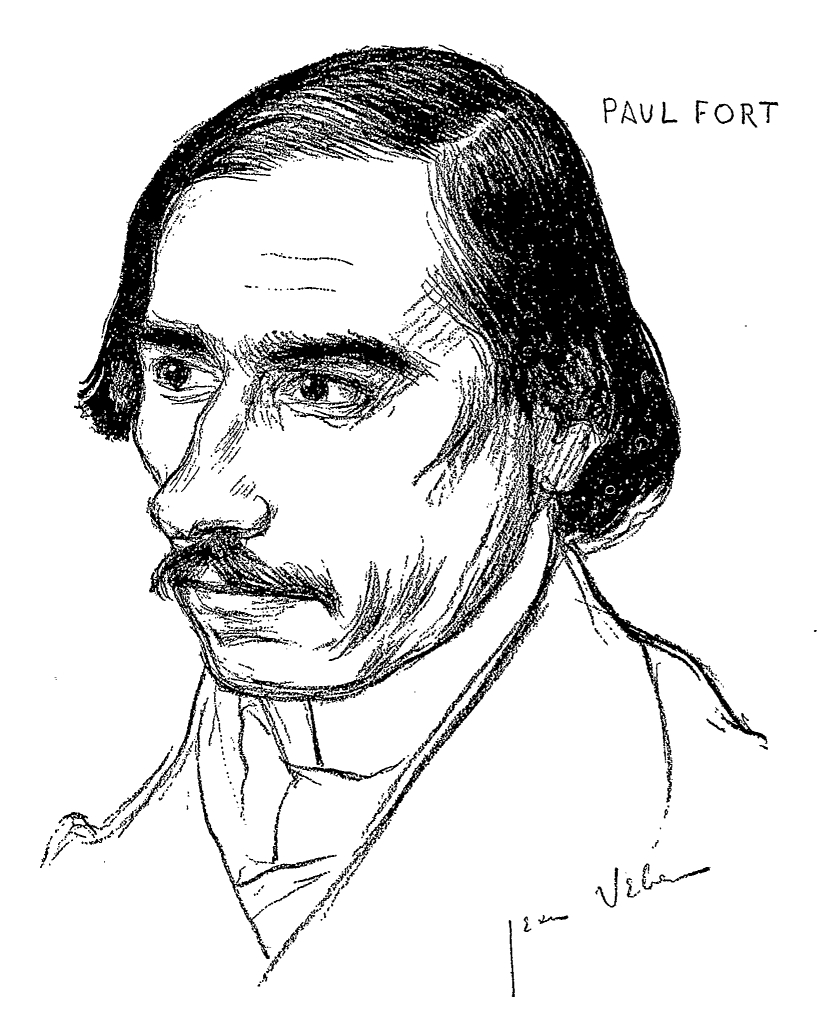
Paul Fort

== Paintings ==
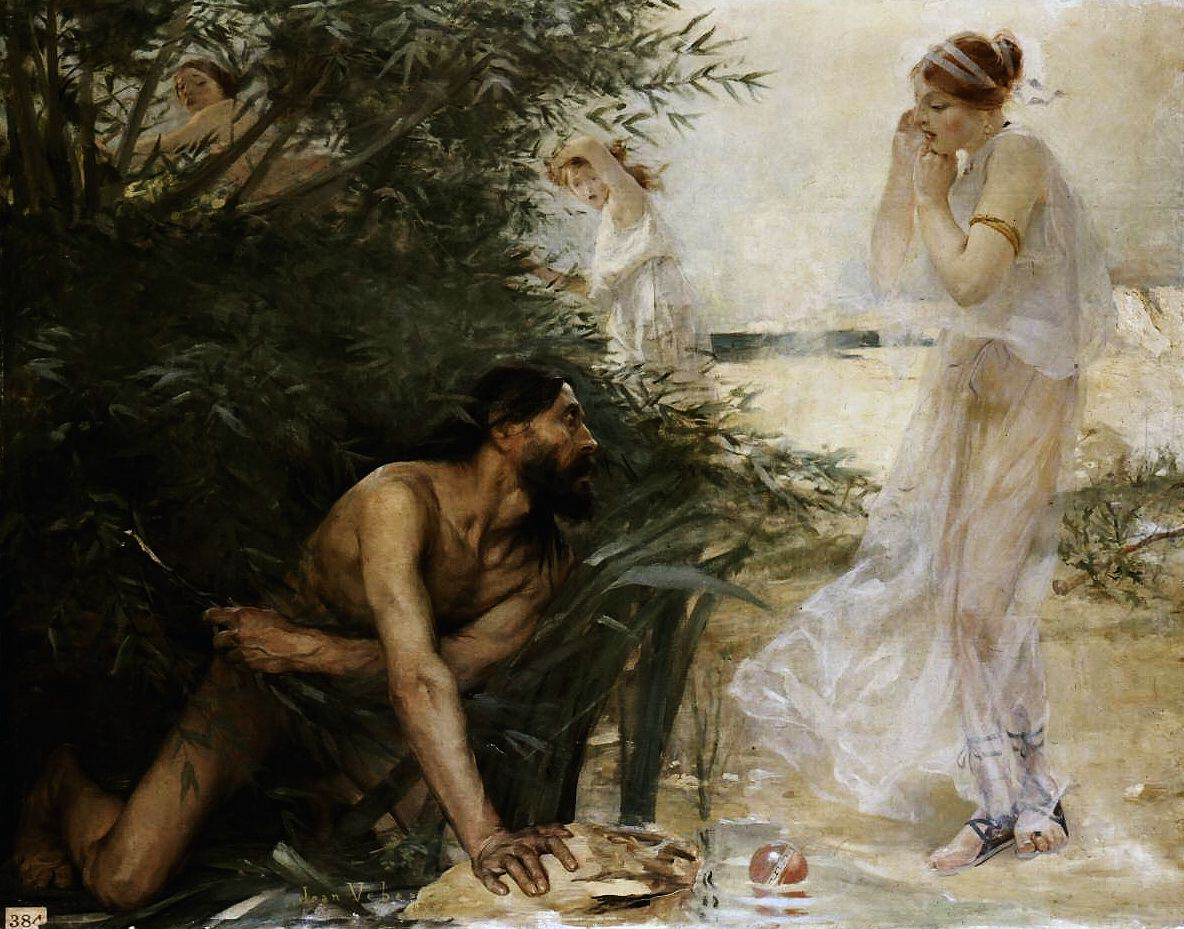
Ulysses and Nausicaa, 1888
