= Henri Debain =

French actor (1886–1983)

Henri Debain (3 August 1886 – 15 January 1983) was a French film actor.

He first appeared in Le Petit café in 1919, and appeared in more than 25 films between 1919 and 1956. He directed three films including Mephisto in 1931.

== Filmography ==
=== As director ===
- 1927 : Chantage
- 1928 : Hara-Kiri, achevé par Marie-Louise Iribe
- 1930 : Méphisto

=== As actor ===
- Châtelaine du Liban, La (1956) .... Un Invité
- Mon curé chez les pauvres (1956)
- Private Life (1942) .... Le dialoguiste
- Itto (1934) .... Le sergent
- La Maternelle, La (1933) .... Dr. Libois
- Le Béguin de la garnison, Le (1932) .... Le colonel
- La dame de chez Maxim's (1933) .... Etienne
- Gisèle and Partner (1932)
- Léon tout court (1932) .... Le speaker
- Maruche (1932) .... Pinchot
- The Foreigner (1931) .... Mister Clarkson
- Aiglon, L' (1931) .... Le sergent
- Monte Cristo (1929) .... Carderousse
- J'ai l'noir ou Le suicide de Dranem (1928)
- Marquitta (1927)
- Michel Strogoff (1926) .... Harry Blount
- Mots croisés (1926)
- Amour et carburateur (1925)
- A Son from America (1924)
- Les Grands (1924)
- Le Costaud des Épinettes (1923)
- Triplepatte (1922)
- La Maison vide (1921)
- Le Secret de Rosette Lambert (1920)
- The Little Cafe (1919)
