= The Little Cafe (play) =

Play written by Tristan Bernard

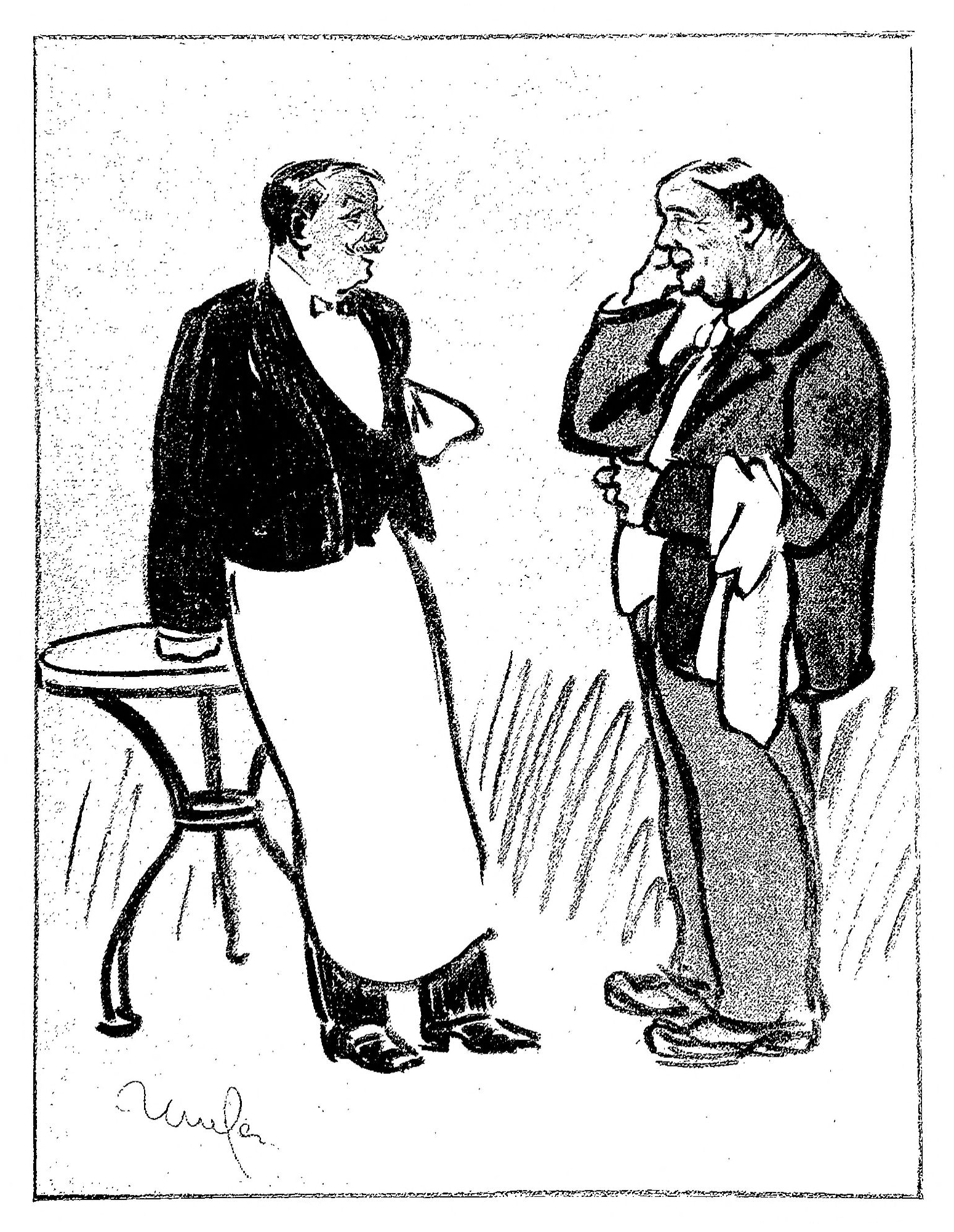
Le Petit Café: Messrs Le Gallo and Germain at Paris' Théâtre du Palais-Royal in 1911. Illustration by Raymond Renefer.

The Little Cafe (French: Le petit café) is a French comedy play written by Tristan Bernard which was first performed in 1911. An English-language musical version The Little Cafe was successfully staged in the United States in 1913.

== Synopsis ==
Albert Loriflan, a waiter in a Paris cafe, unexpectedly inherits a large sum of money from a wealthy relative. His unscrupulous boss, Philibert, refuses to release him from his long-term contract in the hope that Albert will buy him off with a large payment. But Albert refuses, and continues to work at the cafe even though he is now very rich. Before long he falls in love with Philibert's daughter Yvonne.

== Film adaptations ==
In 1919 the play was turned into a French silent film The Little Cafe directed by Tristan Bernard's son Raymond Bernard. In 1930 Paramount Pictures made an American adaptation Playboy of Paris directed by Ludwig Berger and starring Maurice Chevalier. Paramount also produced a French-language version, Le Petit Café (1931), again starring Chevalier.

In the 1960s, the play was turned into an Italian television film (1963) and a later Yugoslavian version (1967).

== Bibliography ==
- Bordman, Gerald. American Musical Theatre: A Chronicle. Oxford University Press, 2010.
- Bradley, Edwin M. The First Hollywood Musicals: A Critical Filmography Of 171 Features, 1927 Through 1932. McFarland, 2004.
