= Tristan Bernard =

French playwright (1866–1947)

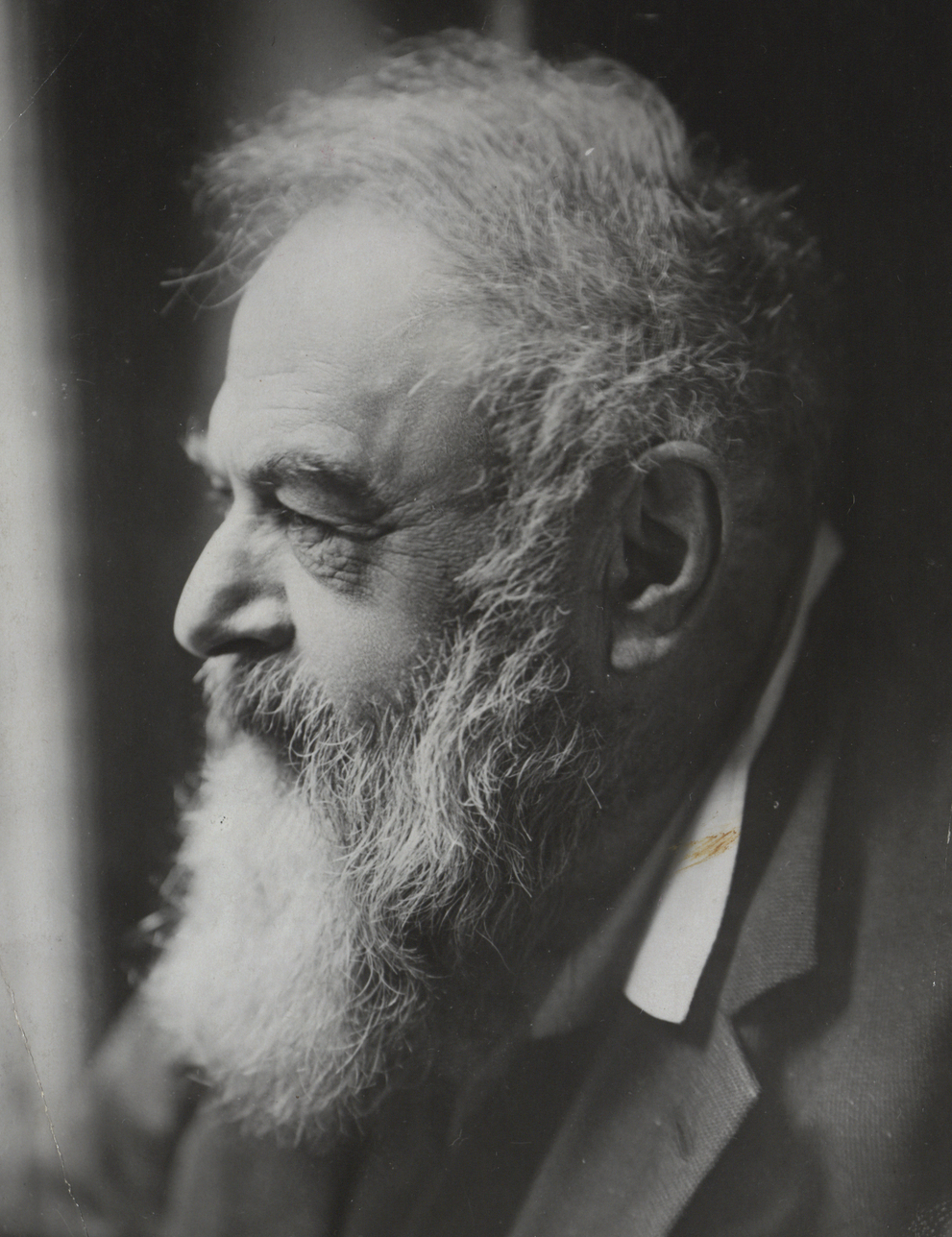
Tristan Bernard,

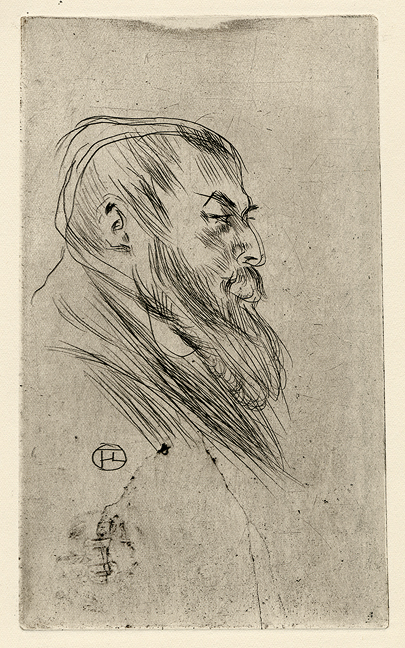
Tristan Bernard, drawn by Toulouse-Lautrec

Tristan Bernard (7 September 1866 – 7 December 1947) was a French playwright, novelist, journalist and humorist.

== Life ==
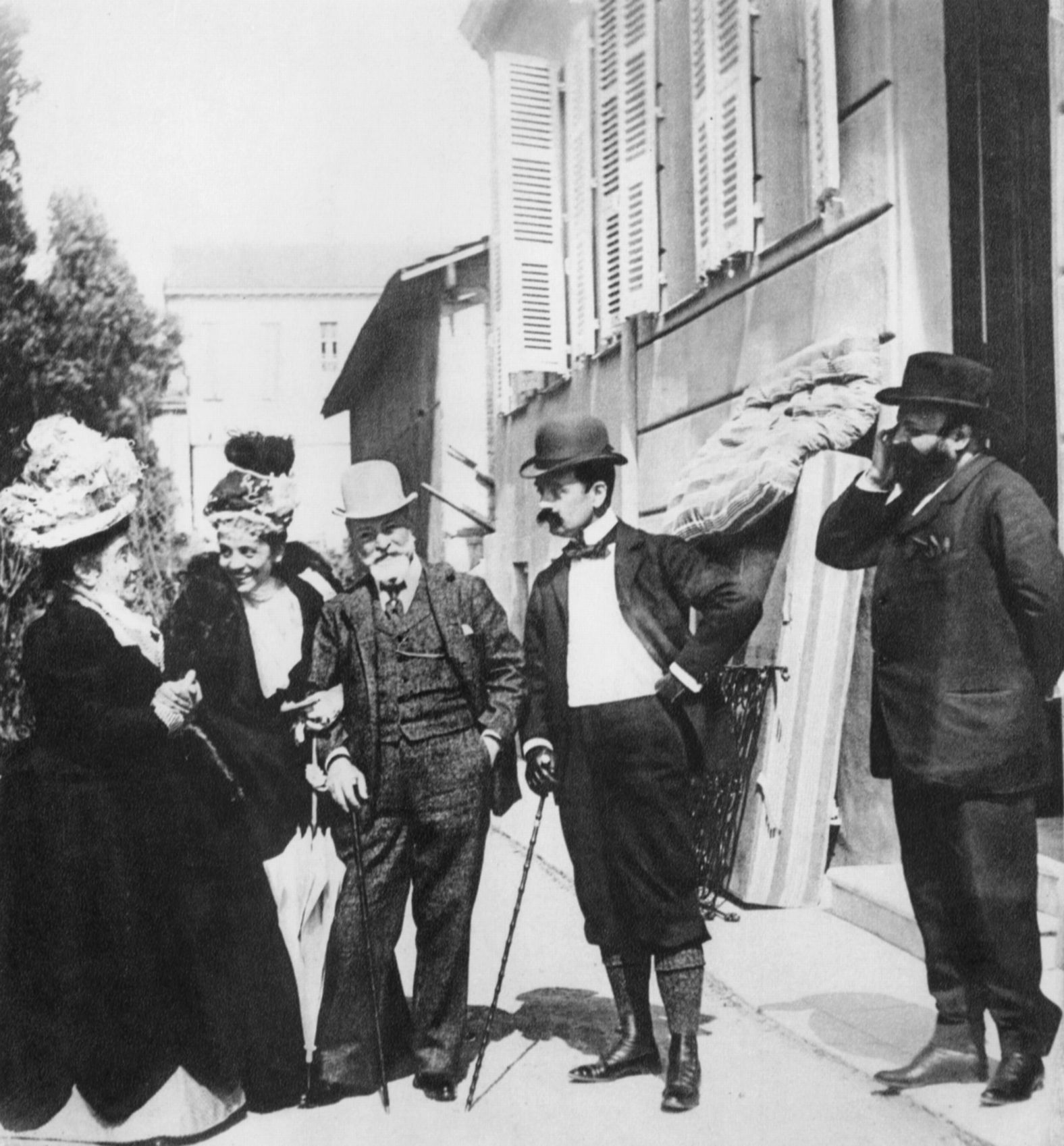
Tristan Bernard with Eleonora Duse, Matilde Serao, and others, 1897. Photo by Giuseppe Primoli.

He studied law, and after his military service, he started his career as the manager of an aluminium smelter. In the 1890s, he managed the Vélodrome de la Seine at Levallois-Perret and the Vélodrome Buffalo, events that were an integral part of Parisian life, being regularly attended by personalities such as Toulouse-Lautrec. He reputedly introduced the bell to signify the last lap of a race.

He identified as an anarchist.

During the Occupation Bernard was arrested in the South of France in September 1943 because he was Jewish, and sent to the Drancy camp. Thanks to the efforts of his friends Sacha Guitry and Arletty he was released a few weeks later.

Famous for his wit, Bernard was also a crossword creator.

== Works ==
=== Plays ===
- Les Pieds nickelés (1895)
- L'Anglais tel qu'on le parle (French Without a Master) (1899)
- Triplepatte (with André Godfernaux, 1905)
- The Brighton Twins (Les Jumeaux de Brighton) (1908)
- Le Danseur inconnu (1909)
- Le Costaud des épinettes (with Alfred Athis, 1910)
- The Little Cafe (Le petit café) (1911)
- Les Deux Canards (with Alfred Athis, 1913)
- Jeanne Doré (1913)
- Coeur de lilas (with Charles-Henry Hirsch, 1921)
- Le Cordon bleu (1923)
- Embrassez-moi (with Gustave Quinson and Yves Mirande, 1923)

=== Narrative works ===
- Vous m'en direz tant (1894) collaboration with Pierre Veber
- Contes de Pantruche et d'ailleurs (1897)
- Sous toutes réserves (1898)
- Mémoires d'un jeune homme rangé (1899)
- Un mari pacifique (1901)
- Amants et voleurs (1905)
- Mathilde et ses mitaines (1912)
- L'Affaire Larcier (1924)
- Le Voyage imprévu (1928)
- Aux abois (1933)
- Robin des bois (1935)

=== Essays ===
- Preface to Paul et Virginie by Bernardin de Saint-Pierre, George Crès et Cie, Paris (1920)

== Filmography ==
- Jeanne Doré, directed by Louis Mercanton and René Hervil (1915, based on the play Jeanne Doré)
- The Love Cheat, directed by George Archainbaud (1919, based on the play Le Danseur inconnu)
- The Little Cafe, directed by Raymond Bernard (1919, based on the play The Little Cafe)
- Triplepatte, directed by Raymond Bernard (1922, based on the play Triplepatte)
- Le Costaud des épinettes, directed by Raymond Bernard (1923, based on the play Le Costaud des épinettes)
- Kiss Me, directed by Robert Péguy (1929, based on the play Embrassez-moi)
- The Unknown Dancer, directed by René Barberis (1929, based on the play Le Danseur inconnu)
- Playboy of Paris, directed by Ludwig Berger (1930, based on the play The Little Cafe)
  - The Little Cafe, directed by Ludwig Berger (1931, based on the play The Little Cafe)
- Le Poignard malais, directed by Roger Goupillières (1931, based on a short story)
- English As It Is Spoken, directed by Robert Boudrioz (1931, based on the play L'Anglais tel qu'on le parle)
- The Champion Cook, directed by Karl Anton (1932, based on the play Le Cordon bleu)
- Coeur de lilas, directed by Anatole Litvak (1932, based on the play Coeur de lilas)
- Kiss Me, directed by Léon Mathot (1932, based on the play Embrassez-moi)
- Les Deux Canards, directed by Erich Schmidt (1934, based on the play Les Deux Canards)
- The Slipper Episode, directed by Jean de Limur (1935, based on the novel Le Voyage imprévu)
  - Runaway Ladies, directed by Jean de Limur (1938, based on the novel Le Voyage imprévu)
- Lovers and Thieves, directed by Raymond Bernard (1935, based on the play Le Costaud des épinettes)
- The Brighton Twins, directed by Claude Heymann (1936, based on the play The Brighton Twins)
- Jeanne Doré, directed by Mario Bonnard (Italy, 1938, based on the play Jeanne Doré)
- The Last Metro, directed by Maurice de Canonge (1945, based on the novel Mathilde et ses mitaines)
- Aux abois, directed by Philippe Collin (2005, based on the novel Aux abois)

=== Screenwriter ===
- Le Ravin sans fond (dir. Jacques Feyder and Raymond Bernard, 1917)
- L'Homme inusable (dir. Raymond Bernard, 1923)
- Décadence et grandeur (dir. Raymond Bernard, 1923)
- The Fortune (dir. Jean Hémard, 1931)
- Eusèbe député (dir. André Berthomieu, 1938)
- Girls in Distress (dir. G. W. Pabst, 1939)
