= Léon Xanrof =

French playwright and songwriter

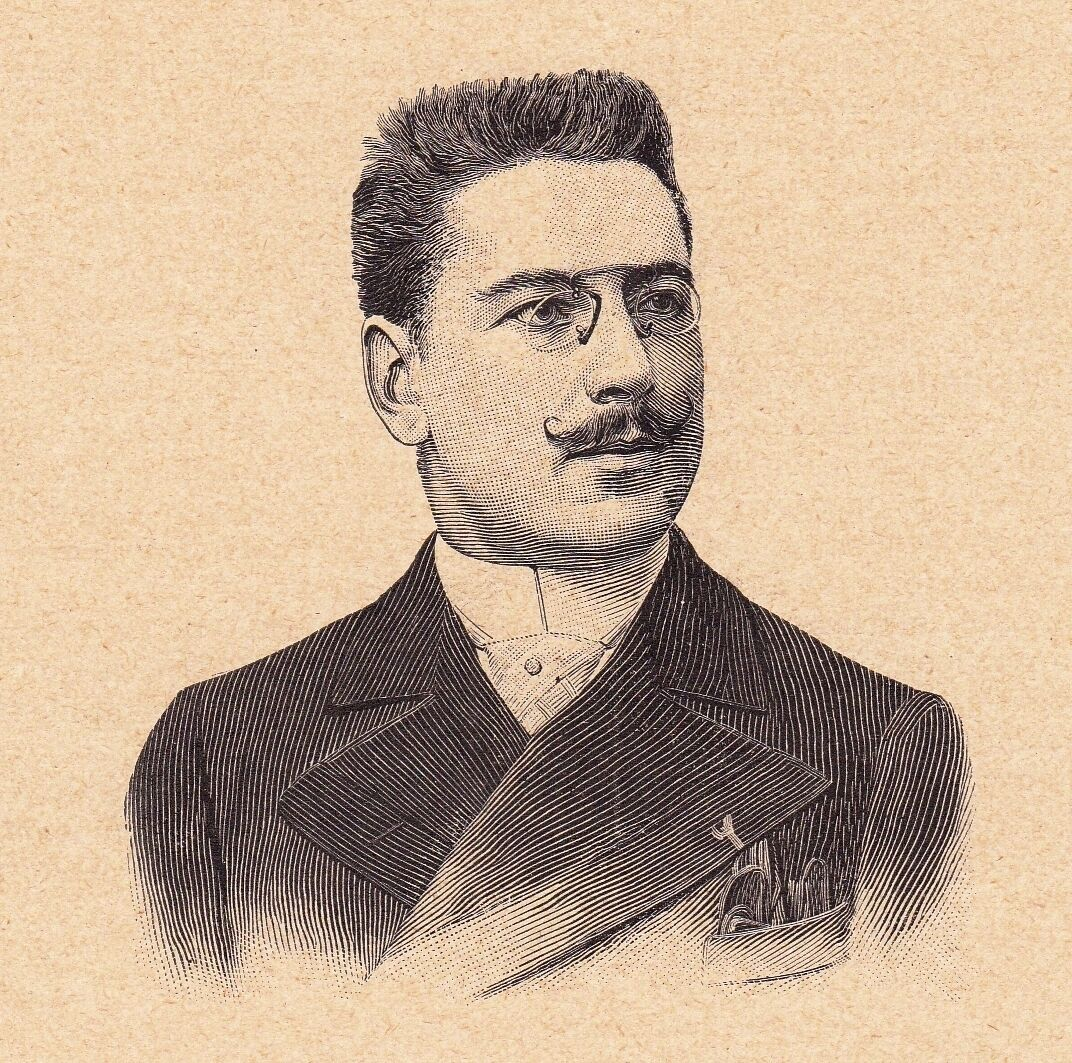
Léon Xanrof

Léon Alfred Fourneau (9 December 1867, in Paris – 17 May 1953, in Paris) was a French humourist, music-hall artist, playwright and songwriter. Originally trained as a lawyer he invented the stage- and pen name Xanrof by inversion of the Latin fornax of his French surname fourneau ("furnace"), before finally legally changing his name to Léon Xanrof. Yvette Guilbert experienced early success singing Xanrof's songs at Rodolphe Salis' cabaret Le Chat Noir.

Born in an bourgeois upper middle class environment, with his father a wealthy physician, young Leon Fourneau was inclined to a literary and poetry career, but his family insisted on him graduating (Baccalauréat) and taking up further éducation (he obediently undertook successful law studies and registered at the paris bar, aged 23), but he still felt inclined to song and opérette writing. The Xanrof alias was a measure of appeasement towards his family and the bar authorities as Léon Fourneau kept writing and publishing songs for cabaret singers.

A bizarre incident then occurred: As he was crossing the bustling rue Lepic (Lower Montmartre)he was almost run down by a closed winter Fiacre (French Hansom cab with a closed body). The reason for the cab driver being neglectful was both salacious and funny: as Leon Fourneau was dusting himself, he saw one of the cab's blinds briefly lifted and got a glimpse of a half-naked couple gazing at him. The cab-ride was what was termed a "course d'alcôve" (lovebed-ride), a not unfrequent instance in "belle époque" Paris where illegitimate couples enjoyed "comprehensive flirtation" in the intimacy of a cab (at least two short humoristic tales by Alphonse Allais harp on this particular theme).

Leon Fourneau quickly wrote a witty and somewhat racy song called Le Fiacre, he was paid 50 gold francs for it and the song was inserted in a comic intermede in an operette called "Les Mohicans de Paris" adapted from a novel by Alexandre Dumas about Paris underworld.

In this song a cuckolded old man walking in a Parisian street hears kisses, moans, and his wife's voice coming from inside a suspiciously rolling and pitching cab. He rushes forward, trips on the slippery wooden paved road ad is squashed to death by the cab. The lady then opens the door and rejoices, telling her lover that they do not need hiding any more. She then urges her lover to pay the princely tip of one hundred sous (five gold francs) to the cab driver.

The song then rocketed to French and international success when it was sung by the then-beginner Yvette Guilbert.

Yvette Guilbert's career as a singer was definitely launched and most of her best-remembered songs where written by Léon Fourneau who undertook official action to have his pen name duly registered as his official surname. In time he would resign from the bar, taking up full time operette and song writing work and being elected at the SACEM board (SACEM stands for Société des Auteurs et Compositeurs de Musique and is the mutual organisation in charge of music author's rights).

== Works ==
Songs

- À présent qu'on n'est plus ensemble, dittie, lyrics by Léon Xanrof, music by E. Jaquinot.
- Rive gauche, chansons d'étudiants (1888)
- Chansons sans-gène (1890)
- Chansons parisiennes, répertoire du Chat noir (1890-1891)
- Chansons à Madame (1891)
- Pochards et pochades, histoires du Quartier Latin (1891)
- Chansons à rire (1892)
- L'Anarchiste, lyrics and music by Léon Xanrof. P. Dupont, (1892).
- L'Amour et la vie, nouvelles (1894)
- Lettres ouvertes (1894)
- Bébé qui chante (1894)
- Chansons ironiques (1895)
- La Forme ! la fô.. ô.. orme ! (1897)
- Juju, recueil de nouvelles et de saynètes (1897)
- L'Œil du voisin, recueil de contes (1897)
- De l'autel à l'hôtel (1902)
- Une et un font trois (1903)
- C'est pour rire (1911)
- Le Mécanique de l'Esprit (1931)
- Chacun treize à la douzaine (1933)

Theatre

- 1888: Chez le peintre, farce d'atelier in 1 act, with M. Bernac, Paris, Théâtre d'Application, 8 March
- 1896: Ohé, l'amour ! revue in 2 tableaux, with Cellarius, Paris, Scala, 18 April
- 1897: Madame Putiphar, three-act operetta, with Ernest Depré, music byEdmond Diet, Paris, Théâtre de l'Athénée, 27 February
- 1901: Pour être aimée, three-act comedy, with Michel Carré, Paris, Théâtre de l'Athénée, 27 February
- 1903: The Prince Consort, three-act comedy, with Jules Chancel, Théâtre de l'Athénée, 25 November, which was used to create the 1929 film Parade d'amour (The Love Parade).
- 1905: Son premier voyage, comedy in 1 act and 2 tableaux, Paris, Théâtre des Deux Masques, 5 November
- 1906: En douceur, one-act comedy, with Pierre Veber, Paris, Théâtre des Mathurins, 23 October
- 1908: Un coup de foudre, three-act vaudeville, Paris, Théâtre des Folies-Dramatiques, 16 April
- 1908: S.A.R. (Son Altesse royale), three-act musical comedy, with Jules Chancel, music by Ivan Caryll, Paris, Théâtre des Bouffes-Parisiens, 11 November
- 1910: Rève de valse, three-act operetta, adaptation by Léon Xanrof and Jules Chancel, after Felix Dörmann et Leopold Jacobson, music by Oscar Straus, Paris, Théâtre de l'Apollo
- 1911: Les Petites étoiles, three-act operetta, with Pierre Veber, music by Henri Hirchmann, Paris, Théâtre Apollo, 23 December

Cinema

- 1911: La Fête de Marguerite, script by Léon Xanrof, Pathé frères
