= A Son from America (1925 film) =

1925 film directed by Henri Fescourt

- Directed by: Henri Fescourt
- Written by: Pierre Veber (play); Marcel Gerbidon (play)
- Starring: Gabriel Gabrio; Henri Debain; Alice Tissot
- Release date: 1925
- Country: France
- Languages: Silent; French intertitles

A Son from America (French: Un fils d'Amérique) is a 1925 French silent comedy film directed by Henri Fescourt and starring Gabriel Gabrio, Henri Debain and Alice Tissot. It was remade as a sound film of the same title.

== Cast ==
- Gabriel Gabrio as Léon Verton
- Henri Debain
- Marie-Louise Iribe
- Alice Tissot
- Paulette Berger
- Max Bonnet (actor)
- Albert Bras
- Léon Courtois
- Gilbert Dacheux
- Guerineau
- Émile Saint-Ober
