= A Son from America (1932 film) =

1932 film directed by Carmine Gallone

- Directed by: Carmine Gallone
- Written by: Marcel Gerbidon (play); Pierre Veber (play); Pierre-Gilles Veber; Serge Véber
- Produced by: Adolphe Osso
- Starring: Albert Préjean; Annabella; Gaston Dubosc
- Cinematography: Curt Courant; Gérard Perrin
- Music by: Georges Van Parys
- Production company: Les Films Osso
- Distributed by: Les Films Osso
- Release date: 30 May 1932
- Running time: 91 minutes
- Countries: France; Hungary
- Language: French

A Son from America (Un fils d'Amérique) is a 1932 French-Hungarian comedy drama film directed by Carmine Gallone and starring Albert Préjean, Annabella, and Gaston Dubosc. It was a co-production made at the Hunnia Film Studios in Budapest. The same story had previously been made into a 1924 silent film of the same name.

== Cast ==
- Albert Préjean as Pierre Berterin
- Annabella as Dorette
- Gaston Dubosc as M. Berterin
- Guy Sloux as Guy Dupont
- Henri Kerny as Mouchin
- Jane Loury as Mme. Mouchin
- Simone Simon as Maryse

== Bibliography ==
- Jonathan Driskell. The French Screen Goddess: Film Stardom and the Modern Woman in 1930s France. I.B.Tauris, 2015.
