= The Little Cafe (1931 film) =

1931 film

Le Petit Café
- Directed by: Ludwig Berger
- Written by: Tristan Bernard (play); Jacques Bataille-Henri; Vincent Lawrence
- Produced by: Ludwig Berger
- Starring: Maurice Chevalier; Yvonne Vallée; Tania Fédor; André Berley
- Cinematography: Henry W. Gerrard
- Edited by: Merrill G. White
- Music by: Newell Chase
- Production company: Paramount Pictures
- Distributed by: Paramount Pictures
- Release date: May 8, 1931 (French premiere)
- Running time: 85 minutes
- Country: United States
- Language: French

Le petit café is a 1931 French-language American Pre-Code musical film directed by Ludwig Berger and starring Maurice Chevalier, Yvonne Vallée and Tania Fédor. The film is a foreign-language version of the 1930 film Playboy of Paris, which was based on the play The Little Cafe by Tristan Bernard. Multiple-language versions were common in the years following the introduction of sound film, before the practice of dubbing became widespread. It was shot at the Joinville Studios in Paris.

The film received a better reception from critics than the English-language version had.

== Plot ==
Albert Loriflan, a waiter in a Paris cafe, unexpectedly inherits a large sum of money from a wealthy relative. His unscrupulous boss, Philibert, refuses to release him from his long-term contract in the hope that Albert will buy him off with a large payment. But Albert refuses, and continues to work at the cafe even though he is now very rich. Before long he falls in love with Philibert's daughter Yvonne.

== Cast ==
- Maurice Chevalier as Albert Lorifian
- Yvonne Vallée as Yvonne Philibert
- Tania Fédor as Mademoiselle Berengère
- André Berley as Pierre Bourdin
- Emile Chautard as Philibert
- Françoise Rosay as Mademoiselle Edwige
- George Davis as Paul Michel
- Jacques Jou-Jerville as M. Cadeaux
- André Baugé
- Sonia Sebor

== Bibliography ==
- Bradley, Edwin M. The First Hollywood Musicals: A Critical Filmography Of 171 Features, 1927 Through 1932. McFarland, 2004.
