= The Little Cafe (1919 film) =

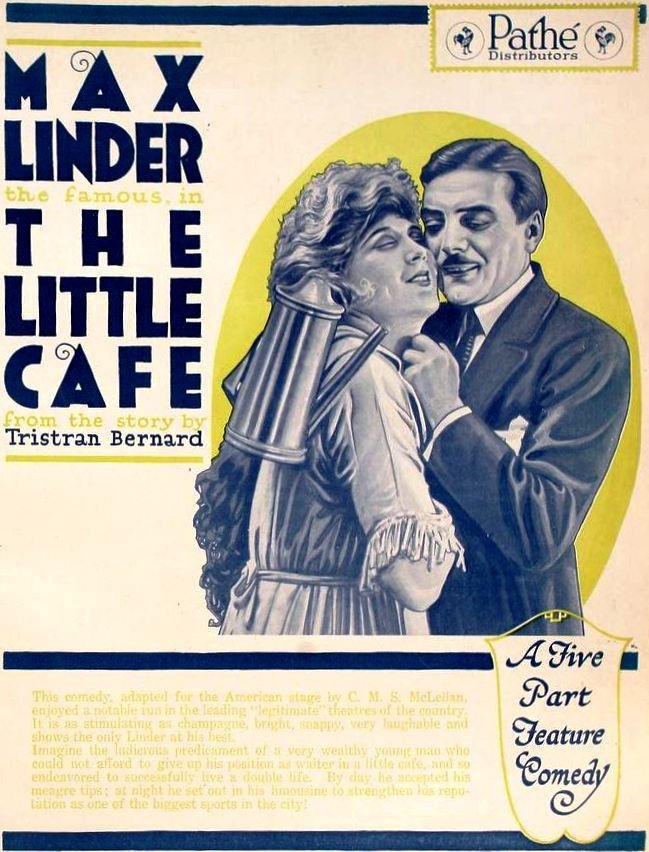
- Ad for the 1920 American release
- Directed by: Raymond Bernard
- Written by: Tristan Bernard (play); Henri Diamant-Berger; Max Linder; Raymond Bernard
- Starring: Max Linder; Armand Bernard; Joffre; Wanda Lyon
- Production company: Pathé
- Distributed by: Pathé
- Release date: 19 December 1919
- Running time: 55 minutes
- Country: France
- Language: Silent (French intertitles)

The Little Cafe (French: Le petit café) is a 1919 French silent comedy film directed by Raymond Bernard and starring Max Linder, Armand Bernard and Joffre. It was based on the 1911 play The Little Cafe by Tristan Bernard.

== Synopsis ==
After inheriting a large sum of money, a Parisian waiter has to keep working in a cafe to honour his contract to his unscrupulous employer. While working there, he falls in love with his employer's daughter.

== Cast ==
- Max Linder as Albert
- Armand Bernard as Bouzin
- Joffre as Philibert
- Wanda Lyon as Yvonne
- Flavienne Merindol as Edwige
- Halma as Bigredon
- Major Heitner as Pianiste Tzigane
- Andrée Barelly as Bérangère d'Aquitaine
- Henri Debain as Le plongeur

== Bibliography ==
- Bradley, Edwin M. The First Hollywood Musicals: A Critical Filmography Of 171 Features, 1927 Through 1932. McFarland, 2004.
