= Jules Chancel =

French journalist and writer (1867–1944)

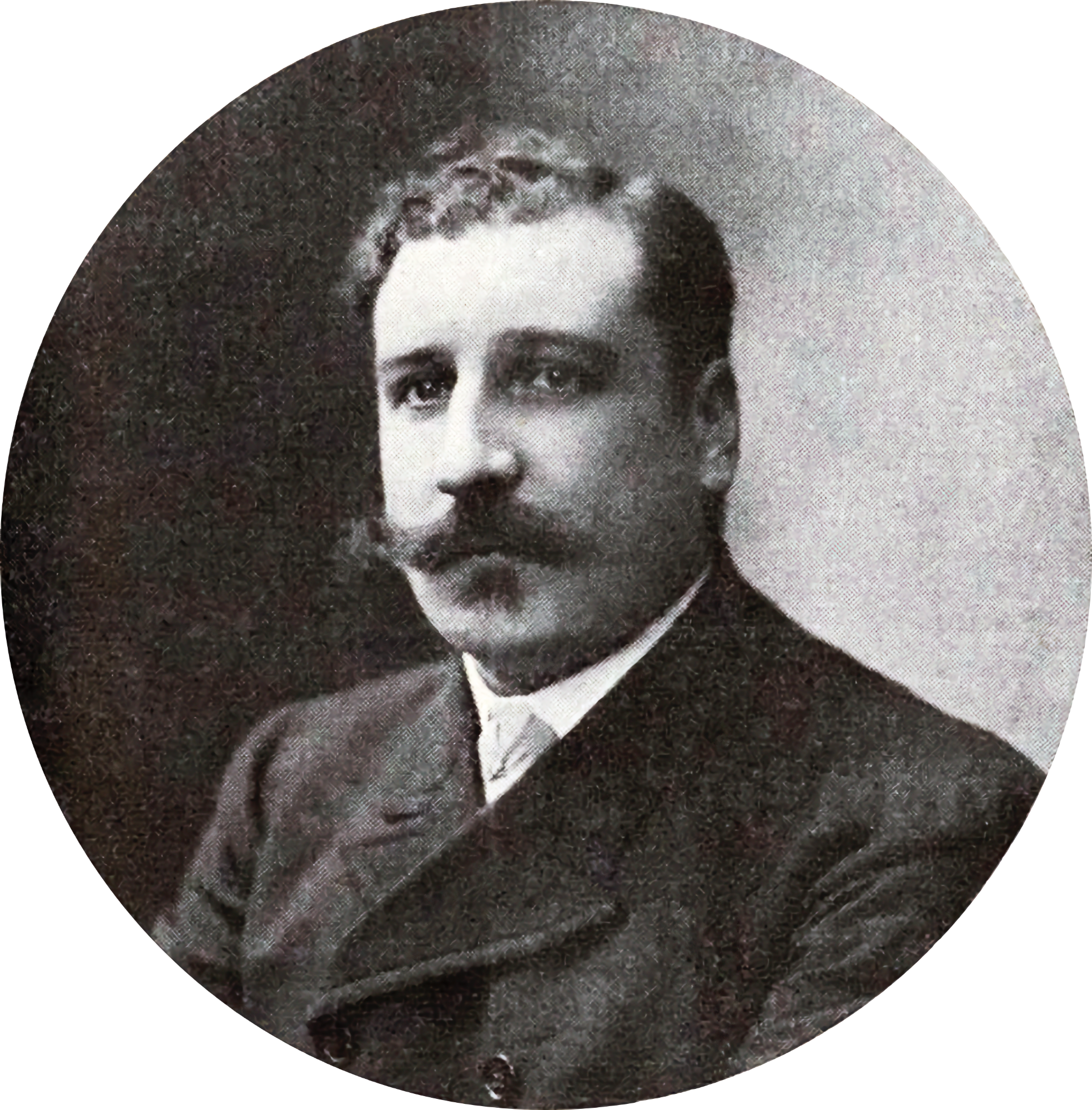
- Born: September 25, 1867; Marseille
- Died: 20 January 1944 (aged 76); Versailles
- Occupations: Journalist, writer

Jules Chancel (25 September 1867 – 20 January 1944) was a French journalist and writer, particularly active in books for children.

== Biography ==
A nephew of Jules Charles-Roux, he is the father of Jean-Louis Chancel and Ludovic Chancel.

Volunteer in the army, he was seconded to the British staff as war correspondent for the L'Illustration newspaper. As journalist, he has collaborated namely for L'Illustration, the Figaro, the L'Écho de Paris and the Excelsior.

Playwright and children's books author, his best known series are Children through history and Children in the colonies. Several of his works were crowned by the Académie française.

These books were illustrated by illustrators of the time like Raymond de La Nézière or Jules Fontanez.

== Works ==
Children through history:

- Cocorico 1596–1651 reître d'Henri IV illustrated by Edmond Gros
- Petit marmiton, grand musicien 1625–1650 illustrated by Jules Fontanez
- Le petit fauconnier de Louis XIII dito
- Les Petits Ménétriers de Duguay-Trouin 1711, illustrated by Edmond Gros
- Le petit jockey du duc de Lauzun. Epoque 1785–1793. illustrated by Raymond de La Nézière
- Le moucheron de Bonaparte. 1795–1805 illustrated by Raymond de La Nézière
- Tiarko le chevrier de Napoléon 1805–1815 Tiarko le chevrier de Napoléon

Children in colonies

- Lulu au Maroc
- Le prince Mokoko
- 1910 : Le petit Roi du Masque Noir. éd. Delagrave (Paris)
- Le secret de l'Emir.
- Un petit émigrant en Argentine illustrations by L. Bombled
- Un petit comédien au Brésil illustrations by Raymond de La Nézière
- 1917 : Sous le masque allemand. Guerre franco-allemande (1914–1917). Delagrave
- 1919 : Un match Franco-Américain La grande guerre (1914–1919) Delagrave Paris

== Adaptation ==
- 1910 : Rêve de valse, operetta in 3 acts, adaptation by Léon Xanrof and Jules Chancel, after Felix Dörmann and Leopold Jacobson, music from Oscar Straus, Paris, Théâtre de l'Apollo
