= L'Assiette au Beurre =

French satirical magazine (1901 to 1936)

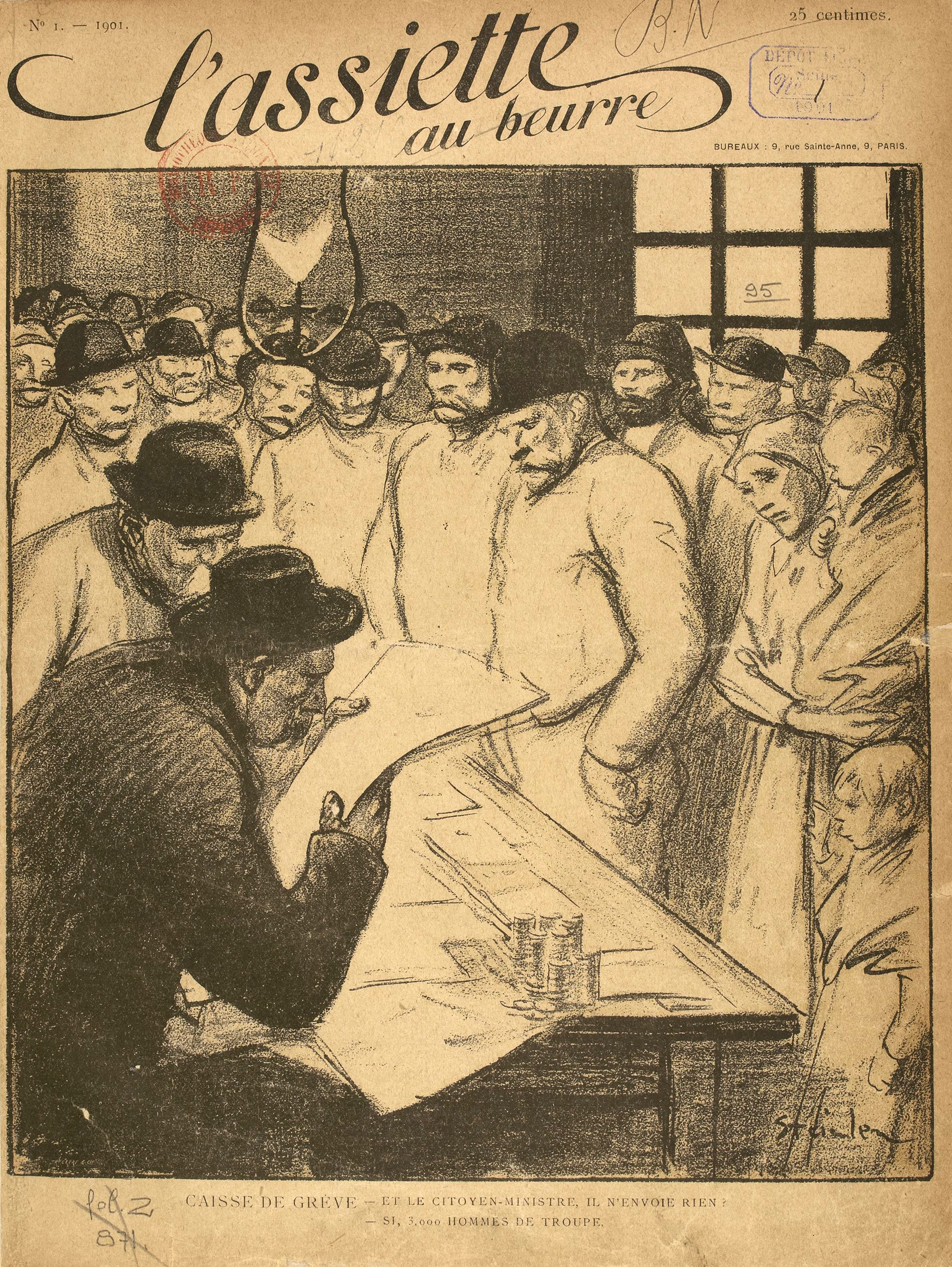
- L'Assiette au Beurre issue 1; cover designed by Théophile Steinlen.
- Format: 25 cm × 32 cm (9.8 in × 12.6 in)
- Founder: Samuel-Sigismond Schwarz; subsequent directors: André de Joncières & Georges Anquetil
- Founded: 4 April 1901
- Final issue: 1936
- Country: France
- Based in: Paris
- Language: French
- ISSN: 2021-0558
- OCLC: 1514496

L'Assiette au Beurre (literally The Butter Plate, and roughly translating to the English expression pork barrel) was an illustrated French weekly satirical magazine with anarchist political leanings that was chiefly produced between 1901 and 1912. It was revived as a monthly for a time and ceased production in 1936.

The magazine's caricature and editorial cartoon content was drawn from a varied cadre of illustrator-contributors of many backgrounds and disparate artistic styles. The content often focused on socialist and anarchist ideas. The first series expired on 15 October 1912. A second series was published between 1921 and 1925 on a monthly basis, eventually becoming a single supplement.

At the time of its founding near the start of the twentieth century, France was divided on crucial issues such as the extension of military service, revanchism (the call of French nationalists to avenge and reclaim from Germany the annexed territories of Alsace-Lorraine), right of association, separation of church and state, freedom of speech, and the emergence of new and radical political and social ideas in France such as revolutionary syndicalism, antimilitarism, anti-clericalism, Proletarian internationalism, feminism and the rise of labour law, which were all subjects of feature in the magazine.

L'Assiette au Beurre is a valuable iconographic testament of the Belle Époque ("Beautiful Era") period in France, characterized by optimism, peace at home and in Europe, new technology and scientific discoveries. Georges Wolinski (killed in the terrorist attack on Charlie Hebdo), indicated in 2011 that his magazine's work was the legacy of L'Assiette au Beurre.

== Description ==
From its first appearance, L'Assiette au Beurre registered as a departure in form from other French humor publications. Each issue was made up of chiefly two- or three-color-inked cartoons and caricatures, given full- or sometimes double-page placement (instead of the more common quarter page real estate granted to such content in related French publications), with each installment containing a minimum of 16 illustrated pages. Special editions held up to 48 pages. Images were published from original drawings using a zincography, planographic printing process.

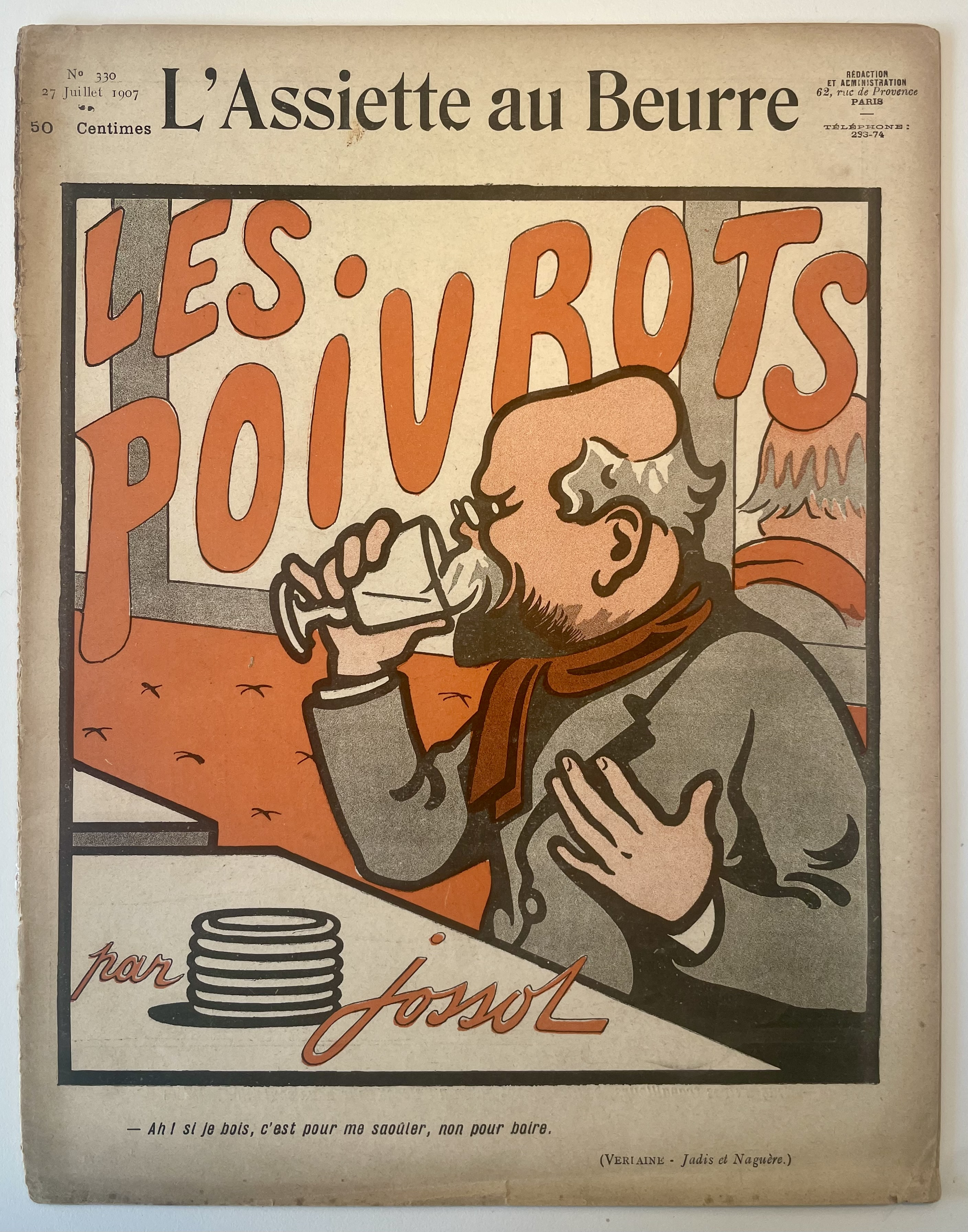
Caricature de Paul Verlaine par Henri Gustave Jossot, L'assiette au Beurre 1907.

Periodically, a single artist was chosen for an issue to provide a variety of panels on a specific topic, making that issue a veritable collected album for that illustrator. Sometimes a team was employed as well. According to Kevin C. Robbins in Roving Anarchists Flâneurs: The Visual Politics of Popular Protest via Parisian Street Art in L'Assiette au beurre (1900-1914), "For the most sardonic of multi-media exploits, Assiette staff paired artists with noted, left-wing essayists, poets, or novelists who provided suggestions for timely or provocative captions for each image submitted."

== History ==
=== Founding ===
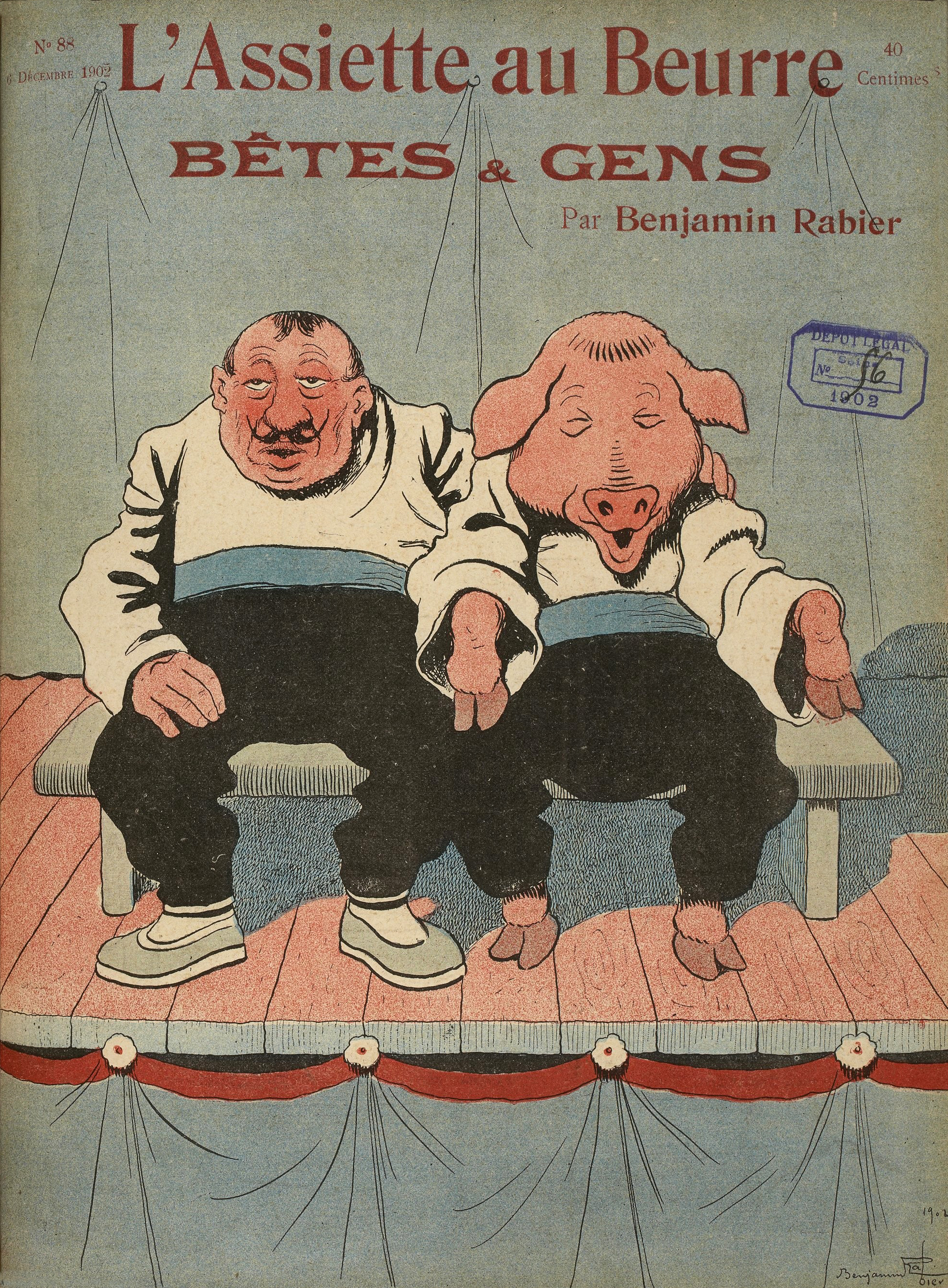
Cover of L'Assiette au Beurre no. 88 (6 December 1902), composed by Benjamin Rabier. Bêtes et gens translates to "man and beast".

Samuel Sigismond Schwarz was the magazine's founder and director. Schwarz was a Jewish immigrant to France from Hungary, becoming a French naturalized citizen.

After arriving in Paris in 1878, Schwarz became a book broker, specializing in the work of Victor Hugo through association with Paul Meurice. He later managed and was the editor of Le Frou Frou (1900-1923), another French humorist periodical that famously featured Picasso sketches, as well as Le Tutu and Le Pompon — magazines also in the humorist vein and known to have had anti-Dreyfusard leanings. Sigismund established a presence in 1895 at 9 rue Sainte-Anne in Paris as an editor of serial novels and later opened a retail space on behalf of Librairie Schwarz, located at 58 Rue de la Chaussée-d'Antin.

He launched the first issue of L'Assiette au Beurre on 4 April 1901, priced at 25 centimes; it did not have a specific theme, which later editions often did. The front cover illustration titled "Caisse de grève" ("Strike Fund") was by Théophile Steinlen and referred to the labour movement in the communes of Montceau-les-Mines and the involvement of Pierre Waldeck-Rousseau, among other Interior Ministers. Other illustrations appearing in the first edition include one by Adolphe Willette depicting the signing of an illustrated letter that plays on the idiomatic meaning of "L'Assiette au Beurre" – to lines one pockets.

This was followed by a Jean Veber drawing occupying two pages, and then by works by Charles Léandre, Gustave-Henri Jossot, Steinlein, Jacques Villon, Charles Huard, Hermann Vogel, Pierre-Georges Jeanniot, Henri-Gabriel Ibels, František Kupka, Auguste Roubille and finally by a Hermann-Paul drawing. Although there was little accompanying text, and no clear anarchist theme to the content, the first issue's tone is fiercely satirical and disrespectful of institutions and the affluent; a trend that increased in later editions.

At inception, L'Assiette au Beurre contained no advertising in its body, but was circulated with a 4-page insert, showcasing Sigismund periodicals and literary productions, as well as editions of classic books, to be purchased directly or through a subscription.

=== Developments ===
Starting with the fourth issue's cover, the graphic presentation was changed to emulate that of a newspaper. Such typographical variation was quite unusual in the media of the day, though Cocorico had previously paved the way by giving their designers freedom to innovate in the manner. Issue no. 14 was the first to take up a theme, conveyed by its title: "La guerre" ("War"). It was illustrated with 14 lithographs signed by Hermann Paul.

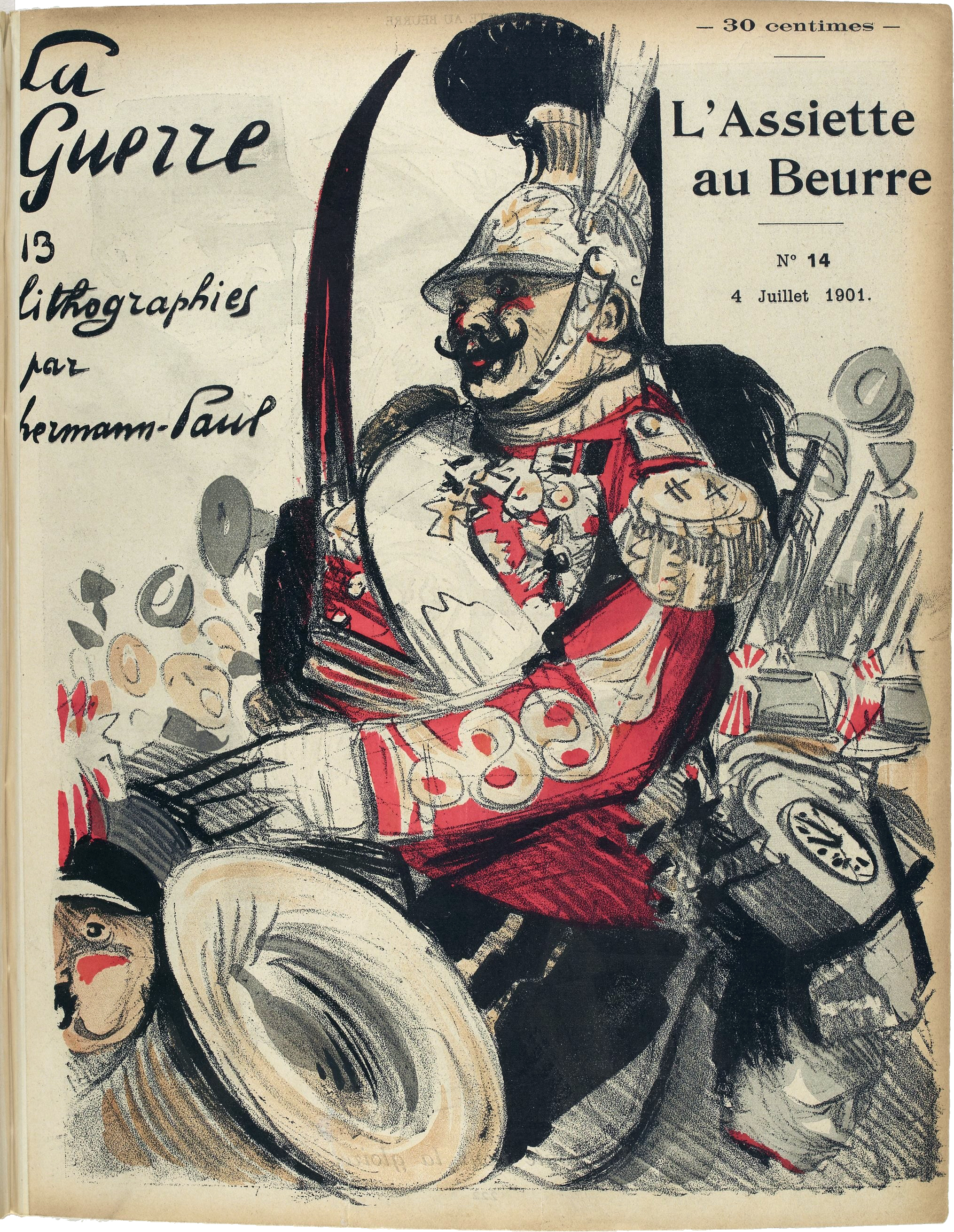
n° 14, 4 July 1901

The first special edition of the magazine, released in February 1902, sold for 1 franc and was headlined and took up the theme of "empoisonneurs patentés" ("Patented Poisoners" – referring to a cause célèbre in the France of the time that regarded the practice of tainting milk by adding filler, such as impure water, to increase profits). Júlio Tomás Leal da Câmara, a Portuguese painter and cartoonist who was famous in the Paris of the Belle Epoque, produced the cover, and the issue lambasted the industry for its tainted milk and other industrial food practices that were a fraud on the public. In December 1903, the paper starts printing a "false" cover without images, to guard against censorship, and at the same time to offer advertisements on the back cover.

One of the more unusual issues artistically and in format was no. 48, entitled "Crimes et châtiments" ("Crime and Punishment"). Published on 1 March 1902, and composed by Félix Vallotton, it consists of 23 lithographs printed only on the front and perforated to make each etching detachable, thus rendering it a true album of prints. The selling price was increased to 50 centimes. The format was never repeated, making it a unique feature in the magazine's run.

The first issues sold between 25,000 and 40,000 copies and garnered a profit. In 1902, Sigismund recorded sales approaching 250,000 copies. However, at the end of that year, the publication experienced its first failure linked to poor sales of some of its other titles but managed to recapitalize its newspaper group.

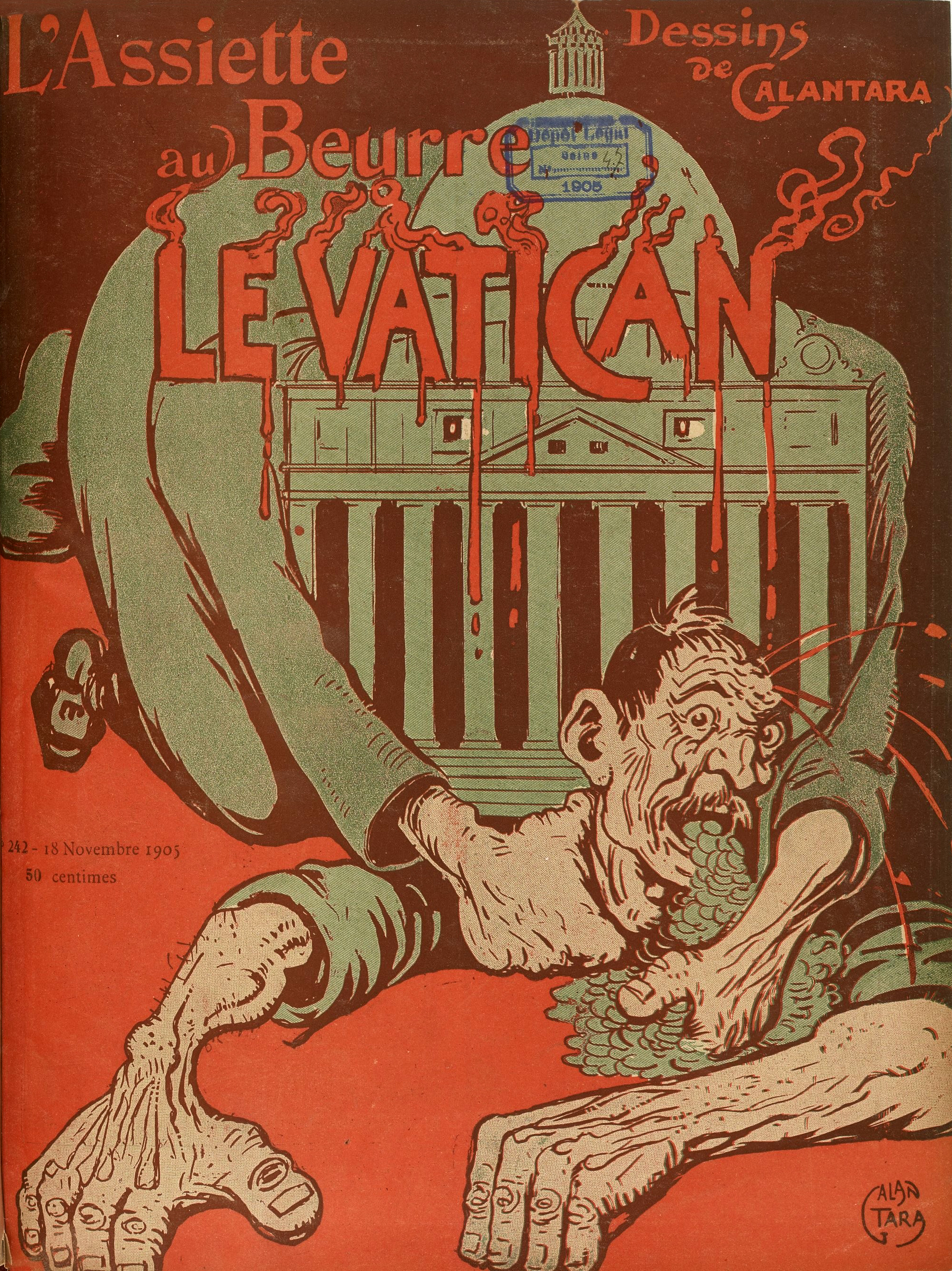
Issue no. 242, featuring Gabriele Galantara (18 November 1905).

In October 1903, at a time when business in general appeared to be going wrong for Sigismund, he passed management of the magazine over to a certain "de Boulay". The quality of the content held up under his stewardship, as did its sales. In August 1904, management was taken over by Charles Bracquart, followed by one E. Victor. The magazine's printing was moved to a more modern location at 62 rue de Provence – the offices of the established art magazine L’Épreuve, administered since at least 1903 by André Joncières, the heir to a large fortune. In January 1905, the management weekly was taken over by Joncières, who remained in control until October 1912. Joncières introduced advertising and derivative products (post cards, almanacs, calendars, etc.). The magazine's last address was 51 rue du Rocher. The penultimate issue (593) should never have appeared and had the ultimate theme "Les Vieilles Filles" ("Old Girls").

Between 1907 and 1912 Joncières broadened the magazine's appeal abroad by incorporating material about organizations such as the Second International, the CGT and various European socialist parties; the printing of Franco-German and Franco-English special issues, with bilingual captions; inviting outside cartoonists to contribute; and by coverage of significant socio-political events, such as the great French general strike of September 1911.

== Decline of the series (1910-1912) ==
L'Assiette au Beurre is a periodical demanding an artistic point of view, and its production cost was significant from the outset. From 1910 to 1911, the production values suffered due to financial troubles. Joncières subsidized the magazine with his fortune in an attempt to keep the price to 50 centimes. The last issue of the first series, no. 594, came out on 12 October 1912. The first series comprised 593 numbers, excluding special issues.

Joncières died in August 1920. Georges Anquetil revived L'Assiette au Beurre on 20 November 1921 in a monthly edition. From October 1925 to January 1927, the white Blackbird makes its literary supplement. Subsequently, editions were more scarce until 1936 where the title disappears officially, although between 1943 and 1944 some reprisal editions were published containing content from the first series.

== First series illustrators ==
L'Assiette au Beurre was primarily a work of illustrators; more than 9,600 discrete drawing were produced.

- Jack Abeillé
- Adaramakaro
- Andrisek
- Apa
- Aroun-al-Rachid
- Gil Baer
- Paul Balluriau
- Emmanuel Barcet
- Jacques Baseilhac
- Émile Bayard
- Bellery-Desfontaines
- René Berger
- Édouard Bernard
- Henry Bing
- Otto Bleistift
- Paul Bour
- Henri Boutet
- Léopold Braun
- Zyg Brunner [Zyg]
- Georges Bruyer
- Léonce Burret
- Eugène Cadel
- Camara (Tomás Leal da Câmara)
- Leonetto Cappiello
- Caran d'Ache
- André Cahard
- Charles Émile Egli
- Georges Carré
- Édouard Carrier
- Carsten Ravn
- Chanteclair (Lucien Émery)
- Jules Chéret
- A. Clément
- Eugène Courboin
- Édouard Couturier
- Jules Grandjouan
- Dedina
- Aristide Delannoy
- Maurice Delcourt
- Döes (Louis Sabattier)
- Noël Dorville
- Didier Dubucq
- Hector Dumas
- Abel Faivre
- Pierre Falké
- Maurice Feuillet
- Florane (Louis Blanchard)
- Ricardo Florès
- Jean-Louis Forain
- Léon Fourment
- Frédéric Front
- Démétrios Galanis
- Gabriele Galantara
- Armand Gallo
- Georges Gaumet (Géo Gaumet)
- František Gellner
- Charles Genty
- Géo Dupuis
- Léon Carré
- Henry Gerbault
- Charles Gir
- César Giris
- Gosé
- Fernand-Louis Gottlob
- Henri Goussé
- Jules Grandjouan
- Juan Gris
- Jules Grün
- Lucien Guy
- Albert Guillaume
- Guydo
- Carl Happel
- Lucien Haye
- Oswald Heidbrinck
- André Hellé
- Joseph Hémard
- Jules Hénault
- Hermann-Paul
- Eugene Higgins
- Bernhard Hoetger
- Charles Huard
- Václav Hradecký
- Henri-Gabriel Ibels
- Georges Hillaireau
- Paul Iribe
- Charles-Boris de Jankowski
- Albert Jarach
- Pierre Georges Jeanniot
- Hippolyte Petitjean
- Gustave-Henri Jossot
- Paul Jouve
- Carl Jozsa
- Raphael Kirchner
- J. Kladoff
- Leó Kóber
- Konrad-Wagner
- František Kupka
- Chas Laborde
- Jean Émile Laboureur
- Ernest La Jeunesse
- Lami
- Raymond de La Nézière
- Fabien Launay
- Charles Léandre
- Camille Lefèvre
- Edmond Lempereur
- Georges Léonnec
- Alfred Le Petit
- Roberto Lewis
- Manuel Luque
- Louis Malteste
- Maurice Marodon
- Louis Marcoussis [Markous]
- Aris Mertzanoff
- Lucien Métivet
- Georges Meunier
- Arthur Michaël
- Tony Minartz
- Henry Mirande
- Hector Moloch
- Pierre-Louis Moreau
- Louis Morin
- Valéry Müller
- Cesare Musacchio
- Félix Nadar
- Bernard Naudin
- Nob
- Frisco Othman
- Manuel Orazi
- Georges d'Ostoya
- Pelele
- Petitjean
- Mario Pezilla
- Pierlis
- Rudolf Plaček
- Jean Plumet
- Paul Poncet
- Poulbot
- Vojtěch Preissig
- Benjamin Rabier
- Maurice Radiguet
- Gaston Raieter
- Georges Redon
- Raymond Renefer
- Albert Robida
- Roubille
- Sancha
- Marius Savignol
- Sidley
- Ardengo Soffici
- M. Steydlé
- Steinlen
- Strix
- Ludvík Strimpl
- Jehan Testevuide
- Paul Thesing
- Jules Grandjouan
- Evelio Torent
- André Triou
- Miklós Vadász
- Henry Valensi
- Kees van Dongen
- Félix Vallotton
- Jean Veber
- Jean Villemot
- Jacques Villon
- André Viriez
- Vogel
- Lucien-Henri Weiluc
- Wély
- David Ossipovitch Widhopff
- Adolphe Léon Willette
- Jacques Yvel
- Zagnoli
- Édouard François Zier

== Contributing writers ==
L'Assiette au Beurre at times had contributions from prominent writers:

- Henri Bachelin
- Dominique Bonnaud
- Frères Bonneff
- Vladimir Bourtzeff (1862-1942)
- André Dahl
- Jacques Dhur
- Anatole France
- Henri Guilbeaux (James Burkley)
- Ernest La Jeunesse
- Octave Mirbeau
- Émile Pataud
- Gaston de Pawlowski
- Jean Richepin
- Jehan Rictus
- Camille de Sainte-Croix
- André Salmon
- Laurent Tailhade

== Themes ==
The purpose of an anarchist, satirical weekly, that considers itself transgressive, is of course to mock forms of authorities of all stripes; the targets ran the map: autocrats, the rich, the military, police, artists and writers, scientists, academicians, politicians, priests and believers, often through fierce caricatures. At least in its early stages the magazine maintained a focus on political issues through its drawings, sometimes anti-semitic (in 1902, Judaism was skewered) and often anti-freemasonry and anti-imperialism. The plutocracy was systematically attacked. L'Assiette au Beurre employed more than two hundred artists of an international character. Social issues, often taboo, were also included, such as the death penalty, trafficking of children, sexuality, or even of the themes of daily life such as "L'argent" ("money"), "Le gaz" (gas"), "La police [et ses excès]" (the police and their excesses]), "L'alcool" ("alcohol"), "Paris la nuit" ("Paris by night"), and many others.

== List of theme issues ==
- No. 26: "Les camps de reconcentration du Transvaal" ("Concentration Camps in the South African Republic"), by Jean Veber, 1901.
- No. 30: "La prostitution" ("Prostitution"), by Kees van Dongen, 26 October 1901.
- No. 41: "L'argent" ("Money"), by Kupka, 11 January 1902.
- No. 42: "Les tueurs de la route" ("The Road Killers"), by Weiluc, 18 January 1902.
- No. 48: "Crimes et châtiments" ("Crime and Punishment")", by Félix Vallotton, 1 March 1902.
- No. 88: "Bêtes et gens" ("Man and Beast"), by Benjamin Rabier, 6 décembre 1902.
- No. 101: "Les Académisables", by Camara, 7 March 1903.
- No. 108: "Esthètes" ("Aesthetes"), by Paul Iribe, 25 avril 1903.
- No. 110: "Colonisons ! L'Algérie aux Algériens" ("Colonize! the Algeria Algerians"), by Jules Grandjouan, May 1903.
- No. 112: "La police" ("The police"), by Camara, Jules Grandjouan, Georges d'Ostoya, Léon Fourment, Lengo, 23 May 1903.
- No. 156: "Les refroidis" ("The Frozen"), by Jossot, 26 March 1904 (le conformisme social).
- No. 173: "Asiles et fous" (Asylums and the Mad"), by Aristide Delannoy, 23 July 1904.
- No. 178: "La graine" ("The Seed"), by Jossot, 27 août 1904 (sur le contrôle des naissances).
- No. 201: "Le Tzar rouge" ("The Red Tzar"), by divers dessinateurs don't Galanis, 4 février 1905 (la révolution russe de 1905).
- No. 214: "La grève" (Strike"), by Bernard Naudin et Jules Grandjouan, 6 May 1905.
- No. 263: "La liberté" ("Freedom of the Press"), by Roger Sadrin, 14 April 1906.
- No. 324: "Europa, numéro illustré international" ("Europa International Illustrated Number"), 15 June 1907.
- No. 348: "La prison de la Petite Roquette", text by Miguel Almereyda; illustrations d'Aristide Delannoy, 30 November 1907.
- No. 374: "Zola au Panthéon" ("Zola at the Pantheon"), by Georges d'Ostoya, 30 May 1908 (regarding the Dreyfus Affair).
- No. 389: "L'enfance coupable" ("Guilty Childhood"), by Bernard Naudin, 12 September 1908.
- No. 435: "Le grand soir" ("The Big Night"), text by Émile Pataud; illustrations by André Hellé, 7 May 1910.
- No. 510: "Promenade dans Paris, le Sacré-Cœur" ("A Walk through the Sacred Heart of Paris") 7 January 1911.
- No. 582: "Les Compensations" ("Compensation"), by Henry Valensi, 4 November 1911.

== Special editions and supplements ==
- "Les Empoisonneurs patentés - Les falsificateurs de lait" ("Patented Poisoners - the Milk Tainters), 48 pages, 1901.
- "Le cas de M. Monis" ("The Case of Mr. Monis"), No. 7, 8 pages, 21 May 1901 by Adolphe Willette.
- "Supplément littéraire [la guerre]" ("Literary Supplement [The War]"), No. 14, 8 pages, 4 July 1901.
- "Tartines de l'Assiette au beurre" ("Bread of the Butter plate"), 6 deliveries from 19 September 1901, composed by Camille de Sainte-Croix and illustrations by Maurice Feuillet.
- "La Foire aux croutes" (Frequently Asked Crusts") by Paul Iribe and Ernest La Jeunesse, 32 pages, June 1902 (issue nos. 62 and 63).
- "Les Masques" ("The Masks"), No. 8, 17 February and 7 April 1906.
- "L'Almanach de l'Assiette au beurre" ("The Butter Plate Almanac"), December 1906.
- "Madame la Baronne et sa famille, l'arbre généalogique" ("Madame la Baronne, her Family and Family Tree") by Maurice Radiguet, 1909.
- "Une page d'Espagne (L'assassinat de Ferrer)" ("A page from Spain (The assassination of Ferrer"), 1909.
- "Le Grand Paon" ("The Great Peacock") by Maurice Radiguet and Galanis, 1910.

== Readership and impact ==
The per issue price was relatively average for a weekly of its quality at the start: 25 centimes (on average 4 times the price of a non-illustrated daily), though the price would increase to up to 60 centimes depending on the number of pages. The price base was revised upward in May 1901 (30 cents per regular issue) and in 1905 again to 50 centimes, after Sigismund withdrew. The price iwas judged too high by some, including Jules Grandjouan, who ultimately wrote to Joncières about the issue.

In February 1906, Senator René Bérenger, nicknamed " Père la Pudeur" ("Father Modesty") championed a bill focused on child prostitution: under this pretext, he sought to censor what was deemed pornographic and obscene. With its legality uncertain, the in April 1908 the Chambre des députés (Chamber of Deputies), placed the sale of L'Assiette au Beurre under threat of police sanction. A sales ban was instituted in railway stations (to "protéger les yeux chastes de certains publics" ("protect the chaste eyes of the public"), while some of its composers were even arrested (e.g. Jules Grandjouan) and spent a few days in prison.

== Footnotes ==
1. According to W.M. Morton in the 1913 book Problems of Power, the titular idiomatic expression in French refers "to the desire of all French citizens to be given a place at the budgetary buffet and to be allowed to 'put their fingers in the pies' as often and as conveniently as they like".
2. Sigmund Samuel Schwarz was born 2 March 1858 in Miskolc.
3. Priced at 10 centimes, Le Tutu is a "humoristique hebdomadaire illustré" ("Illustrated weekly satirical") offering more than forty drawings in a less luxurious but more accessible format than Le Frou-Frou.
4. Priced at 10 centimes, Le Pompon is a "hebdomadaire illustré militaire" ("military weekly illustrated") containing cartoons chiefly of barracks humor that "peut être lu par tous" ("can be read by all").
5. "L'Assiette au Beurre", was formerly used as an alternate title of a show produced in 1885, in relation to the Incoherents art movement.
6. Unique drawings by this artist appear in L'Assiette au Beurre issue no. 151 (20 February 1904) regarding the Russo-Japanese War (cf. S. Applebaum, 1978 "The Artists", notice 1). He created postcard illustrations during this time period.
7. "Andrisek" as the artist was credited in L'Assiette au Beurre, is thought to be the pseudonym of Austrian artist Ferdinand Andri (1871-1956). Andrisek illustrations appeared in issues 532, 541 and 564-570.
8. "Apa" is the Pseudonym of Barcelona artist Feliú Elías i Bracons (1878-1948); he designed issue no. 553.
9. Mysterious designer, Henry Bing (Paris, August 23, 1888 - June 3, 1965), if it is indeed him, publishing his first drawings in L'Assiette au Beurre issue no. 413; others appeared in no. 442 (1909). One was on the subject of feminism, paired with the critic Robert Sigl. He worked in Berlin and Munich on Simplicissimus and Jugend). He lived for a time to the United States and later returned to Paris as an art dealer. He was, according to André Bay, a close friend of the painter Pascin.
10. Léopold Braun (Vienna, 1868 - Paris, 1943) was an Austrian painter and illustrator, who lived in Berlin in the 1890s and then in Paris. In 1914 he was in London, working on large painting of members of the House of Commons. He then lived in the U.S. before returning to Paris. He was the brother-in-law of Austrian politician Victor Adler.
11. A. Clément is reported was a printer lithographer operating around 1903. He composed L'Assiette au Beurre issue no. 54, on the theme of "Les Parvenus" ("The upstarts") (12 April 1902).
12. This supplement contains no illustrations but a text anthology.
