= Musicalism =

Art movement

Musicalism (French: musicalisme) was an art movement created in 1932 by Henry Valensi in collaboration with Charles Blanc-Gatti, Gustave Bourgogne and Vittorio Straquadaini.

Painters in the movement used colour material for its vibrations - Valensi himself spoke of sentimental resonances. Their paintings sought to synchronise colours and forms in space like a musician arranging his sound material directly in line with the emotions he or she was trying to express.

Musicalism is an artistic movement created by the painter Henry Valensi in 1932, with Charles Blanc-Gatti, Gustave Bourgogne and Vittorio Straquadaini.

== History ==
According to Raymond Bayer "musicalism was more than a school, it was a doctrine of art. It even went beyond being the doctrine which always contained it, for it was a body of knowledge forming a system ...". It was at once an art movement and the movement of art itself. Valensi produced an animated film, Spring Symphony (Symphonie printanière) using his paintings and the first colour film in 1936 in a film studio above his painting studio, giving form to what he named a "cinépeinture" ("film painting").

He organised the first of twenty-three musical salons at Paris's galerie Renaissance and in 1936 six such salons occurred across Europe from Amsterdam to Budapest. With each new salon, more and more artists joined the movement, such as Louis Baudon, Jean-Marie Euzet, Georges Filiberti, Arne Hosek, Louise Janin, Ernst Klausz, František Kupka, Marcel Lempereur-Haut, Felix Del Marle, Lancelot Ney, Jean and Joël Martel, Otto Freundlich, Ossip Zadkine, and Robert Mallet-Stevens.

The rights to Valensi's works are held by the Association Henry Valensi and since 2013 they have set up the reference website musicalisme.fr to make the movement better known and a biography of Valensi edited by Marie Talon which also traces the history of the artistic avant-garde in that period.

== Retrospectives ==
- 1990 : galerie Drouart, Paris, exposition Qu'est-ce que le musicalisme ? (What is musicalism?), showing works by H. Valensi, L. Janin, C. Blanc-Gatti, J.-M. Euzet, E. Klausz, F. Del Marle, G. Bourgogne, M. Lempereur-Haut, G. Filiberti, E. Beothy, V. Stracquadaini, H. Olive-Tamari and others
- October 2013 : Modernités plurielles (Plural Modernities, Paris, musée national d'Art moderne, showing Symphonie printanière and seven paintings

== Bibliography (in French) ==
- Sergent Marion, « Peinture et temps : la quête du mouvement chez les musicalistes », L'Art, machine à voyager dans le temps : https://www.fabula.org/colloques/document4742.php
- Sergent Marion, "De la toile à l’écran : une surface de projections psychiques pour les artistes musicalistes", Marges, 2020 : https://journals.openedition.org/marges/2268
- Sergent Marion, Les artistes musicalistes : théories et pratiques d'une union des arts (1932-1960), thèse de doctorat, Sorbonne-Université, 2021.
