= Rap-Up =

American music magazine

- The summer 2008 issue of Rap-Up—which featured Teyana Taylor, Keri Hilson and Solange Knowles on the cover—was redesigned to cater for the aging demographic.
- Editor-in-Chief: Devin Lazerine
- Categories: Music
- Frequency: Quarterly
- Publisher: Devin Lazerine
- First issue: July 2001
- Country: United States
- Language: English
- Website: www.rap-up.com
- ISSN: 1943-4006

Rap-Up is a magazine launched in 2001 by founder Devin Lazerine. The publication was originally a website devoted to hip hop, until Lazerine decided to pitch the possibility of a magazine to several publishers. The magazine is focused on the hip hop and R&B aspect of the music industry, and predominantly features interviews with artists, actors and other entertainers. Issued quarterly, the magazine's target audience was the 14 to 28 demographic, although the demographic has become older over time.

The magazine's first two issues were one time deals, although Lazerine and his brother Cameron received attention for their age and white background. The magazine restarted publication in 2005, when it managed to sell enough copies to ensure future releases. A separate handbook has been released, chronicling the history of hip hop, "Rap-Up:The Ultimate Guide to Hip-Hop and R&B".

== History ==
Rap-Up was founded by Devin Lazerine when he was 15 years old as an after-school hobby; the magazine was an online compendium of hip hop news, gossip and top-ten music lists. After listening to the song "Insane in the Brain" by Cypress Hill at the age of 10, he wanted to be in the music industry but "wasn't able to sing or rap, so that wasn't an option". Several days after launching the website, Devin decided to pitch the idea of a magazine to select publishers; the next day, a publisher from H&S Media expressed interest in the concept. Devin worked with his brother Cameron to create the magazine, and decided it would be for a young audience, in particular the 14 to 28 demographic. The magazine's first issue was published by H&S Media in July 2001; however, the company went bankrupt shortly after publishing the first issue, which sold 200,000 copies. Rap-Up was resurrected in 2003 by Total Media Group as an insert in the magazine Urban Teen Scene. The insert attracted media attention—mainly because of the brothers' age and race—in USA Today and The Los Angeles Times.

The brothers began working on a third issue in 2004, without the backing of a publishing company. The largest advertisers were ring tone providers, while others included the Navy, clothing labels, videogames, Sony, Black Entertainment Television and Reebok. The editorials were written by 10 journalism students, and the photos were contributed by publicists. Art director Ian Lynam, who designed the magazine, sent everything online from Japan. The issue was released in March 2005, and cost $35,000 to produce. It featured singer Chingy on the cover, and 80,000 copies were distributed around the world. Beginning with the eleventh issue, which was published in summer 2008, Lynam redesigned the magazine's cover and contents. The main reason for the redesign was the change from a younger target audience to an older and more sophisticated one. Lynam felt the facelift "imbue[d] it with a more demure and cosmopolitan aesthetic."

The magazine is not audited, and is sold in more than 20 countries. In the U.S., the magazine is sold by Wal-Mart, Barnes & Noble, and Tower Records. Devin calls Rap-Up "a magazine for Generation Y by Generation Y". He serves as a writer, publisher and editor in chief, and oversees editorial content and advertising sales. Cameron works as publisher and assistant editor, and is in charge of printing, production, distribution and shipping of the magazine. In 2008, the magazine released a handbook entitled, Rap-Up: The Ultimate Guide to Hip-Hop and R&B, which was published by Grand Central Publishing/Hachette Book Group. The book chronicles the history of hip hop, and features a foreword by rapper T.I.

== Impact ==
In 2003, Devin was included on Fast Company's list of "Champions of Innovation whose achievements are changing companies and our culture". In 2006, the magazine was nominated for "Best New Consumer Publication" at the 55th Annual Maggie Awards. In 2007, the website Rap-Up.com received a nomination for "Best Hip-Hop Magazine Site" at the Vh1 Hip Hop Honors.
