= Hermann Vogel =

Hermann Vogel refers to:

- Hermann Wilhelm Vogel (1834–1898), photochemist
- Hermann Carl Vogel (1841–1907), astronomer
- Hermann Vogel (German illustrator) (1854–1921)
- Hermann Vogel (French illustrator) (1856–1918)
