= Lubin de Beauvais =

French painter (1873–1917)

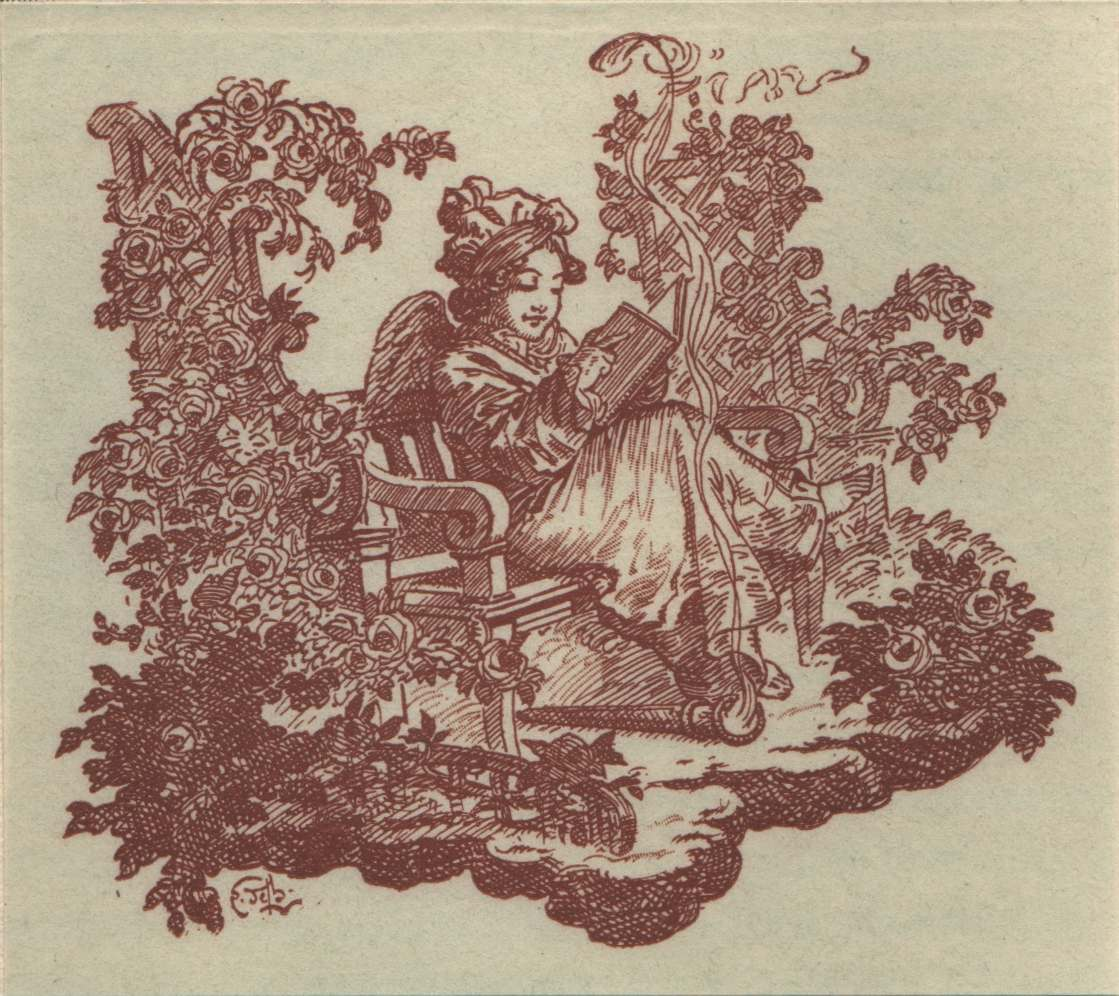
Thémidore ou mon histoire et celle de ma maîtresse (1911)

Lubin Paul Gaston de Beauvais (26 March 1873 – 3 January 1917) was a French painter, watercolourist, draughtsman, and illustrator. He mainly illustrated children's books, working mostly in red chalk and watercolour. He also used the pseudonym Gabriel de Laumont for lithographs and illustrations of galants works, a name he borrowed from his mother.

== Life ==
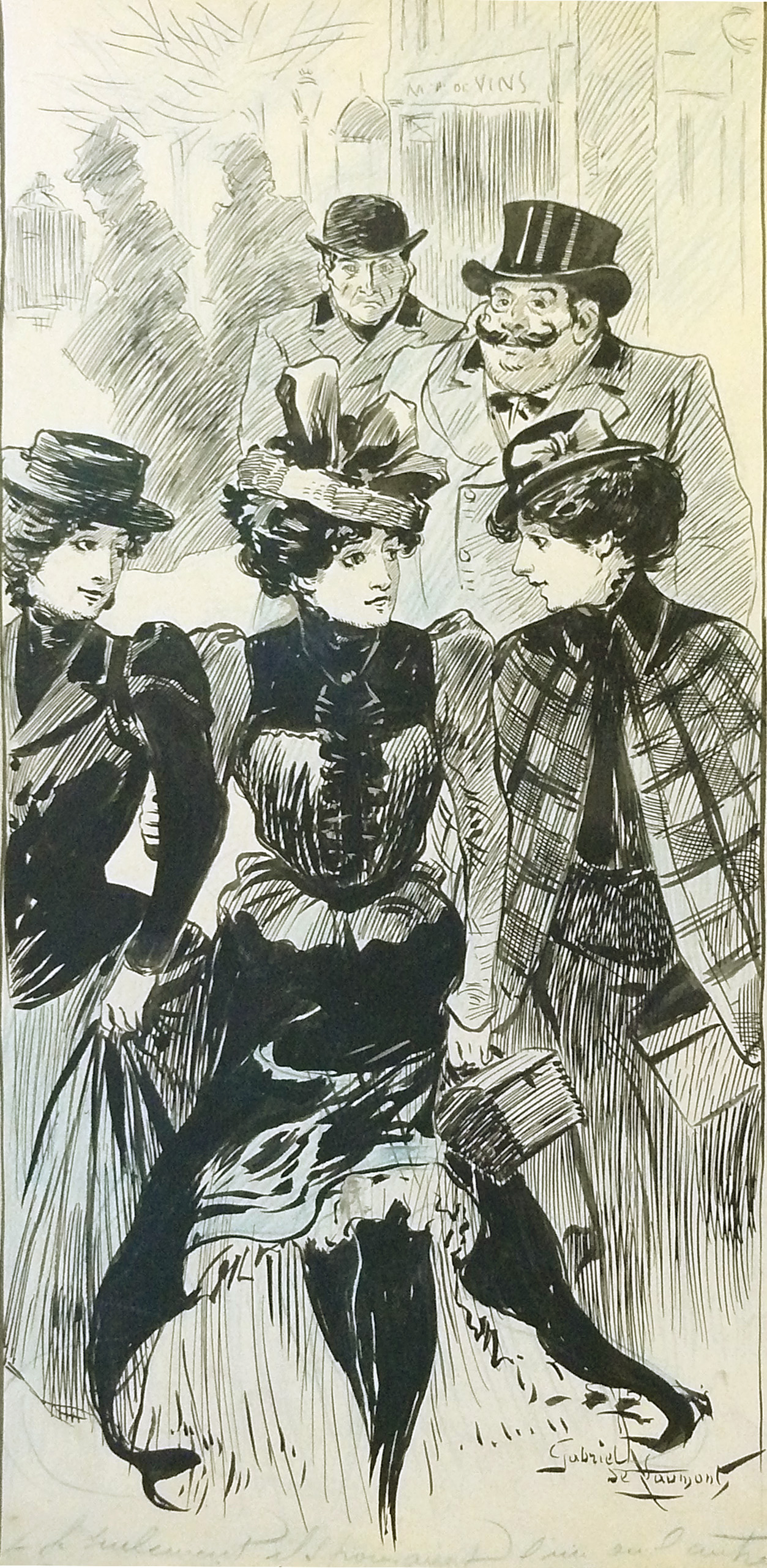
Trois élégantes…

Lubin de Beauvais was born on 26 March 1873. He took courses at the Beaux-Arts de Paris from 1887 to 1889, and signed his first press cartoons for the Courrier français in 1892.

He collaborated with many Parisian newspapers and magazines, including La Baïonnette, Le Charivari, Le Frou-frou, L'Assiette au Beurre, Le Rire, Gil Blas illustré, La Libre Parole illustrée, and La Vie Parisienne, as well as children's magazines. He also illustrated musical scores, postcards, and novels.

He took part in the humourists' exhibition in Copenhagen in 1909 and the Salon des Humoristes in Paris in 1910.

He died in the 14th arrondissement of Paris on 3 January 1917.

== Illustrated works ==
- Jérôme Doucet (Pierrelée), Contes d'un loup de mer (Félix Juven, 1904)
- Charles Val (Charles Poisson), L'Art d'être cocu (Library of the Fin de siècle, 1905)
- Emile Watin, Les trois pages de Monsieur d'Artagnan (Félix Juven, 1905)
- Victor Joze and Jeanne Compoint, Les Amours défendues (Paris: De Porter, 1907)
- Choderlos De Laclos, Les Liaisons dangereuses (1908)
- Godard d'Aucour, Thémidore, ou mon histoire et celle de ma maîtresse, (Paris: Albert Méricant, 1911)
- Alfred de Musset, Les Deux Maitresses (1912)
