= Didier Dubucq =

Belgian cartoonist and journalist

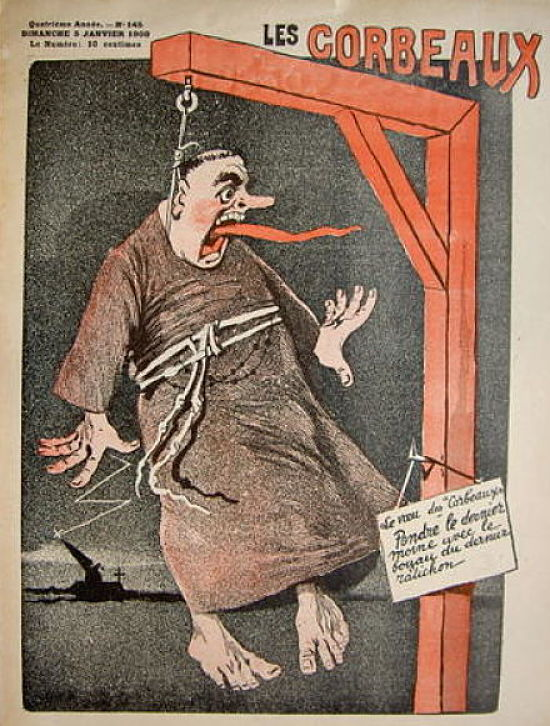
Les Corbeaux, No. 145, 5 January 1908

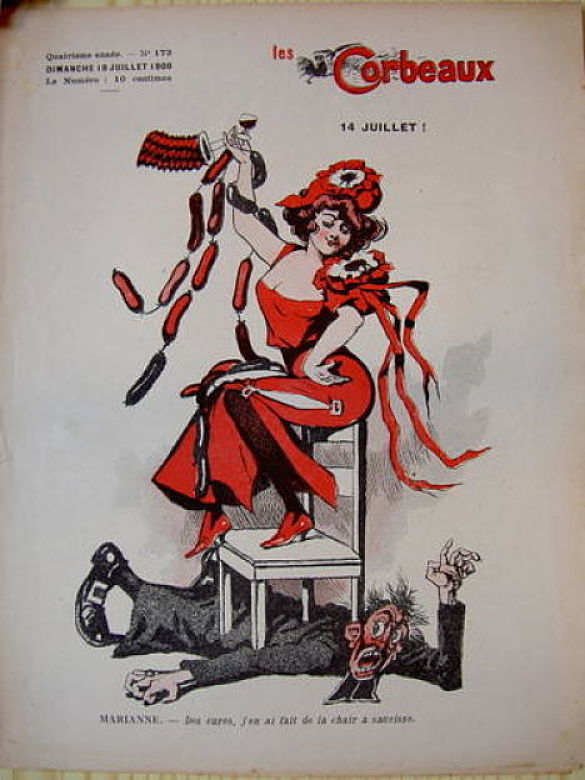
Les Corbeaux, No. 173, 13 July 1908

Didier Dubucq was a mysterious Belgian cartoonist and journalist. Freethinker and anti-clerical, he founded the newspaper Les Corbeaux, which he directed between 1904 and 1909. He sometimes signed his caricatures as "Ashavérus".

== Career ==
The signature of Didier Dubucq appeared in 1901, in one of the first issues of L'Assiette au Beurre. His drawings were aimed at Tsar Nicholas II, who traveled to France for an official visit.

The name of Didier Dubucq then reappeared with Les Corbeaux, a newspaper he launched in Brussels in May 1904. The tone was resolutely anticlerical: this periodical arose in a sensitive context, at least in France where the "1905 French law on the Separation of the Churches and the State" was adopted on 9 December 1905.

Originally established in Belgium, Les Corbeaux appeared on Sundays and was sold for 10 centimes, in a Catholic country where clerics clashed on one side with "liberals" on the other. After a few months, the periodical was gradually boycotted in the kiosks and railway stations: Dubucq attacked the government and the monarchy which justified the exploitation of workers in the name of a conservatism based on religion. In April 1905, Dubucq chose to leave for Paris where he re-established his journal at 11 rue du Croissant, surrounded by a team composed of Maurice Barthélemy, Dr. Simon N., the Belgian Joseph Ghysen, who headed Le Lanternier, Pierre Érard and a certain Gardanne. The newspaper was affiliated with the National Association of Free Thinkers of France, the Human Rights League of France, and the Association anticlerical des Lanterniers. In 1905, the German Empire banned its distribution in Alsace-Lorraine.

As early as May 1906 Les Corbeaux published "images of anti-clerical propaganda (...) to be spread everywhere". These 16 x 18 cm leaflets with anti-clerical drawings on fifteen different subjects were to be distributed "at conferences, public meetings, polling station doors, cafes", as well as posters to be pasted, calendars, almanacs and quantities of postcards (about 150).

In September 1906, La Calotte, a new anti-clerical newspaper, came out of the press. The establishment reacted harshly to this militancy that soon aggravated the workers' rumblings and the increasingly menacing trade union movements: cartoonists like Jules Grandjouan or Aristide Delannoy were imprisoned, Georges Clemenceau became the "first cop of France" against the militant press with an anarcho-syndicalist tendency.

After being sued in January 1909 by a Grenoble association for "outrages against public morality" Les Corbeaux disappeared at the end of 1909.

== See also ==
=== Bibliography ===
- John Grand-Carteret, Popold II roi des Belges et des belles devant l'objectif caricatural, Paris, Louis-Michaud éditeur, 1908 – online.
- Guillaume Doizy, Jean-Bernard Lalaux, À bas la calotte ! La caricature anticléricale et la séparation des Églises et de l’État, Paris, Éditions Alternatives, 2005, ISBN 978-2862274591.
- Michel Dixmier, Jacqueline Lalouette, Didier Pasamonik, La République et l’Église. Images d'une querelle, Paris, Éditions de La Martinière, 2005, ISBN 978-2732432885.
- Guillaume Doizy, Les Corbeaux contre la calotte. La lutte anticléricale par l’image à la Belle Époque, éditions Libertaires, 2007, ISBN 978-2914980470, online presentation.
- Guillaume Doizy, L'image, le rire et la libre pensée militante, exemple de la revue franco-belge Les Corbeaux (1905–1909), Gavroche, revue d'histoire populaire, No. 140, mars-avril 2005, p. 8-13.

=== Archives ===
- Les corbeaux, Brussels, Royal Library of Belgium: archive.

=== Related articles ===
- Anti-clericalism
- Freethought

=== External links ===
- Anticlerical cards from the journal Les Corbeaux
