= Noël Dorville =

French painter

Noël Dorville, born in Mercurey, France in 1874, died in Cosne-sur-Loire in 1938, was a French painter who was known for newspaper cartoons and posters. He made many portraits of contemporary French politicians and writers. Dorville sketched at the 1899 trial of Alfred Dreyfus. He attended the Paris Peace Conference in 1919 as a journalist, making intimate drawings of participants such as Woodrow Wilson, David Lloyd George and Georges Clemenceau. He was a frequent contributor to L'Assiette au beurre.

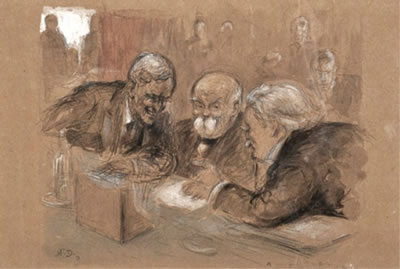
Woodrow Wilson, Georges Clemenceau and David Lloyd George confer at the Paris Peace Conference (Noël Dorville, 1919)

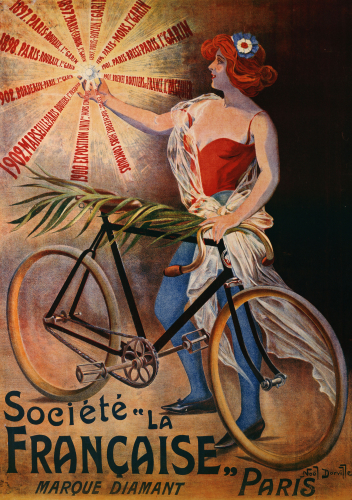
Poster advertising Société Française, (Noël Dorville, 1902)
