= Gustave-Henri Jossot =

French painter

Gustave-Henri Jossot (later known as Abdul Karim)
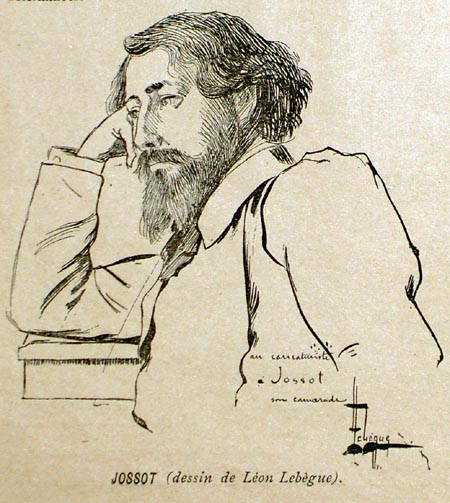
- Henri Gustave Jossot, by Léon Lebègue, 1894
- Born: Henri Gustave Jossot; 16 April 1866; Dijon, France
- Died: 7 April 1951 (aged 84); Sidi Bou Saïd, Tunisia
- Education: Jean Paul Laurens and Eugène Carrière
- Known for: Caricaturist, illustrator, poster designer, Orientalist painter and writer
- Movement: Orientalist

Gustave-Henri Jossot, also known as Abdul Karim Jossot (English: /ʒɒˈsoʊ/ zhoh-SOH, French: [ɡystav ɑ̃ʁi ʒɔso]; 1866–1951), was a French artist, caricaturist, and writer, born in Dijon. He is known for working on L'Assiette au Beurre. In 1911, he first travelled to Tunisia, where he would settle for the rest of his life and career, publishing in local magazines.

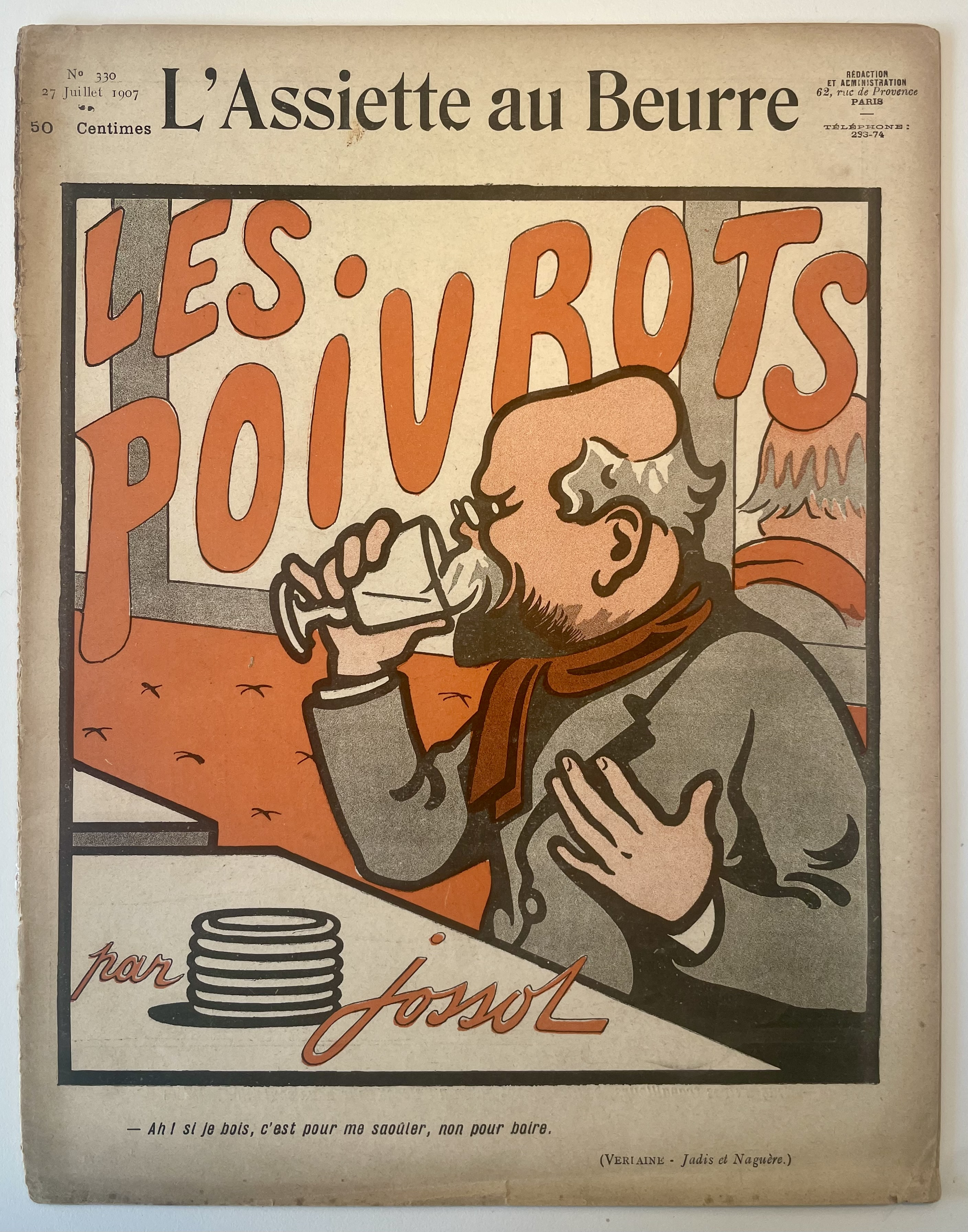
Caricature de Paul Verlaine par Henri Gustave Jossot, L'assiette au Beurre 1907.

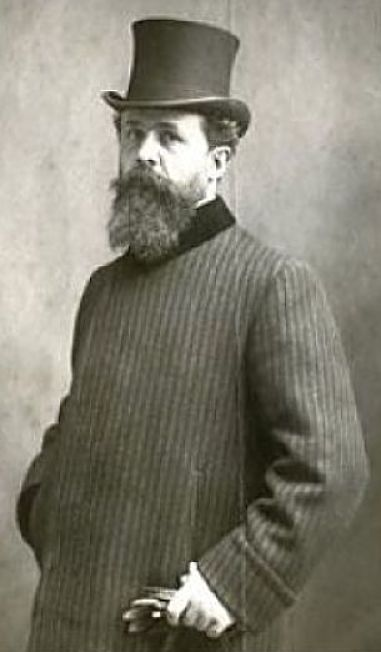
Henri Gustave Jossot
