= André Hellé =

French artist (1871–1945)

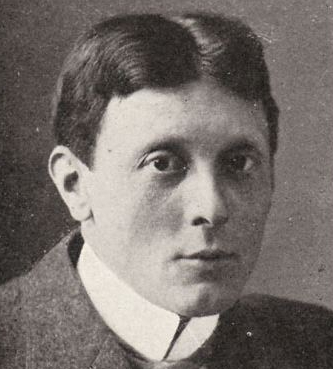
André Hellé (1910s)

André Laclôtre, known by the pseudonym André Hellé (16 March 1871 – 29 December 1945) was a French painter, illustrator, lithographer, and toy designer.

== Life and work ==
He was born in Paris. Hs father was a pharmacist, and he grew up in the Parisian suburb of Boissy-Saint-Léger. In the 1890s, after initially studying the piano, he decided in favor of art and began creating humorous drawings, inspired by a short-lived art movement known as the "Incoherents". He took the name André Hellé around 1896, when his drawings and comic strips were first published professionally.

Much in demand, he found himself very busy until well into the 1930s. His works for an adult audience were published in Le Journal pour tous (1899–1905), La Caricature (1900–1904), Le Rire (1901–1915), Le Sourire (1902–1930), L'Assiette au Beurre (1903–1910), le Journal amusant (1910–1914), Je sais tout (1909–1912), Nos loisirs (1909–1912), La Vie parisienne (1909–1920), and Le Monde Illustré (1932–1937). He also contributed to the children's magazines, La Joie des Enfants and Le Jeudi de la Jeunesse.

Beginning in 1910, he designed and created wooden toys, including a series called "Noah's Ark". He also devised games and, together with his wife, designed children's play rooms. His work earned him a gold medal and diploma of honor from the Société d'encouragement à l'art et à l'industrie. In 1913, he wrote a ballet scenario for Claude Debussy, based on one of his own children's books, called La Boîte à Joujoux (The Toy Box). Debussy composed a piano score but, due to World War I, production was delayed until 1919, after Debussy's death.

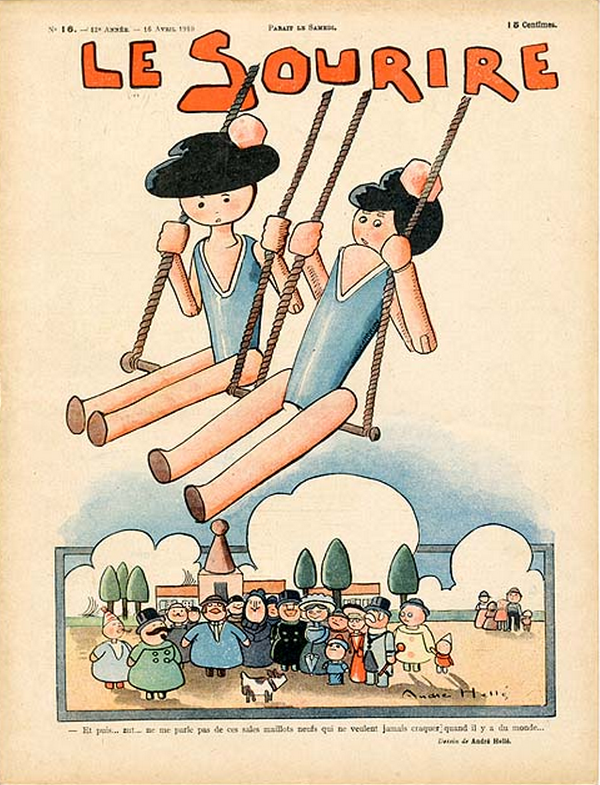
Le Sourire, cover from 16 April 1910

In the late 1920s, he did decorative work at several summer camps and schools. He was a regular participant in the Salon des Humoristes, and the Salon d'Automne, where he oversaw the book section. In 1942, he completed his memoirs, Les Souvenirs d'un Petit Garçon, covering what he describes as an extended childhood. He died in Paris in 1945.

From 2012 to 2013, the Musée du Jouet (Toy Museum) in Poissy held a retrospective of his work. In 2015, the municipal library in Boissy-Saint-Léger was named after him.

== Sources ==
- Selected works and commentary @ Les Amis d'André Hellé website
- "André Hellé, illustre et inconnu" by Jacques Desse @ Ricochet
