= Marcel Lempereur-Haut =

Belgian painter

Rhythm on two hearts Painting (oil on canvas) by Marcel Lempereur-Haut

Marcel Lempereur-Haut (1898, Liège – 1986, Lille) was a Belgian painter. He took drawing lessons at the Liège Academy of Fine Arts where he obtained a diploma in surveying and, after World War I he worked as a technical draughtsman.

In 1920, he joined the group publishing the Anthologie art magazine. He started his artistic career by producing book illustrations and prints, mostly inspired by cubism. He produced his first abstract art in 1921, and in 1922 befriended František Kupka. From 1932, he participated in the exhibitions of the musicalist artists.

He lived in Paris from 1945 to 1958, and participated in the exhibitions of the Salon des Réalités Nouvelles. At this stage, his work mainly comprised combinations of circles, spirals and stars. His later works were mostly decorative.

Lempereur-Haut continued to paint into at least his late seventies, limiting himself to crayons on cardboard after a cataract operation in 1976 restricted his vision. A retrospective exhibition of his work was held in Lille in 1985.
