= La Calotte =

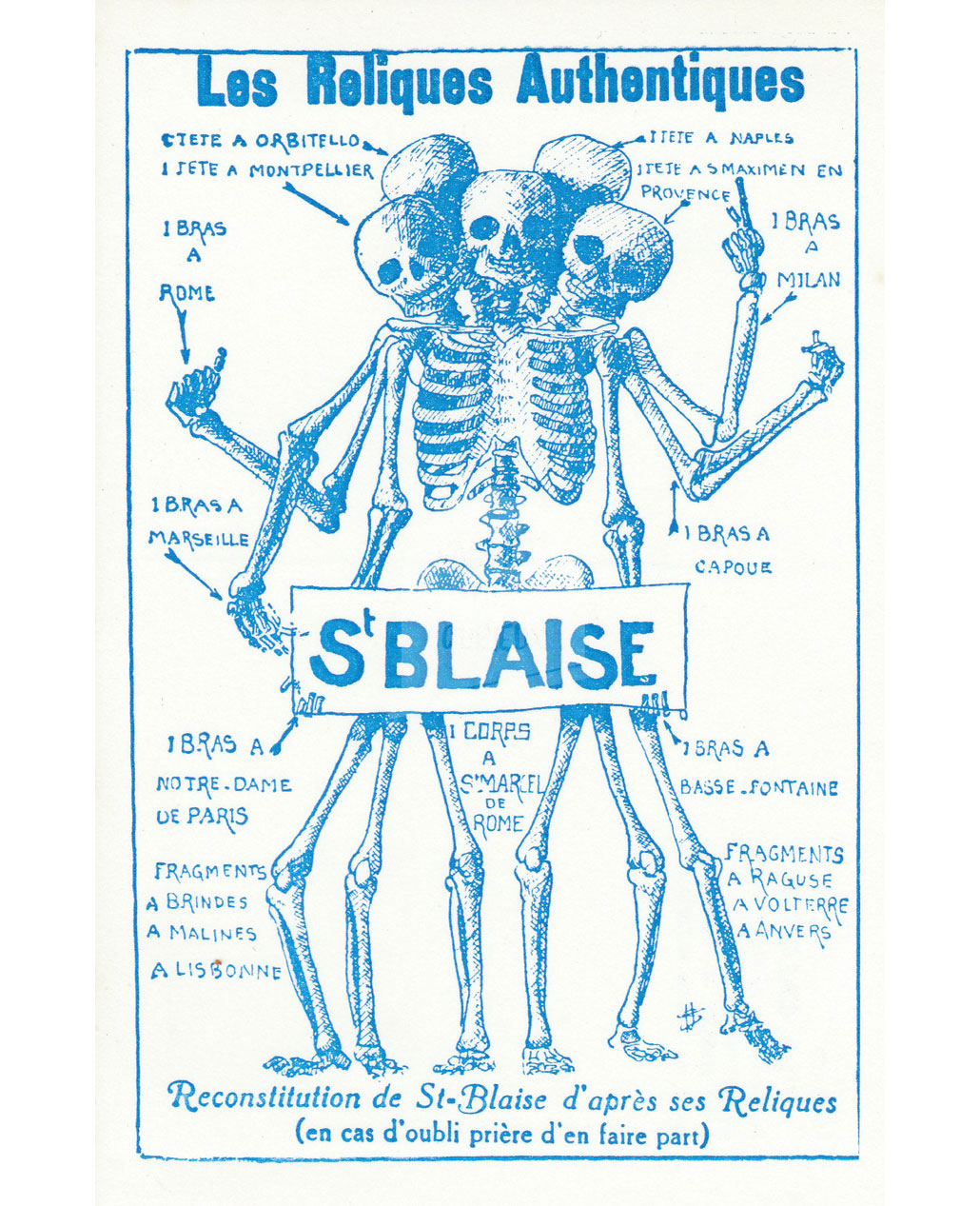
"The Authentic Relics" - La Calotte mocks the supposed relics of Saint Blaise, scattered in various locations, of which several full-fledged skeletons could have been constructed.

La Calotte is a French illustrated satirical anticlerical weekly publication, which appeared in France from 1906 to 1912. Afterwards the title was resumed from 1930 to the present day, with a change of name under the German occupation of France.

== La Calotte (1906-1911) ==
It was founded in Paris by Louis Grenêche, a publisher, in the context of the 1905 French law on the Separation of the Churches and the State, during the troubles caused by the Inventories. A powerful anticlerical wave then agitated France.

La Calotte appeared every week on 16 pages, half of which was illustrated with anti-clerical satirical drawings. The rest consisted of texts, songs, jokes, denouncing clericalism.

The designers were Saint-Fourien, Asmodée, A. Mac or Chérubin.

In its first issue of 14 September 1906, the editorial explains:

You can see, dear readers, the fighting character of La Calotte. We have but one weapon: laughter, the only weapon feared by the soldiers of Tartuffe, is to tell you that we shall not lack enemies who will try to stifle us by all means. If you share our opinion, dear readers, insist on kiosks and newsagents, which are our only sellers, so that they display us in good place. You will support our cause as well.

== Resumption of title after 1930 ==
Libertarian activist and free thinker André Lorulot took over this title in the 1930s. The designers who worked there were Armangeol (Armand Gros) who produced comic Bibles, satirical Lives of Jesus and History of the Popes illustrated with satirical drawings.

During the 1939-1945 war, La Calotte changed its title to La Vague, still under the direction of Lorulot, who stigmatized the ties between the Catholic Church and fascism. La Vague denounces antisemitism.

After the war La Calotte became the organ of La Libre Pensee. It was a monthly publication from November 1945 on.

After the death of André Lorulot, H. Perrodo-Le Moyne became its director (May 1963). He writes articles and draws under the signature of P. Le M.

The title still exists on subscription.

== La Calotte of Marseille ==
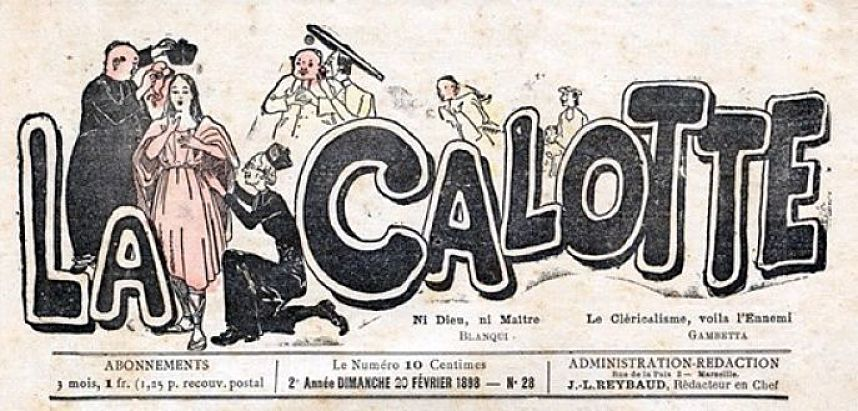
La Calotte (Marseille), No. 28, February 20, 1898.

Another satirical weekly of the same name was published in Marseilles, between 1897 and 1906, with a pause between 1903 and 1905.

== See also ==
- Didier Dubucq and his journal Les Corbeaux (1904-1909)
- Anti-clericalism
- Freethought

== Bibliography ==
- Anne Cachoux, Christian Delporte, La Calotte, mémoire de maîtrise sous la direction de René Rémond, Paris X, Nanterre, 1980
- Guillaume Doizy, À bas la calotte ! La caricature anticléricale et la séparation des Églises et de l’État, Alternatives, 2005, (ISBN 2862274593)
- Michel Dixmier, Jacqueline Lalouette, Didier Pasamonik, La République et l’Église. Images d’une querelle, Paris, La Martinière, 2005
- René Rémond, L'Anticléricalisme en France de 1815 à nos jours, Paris, Fayard, 1976, pages 186 et suivantes.
