= Outsert =

Supplemental advertisement wrapped around a publication

An outsert is a supplemental leaflet or card wrapped around and attached to the outside of a magazine or other publication -- unlike an insert, which appears inside the magazine itself -- in order to advertise a product. Outserts may range from a few pages to dozens, sometimes as large as a separate magazine. An outsert may also act as a flag for the publication to distinguish it from other titles on newsstand shelves. The effect is to draw the attention of the browser to the magazine.

Advertisers are frequently drawn to outserts because of the perceived "halo effect" of their ad being bundled with the magazine, while magazines use them as an additional revenue source.

== History ==
They were later popularized by fashion magazines in the early 1990s: Vanity Fair included an outsert for Calvin Klein, and Details included one for Request jeans. The October 1992 issue of Vogue was packaged with an outsert advertisement for Revlon. This outsert was deliberately designed to mimic the Vogue graphic design, with photoshoots by Vogue photographers, which sparked controversy amid those who saw it as blurring advertising and editorial.

== Other uses ==
An additional use of the term outsert is a multi-folded, instruction sheet applied to the outside of a bottle or carton of a pharmaceutical product. The instruction sheets are rather large and the font of the text is small so as to provide all mandated information about the proper use of and warnings about the product. The equipment that applies the outsert is called an outserter or outserting machine.

=== Scientific use of the term ===
High-strength magnets such as those at the National High Magnetic Field Laboratory are configured with an inner magnet called the insert and an outer magnet called the outsert.
