= Jack Abeillé =

French painter and illustrator

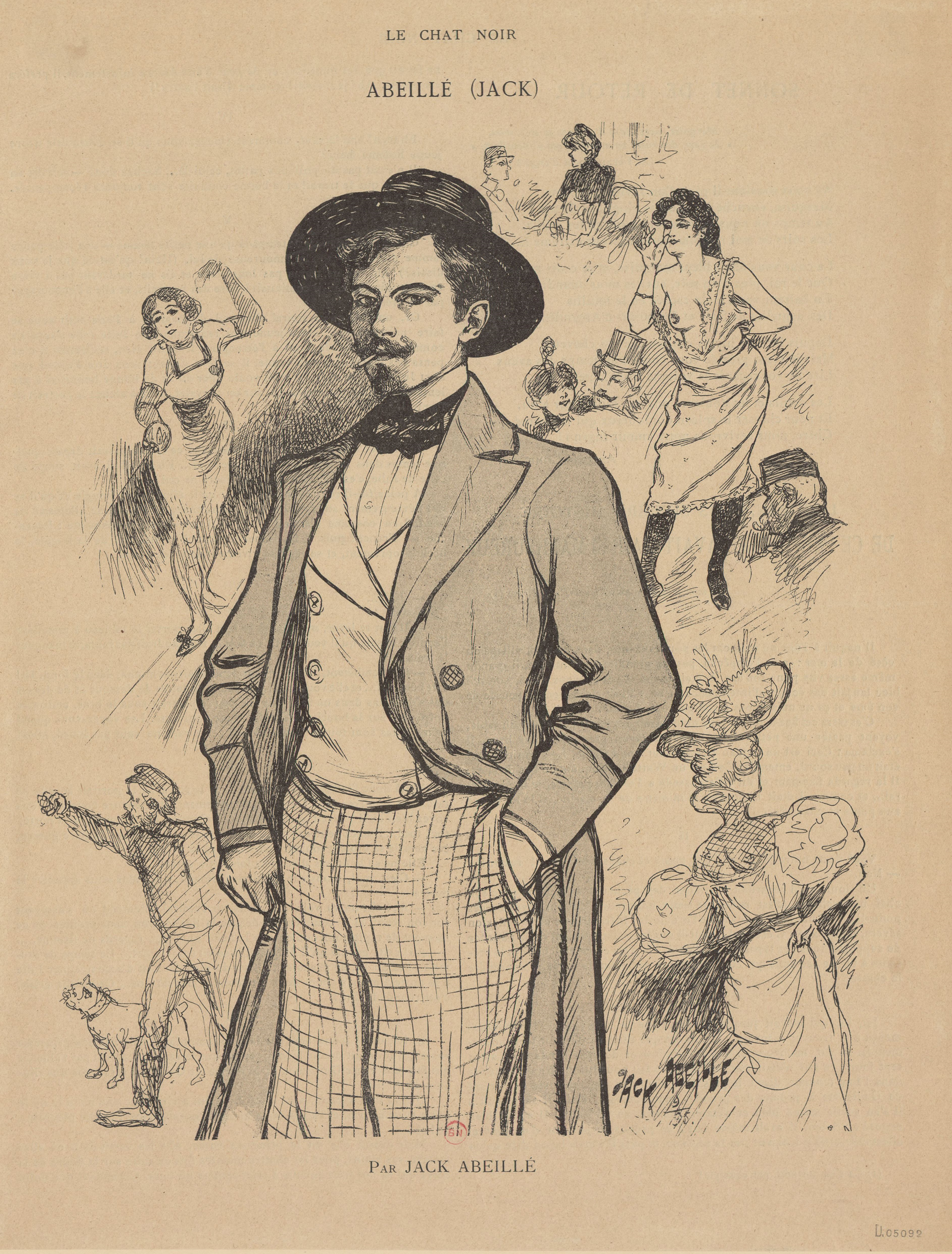
Self-portrait in Le Chat Noir (c. 1890s)

Jacques Abeillé (28 May 1873 – 25 March 1939), known as Jack Abeillé, was a French painter, poster designer, draughtsman, and illustrator.

== Life ==
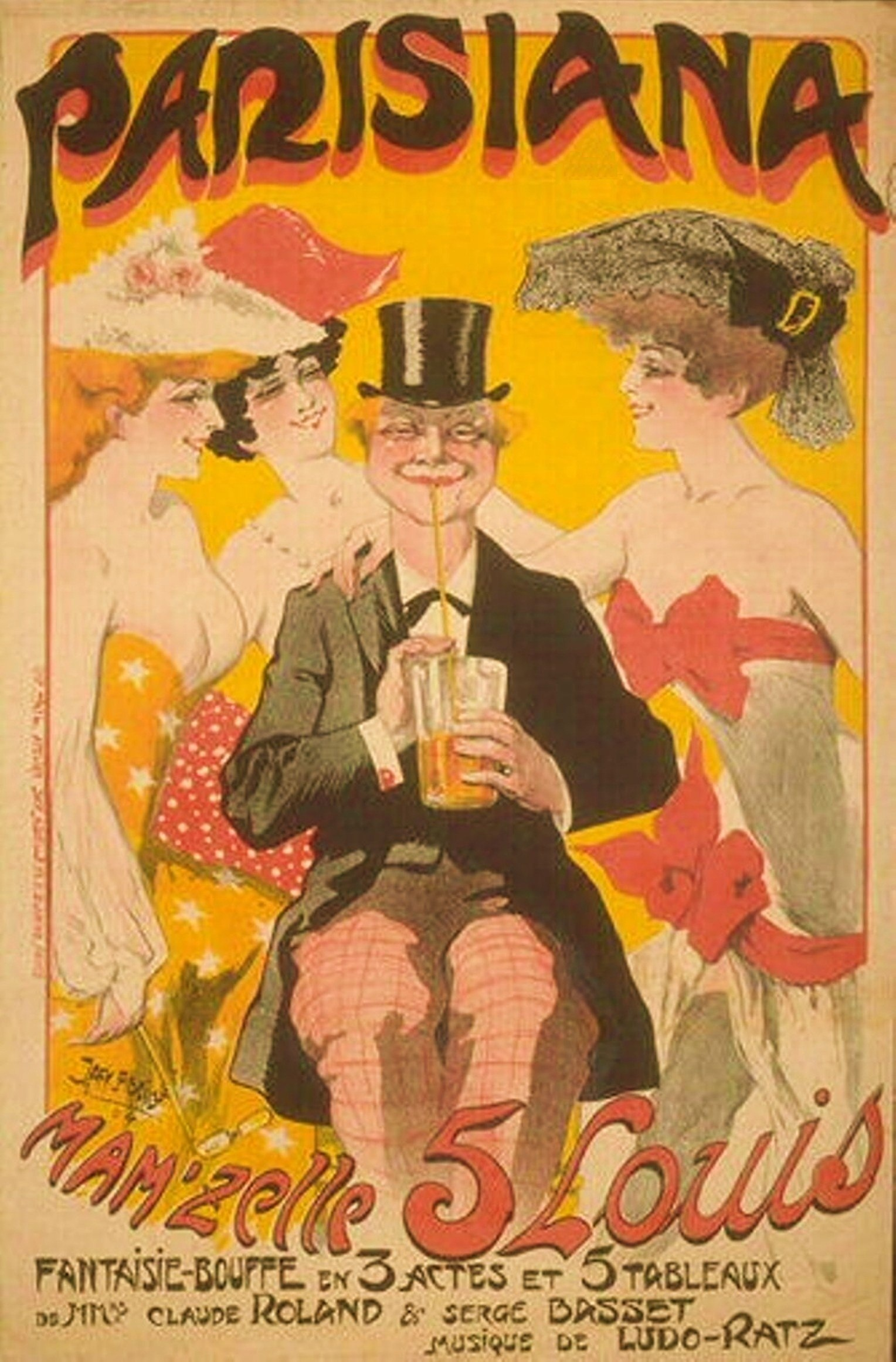
Parisiana (1904)

Jacques Abeillé was born on either 27 or 28 May 1873 in La Varenne-Saint-Hilaire, the son of Pierre Fernand Abeillé by his wife Émilie Augustine Lechap. Both of his parents were painters.

Taking the pseudonym "Jack Abeillé", he made his debut as an illustrator in the magazine La Caricature and La Chronique amusante in 1891. Three years later, he replaced Paul Balluriau as artistic director of the magazine Fin de Siècle founded by the financier François Mainguy. In 1912, he was appointed editor of a new review called Élégances.

Until 1914, his contributions as a press illustrator were numerous: his signature can be found in the Almanach Vermot, L'Amour, L'Assiette au Beurre, Comœdia, Le Frou-frou, Heures littéraires, Jean-qui-rit, Le Journal de Paris, Le Journal pour tous, Lisez-moi bleu, Mois Gai, Mon beau livre, Nos loisirs, Pages folles, Parisiana, Le Pêle-mêle, Le Petit Bleu, Rabelais, Ridendo, Le Rire (from 1894), La Semaine de Suzette, Le Sourire, Touche à tout, L'Univers illustré, La Vie en rose, and Zig-Zag.

During this period, he composed a few posters (he had a very active workshop), exhibited his pen drawings and watercolours at the Salon des humoristes, and seems to have been close to the designer Henri de Sta, Joze Dobrski de Jastzebiec (1861–1933) known as "Victor Joze", and the playwright Léon Valbert. In addition to the press, he worked for publishers. Most notably, he was one of the illustrators of the Modern-bibliothèque ("Modern Library") collection launched by Arthème Fayard and the Maison Quantin. In a more discreet way, he was the author of erotic illustrations for works sold by subscription.

After 1918, we find his signature in periodicals such as La Grimace, Le Sans-Gêne, the Journal amusant, and Parisiana. His last works seem to have appeared in 1935 and 1936, for book publishers; we find his signature at the same time in Police magazine.

=== Death ===
Jack Abeillé died on 25 March 1939 in the 18th arrondissement of Paris.

== Works ==
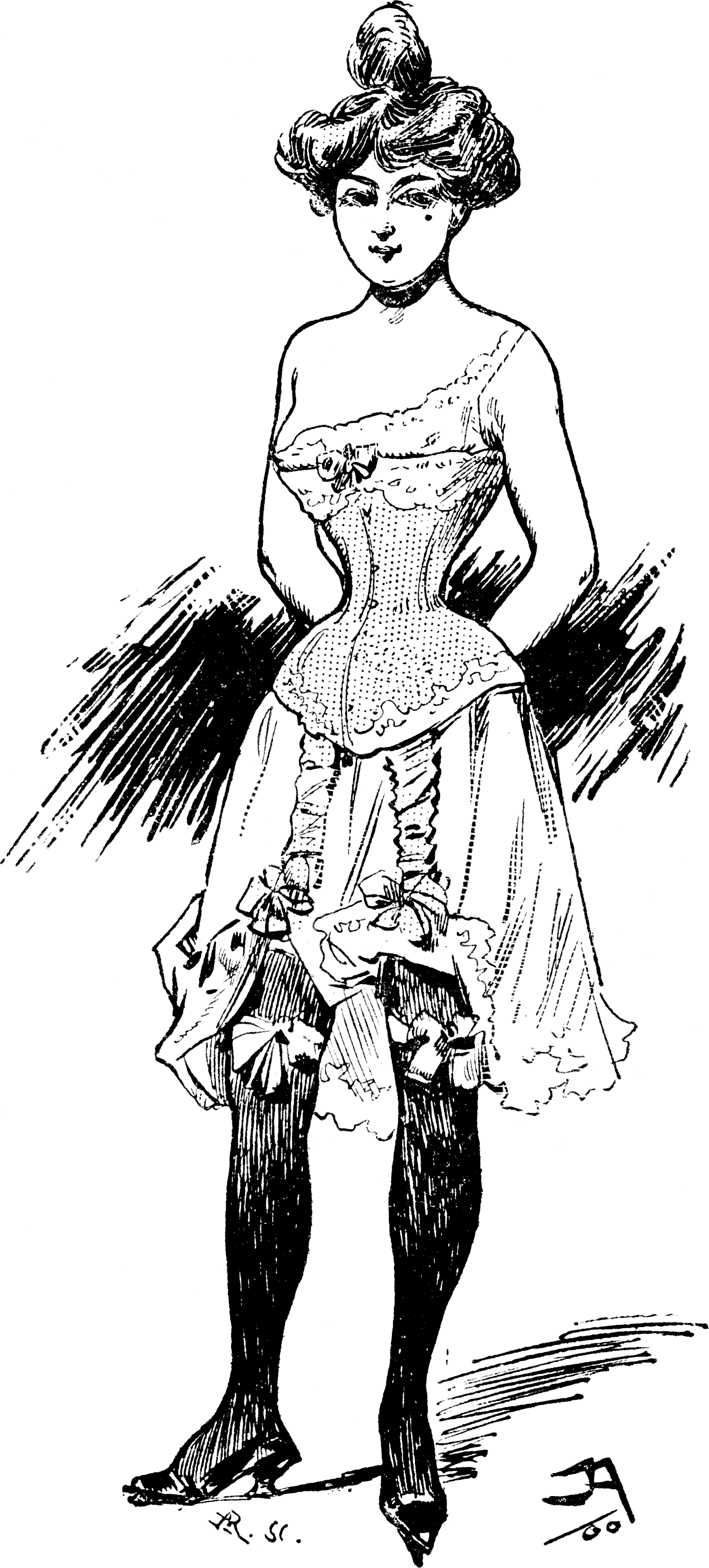
Le Frou-Frou (1900)

=== Posters ===
- Cabaret de l'âne rouge (1898)
- Le Monde où l'on s'ennuie, for the play by Édouard Pailleron (Comédie-Française, 1898)
- Biscuits Pernod Petit-Beurre Gamin (1900)
- Cottereau & Cie Dijon (1902)
- T'en auras, revue-soirée en 3 actes – Parisiana (several versions, 1903)
- Parisiana, Vénus à Paris (1904)
- Le Fou-Frou – Les Rentrées (1905)
- Ba-ta-clan. Faut voir ça! (1907)
- Flanelle Rema Tissu hygiénique (1913)
- Cherry-Brandy Copenhagen (n.d.)

=== Illustrated works ===
- Jeanne de Coulomb, Ce gamin de Panpan! (Paris: Société Française d'Éditions d'Art, 1900)
- André Delcamp, Chocho de l'Académie française: roman, illustrations by Abeillé (Paris: Albin Michel, c. 1900)
- Daniel Riche, En marge de la censure, illustrations by Douhin, Abeillé, and Neumont (Paris: Ernest Flammarion, 1901)
- Henri Sébille, Toute la troupe, morsures et caresses, decorated with 125 sketches (Paris: A. Méricant, 1903)
- Berthe Baraduc, Le voyage de Brizi-Brizi (Paris: Hachette, 1931)

=== Theatre ===
- Jacques Yvel, Des Verges pour…, one-act comedy (1908)
