= A. C. Michael =

Welsh painter and illustrator

- Born: Arthur Cadwgan Michael; 23 June 1881; Swansea, Wales
- Died: 29 June 1965 (aged 84); Guernsey
- Education: Swansea College of Art
- Known for: Painting, Illustration
- Spouse: Constance Rosling

Arthur Cadwgan Michael (23 June 1881 ‒ 29 June 1965) was a Welsh painter and illustrator.

== Early life ==
Michael was born in Swansea. His father was a commercial traveller, later a hotelier in Merthyr Tydfil.

Michael studied at Penydarren School and Swansea College of Art, at the time the School of Science and Art. He also studied in Paris.

== Work ==
Michael worked extensively as a magazine illustrator, first for periodicals in France, such as L'Assiette au Beurre, then the London Magazine, Pall Mall Magazine and Black and White. During the First World War, Michael produced a range of illustrations for the Illustrated London News.

Michael also produced a very considerable quantity of book illustrations, including illustrating his own book, An Artist in Spain, a travelogue published in 1914. Michael illustrated works by Arthur Conan Doyle, H Rider Haggard, Robert Louis Stevenson and J M Barrie and for H. G. Wells' The War in the Air and The Outline of History.

In the interwar period, Michael produced poster art for rail companies such as the London and North Eastern Railway and the London, Midland and Scottish Railway. His art was used on a range of posters for destinations such as Edinburgh, the Belgian Coast, Scarborough, Whitley Bay, Lowestoft, the Norfolk Broads and St Andrews. After nationalisation he was commissioned by British Railways. He also painted portraits associated with his adopted home of Guernsey.

== Personal life ==
Between 1903 and 1916 Michael lived in the Bedford Park area of Chiswick in West London.

Michael married Constance Rosling in 1905 but the marriage ended in divorce in 1911.
