= Louise Janin =

American painter

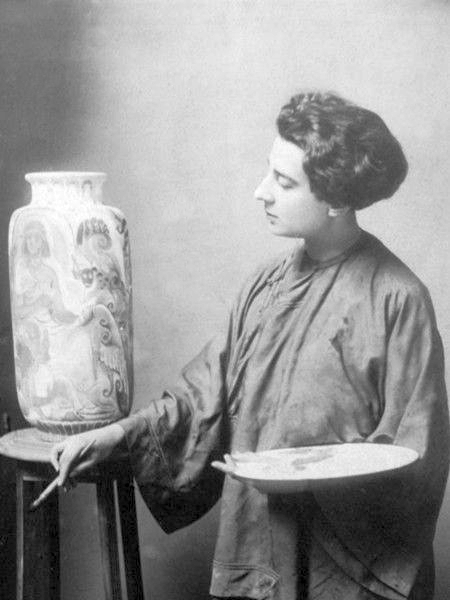
- Louise Janin in 1924
- Born: August 29, 1893; Durham, New Hampshire
- Died: 1997 (aged 103–104); Meudon, France
- Education: California School of Fine Arts
- Known for: Painting
- Movement: Symbolism, Orientalism, Musicalism

Louise Janin (August 29, 1893, Durham, New Hampshire – 1997, Meudon) was an American painter who settled in Paris in 1923. Her work relates to symbolism and musicalism (the attempt to interpret music in painting).

== Biography ==
Louise Janin was born in Durham, to a well-off family of French descent. Her father had put together a rich collection of Asian art. After the remarriage of her mother at the beginning of the 20th century, she lived in San Francisco, witnessing the earthquake of 1906. Demonstrating from early childhood "dispositions for drawing, theater and music", it was in painting that she decided to educate herself.

After attending courses at the California School of Fine Arts in San Francisco from 1911 to 1914 and William Merritt Chase's last summer class in Carmel-by-the-Sea, she took a long trip through Asia, then made her first canvases inspired by Buddhist, Hindu and Taoist mythologies. In 1921, she stayed in New York and participated in various exhibitions, pursuing work influenced by Far Eastern spirituality. Two years later, she went to Europe and settled permanently in Paris.

She participated in the 1920s in the Salon des Orientalistes, in the Union of Women Painters and Sculptors Fair, in the International Exhibition of Modern Decorative and Industrial Arts in 1925, in the Paris Colonial Exposition in 1931, and in the Salon des Tuileries. Personal exhibitions took place in 1924 at the Galerie Bernheim-Jeune, then four years later at the Galerie Georges Petit. In 1924 the National Museum of Franco-American Cooperation at Château de Blérancourt acquired the canvas entitled Le dragon. It is at that time that her figurative paintings began to acquire abstract decorative motifs.

Through the poet and art critic Alexandre Mercereau, she was introduced to two significant artists, František Kupka and Henry Valensi. In 1932, she joined the musicalist movement at the request of Henry Valensi and participated in almost all of the group's events. At the onset of the Second World War, she was living in Corsica, and subsequently interned in a camp in Italy. After the war, her work became increasingly abstract. She was an exhibitor at the Salon des Réalités Nouvelles, then at the Salon Comparaisons. It was during the 1950s that she invented a new artistic process, a mixed technique on paper, a variation of the marbling technique that led to original works visualizing the sacred in cosmic visions, which she called "cosmogrammes".

Louise Janin continued to exhibit regularly at the Salon of Sacred Art, at the Salon of Women Painters and Sculptors, at the Salon d'Automne and at the Salon des Indépendants, offering works incorporating symbolism, musicality and spirituality, mixing figuration and abstraction.

== Bibliography ==
- Jean-Jacques Lévêque, Louise Janin, Paris, Isthar, 1959.
- Elie-Charles Flamand, Janin, Paris, Galerie Hexagramme, 1974.
- Nicole Lamothe and Monique Marmatcheva, Louise Janin, témoin du siècle, Paris, Galerie 1900-2000, 1993
