= Károly Józsa =

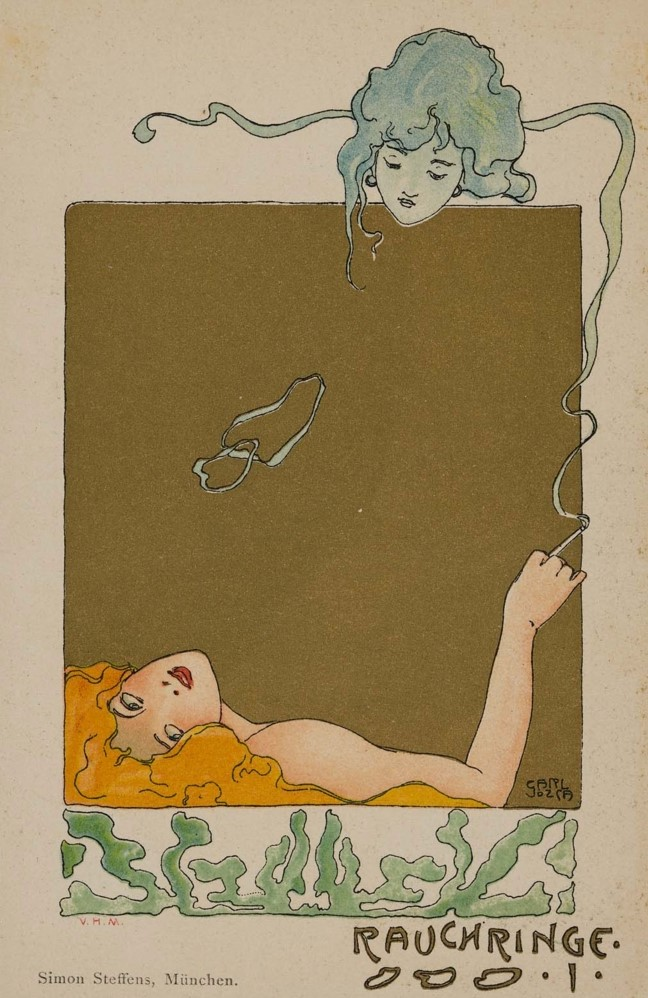
"Smoke Rings" (first in a series)

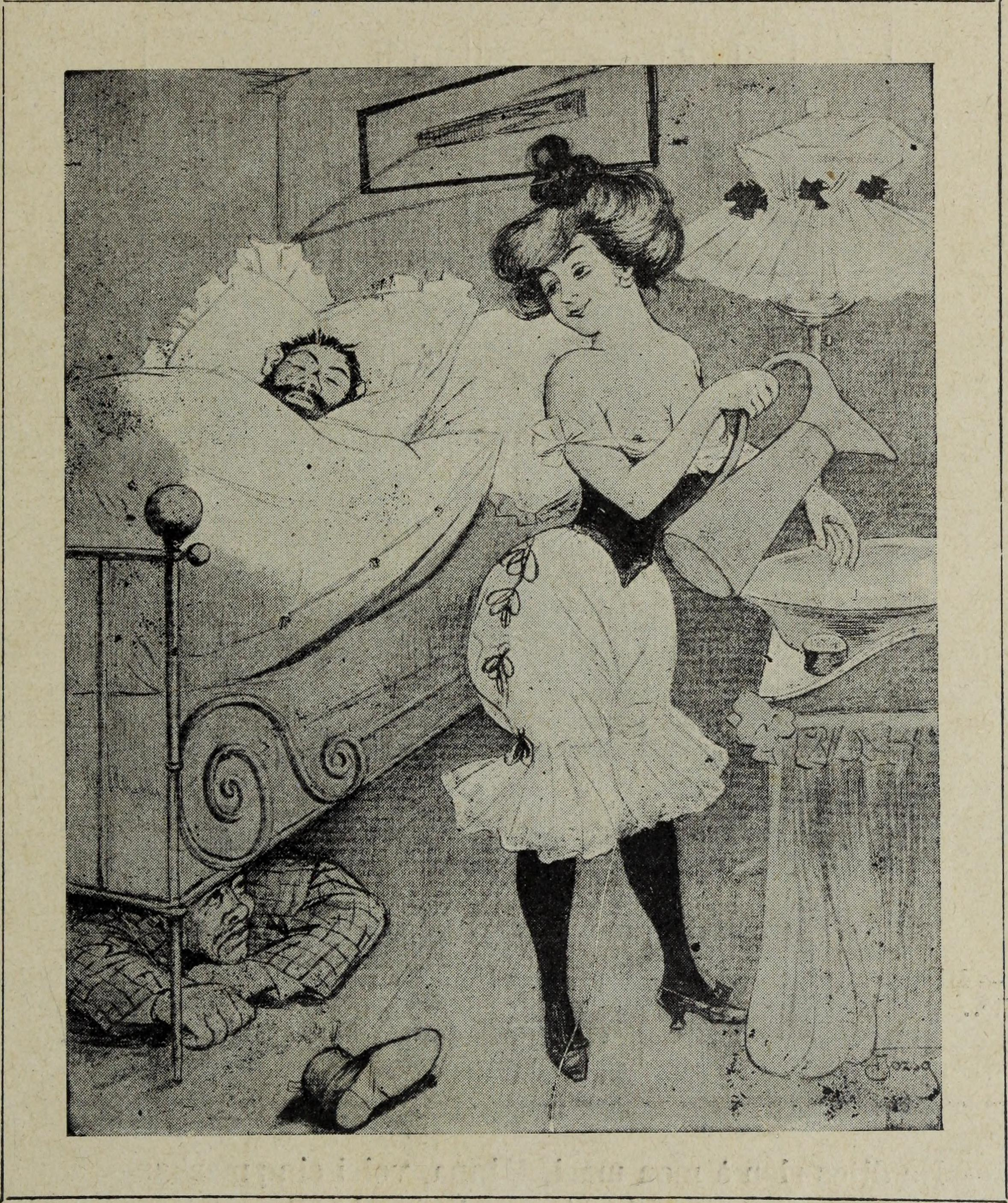
From the series "Images galantes et esprit de l'etranger"

Károly Józsa, born Károly Albert Jakobovits (16 December 1872, Szeged - 20 August 1929, Budapest) was a Hungarian designer, engraver, and illustrator of Jewish ancestry.

== Biography ==
He began his studies at the Academy of Fine Arts Vienna, where his primary instructor was Christian Griepenkerl, then at the private school of Anton Ažbe in Munich.

During his studies, he became friends with his fellow artist, Raphael Kirchner. Together, they went to Paris where they became involved in the picture postcard business. They created several hundred different designs, in the Art Nouveau style, mainly featuring young, slightly undressed women, often with an Orientalist theme. Much of their work foreshadowed the "pin-up" style which gained great popularity during World War I.

Kirchner continued to design postcards throughout his career but, after a short time, Józsa enrolled at the Académie Julian to study engraving. In 1906, he held an exhibit at the Salon d'automne, featuring wood engravings inspired by the American Plains Indians. That same year, he worked with Kirchner for the last time, jointly producing an issue of the satirical magazine, L'Assiette au Beurre

In 1908, he won a gold medal for a poster, entered in a contest held by The Studio, an art magazine based in London. After the beginning of World War I, he travelled throughout Northern Europe but, in 1915, decided to open a studio in Budapest.

His works may be seen at the Clark Art Institute, the Fine Arts Museum of San Francisco and the Hungarian National Gallery.
