= Ernest La Jeunesse =

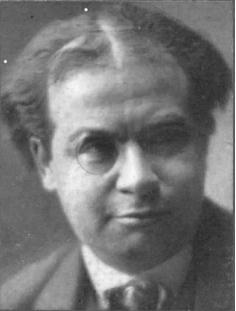
- Born: 23 June 1874
- Died: 2 May 1917 (aged 42)
- Resting place: Montrouge Cemetery
- Occupations: writer; caricaturist; literary critic
- Awards: Knight of the Légion d'honneur

Ernest Léon Lajeunesse-Caën, better known as Ernest La Jeunesse (23 June 1874 – 2 May 1917) was a French writer, caricaturist, and literary critic.

== Career ==
Ernest Léon Lajeunesse-Caën was born to Désiré Caën and Céline Feize on 23 June 1874.

In 1896, after receiving his licence ès lettres (the equivalent of a B.A.), he joined La Revue blanche where he reviewed plays, allying himself with modern writers like Oscar Wilde. He wrote and sometimes drew for Le Figaro, Gil Blas, L'Assiette au beurre, la Revue bleue, La Phalange, L'Intransigeant, Le Journal de Paris. He was also the French correspondent for Die Zeit in Vienna. He excelled in the art of pastiche and had an excellent sense of humor.

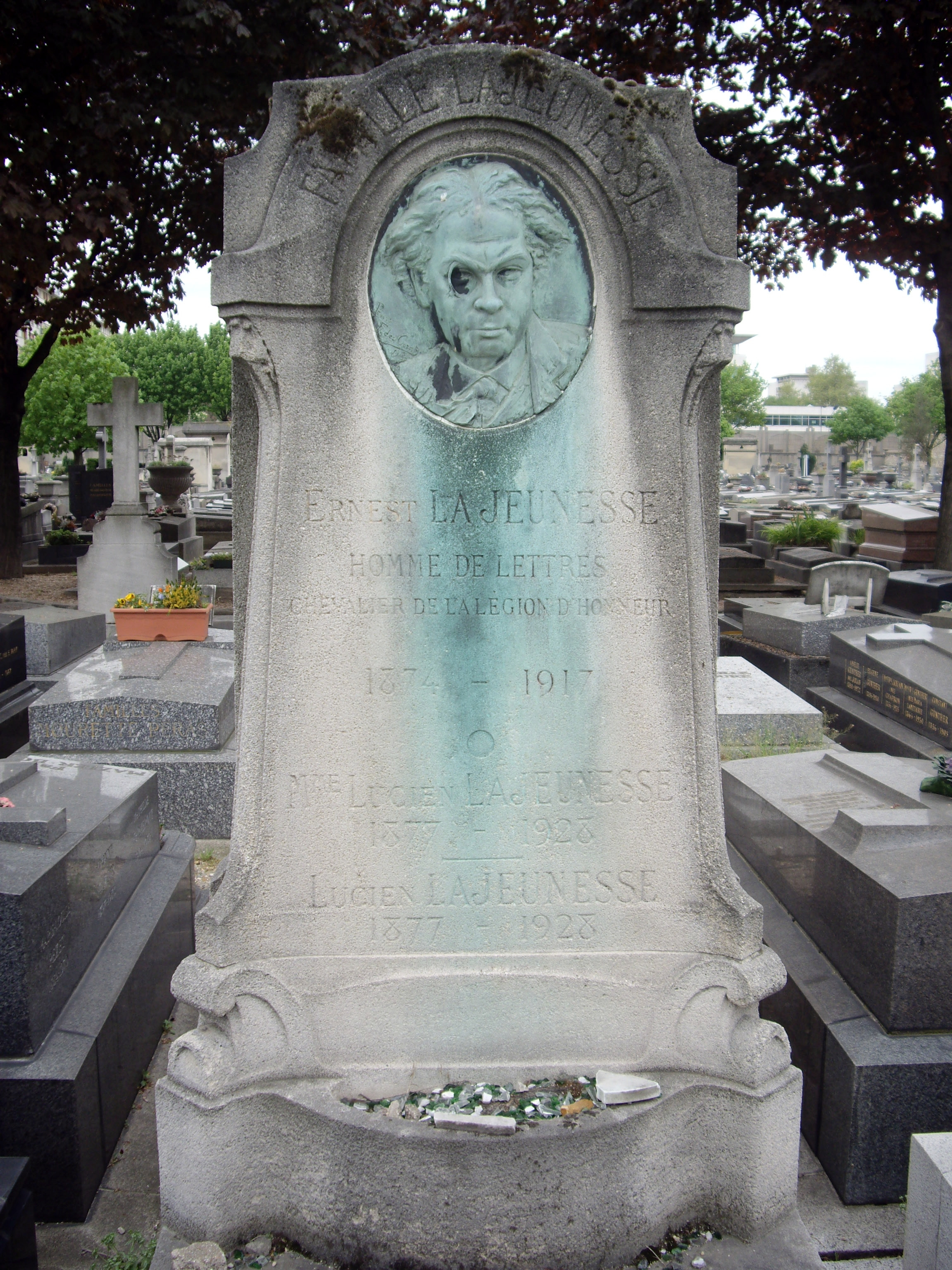
Tomb at Montrouge Cemetery.

In 1906, Guillaume Apollinaire, who appreciated his work, introduced him to Max Jacob. Other great witnesses of the era, such as Paul Léautaud and Jules Renard, discuss La Jeunesse, not always in positive terms; later André Billy would cite him as one of the great chroniclers of his times.

He strove from a very early age to become a playwright, without believing too much in his abilities. However, his dramatic work was defended by Octave Mirbeau who, always quick to defend the underdog, could not tolerate the targeting of a talented young man because of his physical appearance. La Jeunesse had a falsetto voice, and dressed eccentrically. He was caricatured kindly by Alfred Jarry in the character of "Allmensch Severus" in Les Jours et les Nuits. Having discovered his Jewish origins, Léon Daudet called him "a scarecrow" in his Au temps de Judas. According to Edmond de Goncourt, many of his contemporaries feared his viper's tongue and the delicate wickedness of his irony.

In 1907, Bosc et Cie published his novel, Le Forçat honoraire, roman immoral, which is narrated by an assassin. In his preface, La Jeunesse attacks the genre of detective literature which had just started to flourish, with its detectives, supermen who always punish the wicked, a literature which "puts one to sleep," with its two-dimensional heroes who are always partisans of the bourgeoisie.

He was the drama critic at Le Journal starting February 1909.

He died at 66, rue des Plantes in the 14th arrondissement of Paris on 2 May 1917. He is buried at the cimetière de Montrouge.

== Awards and honours ==
Sponsored by his friend Georges Courteline, he was named Knight of the Légion d'honneur on 30 July 1914, the eve of the declaration of World War I.
