= Raymond Renefer =

French painter

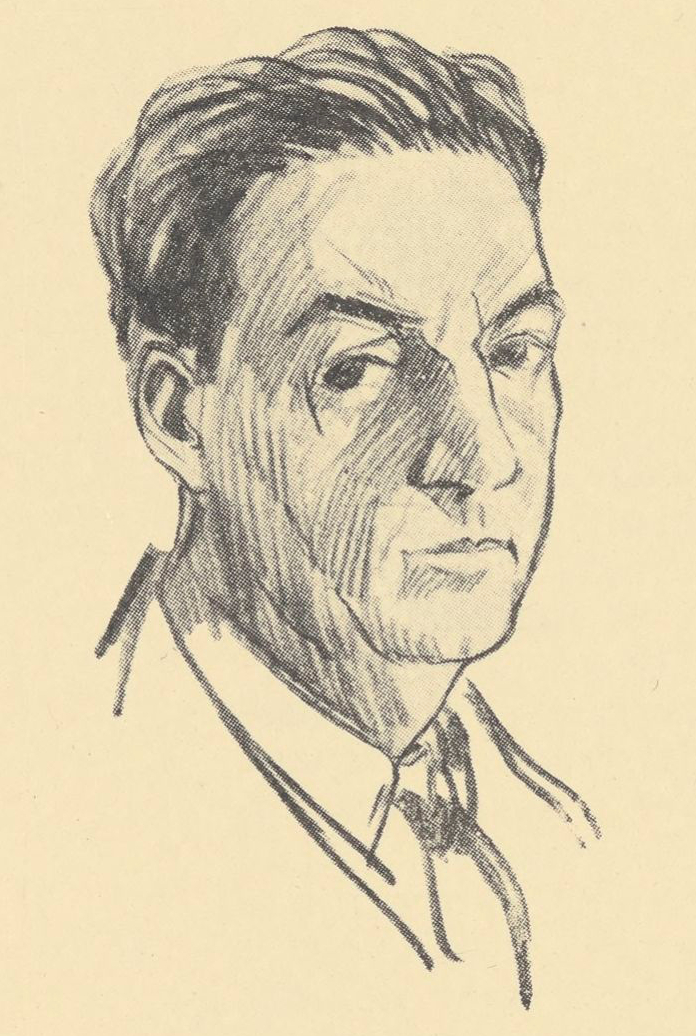
- Self-portrait of Raymond Renefer
- Born: Jean-Constant-Raymond Fontanet; 2 June 1879; Bétheny, France
- Died: 14 October 1957 (aged 78); Andrésy, France
- Known for: Painting, drawing

Jean-Constant-Raymond Fontanet (2 June 1879 – 14 October 1957), known by his pseudonym of Raymond Renefer, was a French painter, illustrator and engraver artist.

== Early life ==
Renefer was a student at the École des Beaux-Arts de Paris after studying architecture. Diring this time, he adapted the pseudonym Renéférant, which later he shortened to Renefer. He began to paint around 1900 and exhibited from 1910 at the Salon des Indépendants in Paris. He married Yvonne Yvon in 1907.

== First World War ==
Renefer was conscripted during World War I in the French 1er Régiment du Génie (Note: 1st Engineer Regiment.) and drew schemes of battlefields, which won him the Croix de guerre in 1918. In the meantime Renefer sketched the life on the battlefields and the devastated landscapes. Two portfolios of 15 etchings depicting the Verdun and the Somme frontlines were created in 1916. In 1918, Renefer illustrated the first edition of the novel Le Feu by Henri Barbusse. An exhibition about this period was held at the National WWI Museum and Memorial of Kansas City in 2014–2015.

== From 1920 to 1957 ==
Renefer created in 1922 49 etchings for Le Cabaret by Alexandre Arnoux. He illustrated more than a hundred novels published by Fayard.

After living in the west of Paris (7th/15th/16th districts), he bought a house at the end of the 1930s in the small town of Andrésy 20 km west of Paris. This new home at the confluence of the Seine and Oise rivers inspired Renefer for his waterside paintings or watercolors, most of them located in Andrésy, Paris or Conflans-Sainte-Honorine. An exhibition was held in 1931 at the Parisian Javal et Bourdeaux gallery including 51 oil paintings

He was also from 1927 director of the art books at the book publisher Flammarion and teacher at the ABC art school in Paris from 1925 to 1957.

He died in October 1957 at the age of 78 and is buried in the new cemetery of Andrésy overlooking the river Seine.

== Works in museums ==
Many museums in France own works by Renefer, including the Musée de l'Île-de-France in Sceaux, the Parisian Musée de l'Armée , the Musée Carnavalet, and the Musée de la Grande Guerre in Meaux...

== Pupils ==
- Jean Feugereux (1923–1992)
- Claude Naudin (1915–2007)
