= Supplement (publishing) =

Supplemental advertisement included with a publication

Supplements in the publishing industry are separately bound publications and may encompass frank advertising in newspapers, concealed advertising in academic journals, supplemental educational materials in textbooks, or extra volumes in reference works.

== In newspapers ==
Advertising supplements periodically accompany corresponding newspapers and are prepared by the paper's advertising staff instead of its editorial staff. It is common for them to cover topics such as real estate and automobiles on behalf of the paper's frequent advertisers. Some supplements are spin-offs from a newspaper. They are sold separately and typically cover a specific topic, such as the Times Literary Supplement and the Times Educational Supplement.

== In academic journals ==
In academic publishing, some journals publish supplements, which often either cover an industry-funded conference or are "symposia" on a given topic. These supplements are often subsidized by an external sponsor. Such supplements can have guest editors, are often not peer-reviewed to the same standard as the journal itself, and are more likely to use promotional language. Many journals do not publish sponsored supplements, but small-circulation journals are more likely to publish supplements than large, high-prestige journals. Such supplements create conflicts of interest in academic publishing. Externally sponsored journal supplements have been discussed as a potential source of bias and conflict of interest in academic publishing.

== In book publishing ==
In education, supplemental materials are educational materials designed to accompany or expand on the information presented on course textbooks. These can include printed materials, CDs, websites, or other electronic materials. Supplement volumes are used in reference works. Some are published if it's too expensive to revise the main work, such as the first edition of the Oxford English Dictionary. They can also be used as companions for up-to-date books, focusing on specific themes or areas, such as Guinness World Records: Gamer's Edition.

== See also ==
- Advertorial
- Insert (print advertising)
