= Henry Valensi =

Henry Valensi (17 September 1883 – 21 April 1960) was a French Cubist painter, animator, film director and art theoretician. He founded the musicalism movement and created La Symphonie printanière (Spring Symphony), a unique abstract animation or "cinépeinture" (film-painting), a print of which was acquired in 2013 by the Musée National d'Art Moderne in Paris and exhibited there from 23 October 2013 to 5 January 2015 (alongside seven of his paintings left to the French state) as part of its "Plural Modernities" hang. The Association Henry Valensi, made up of the artists' beneficiaries, has been managing and promoting his work since 2013.

== Biography ==
Born in Algiers, Valensi began by painting Algerian landscapes. His family moved to the 9th arrondissement of Paris in 1899 and encouraged his enthusiasm for painting. On the advice of Léon Bonnat, in 1902 Valensi joined the Académie Julian, where he studied painting under Jules Lefebvre and Tony Robert-Fleury. From 1905 Étienne Dinet allowed him to present his first exhibition at the Salon des Orientalistes. He was therefore influenced by impressionism but expressed the need to renew pictorial art by liberating the artist from the purely objective vision that practice had crystallized into immobility.

Living comfortably on an inheritance, Valensi joined the Société des Artistes Indépendants and exhibited regularly each year at their Salon from 1908 on. He traveled widely in Europe, around the perimeter of the Mediterranean and in Russia. His landscapes began to change as he added abstract art elements during a voyage to Greece in 1909. From then on he was only interested in avant-garde attempts at movement and dynamism, which he integrated into his art. He was linked to Filippo Tommaso Marinetti and Futurist painters before finding his own movement of musicalism in 1913.

In 1910 or 1911, Jacques Villon and František Kupka introduced Valensi to the chief editor of L'Assiette au beurre, a satirical review for which he provided anti-colonial, anti-capitalist, anti-clerical and anti-militarist drawings. In 1912 he, Jacques Villon, Pierre Dumont, Jean Metzinger, Albert Gleizes, Raymond Duchamp-Villon, Marcel Duchamp and Francis Picabia managed and organised the Salon de la Section d'Or. Beside Nude Descending a Staircase, No. 2 by Marcel Duchamp, Valensi hung The Air Around the Long Sawyers (now in the Musée des Beaux Arts de Lyon). From 1913 he exhibited regularly at several salons in France and abroad.

In 1932 Valensi, Charles Blanc-Gatti, Gustave Bourgogne and Vito Stracquadaini founded the Association des artistes musicalistes and organized the first of twenty-three musicalist salons at the galerie Renaissance in Paris. According to Valensi's theories, art occupied a preponderant place in the evolution of self-awareness across civilizations. Since it was science, rhythm and dynamism in the 20th century music, became the art most capable of expressing the nuances and subtleties of the human soul. Sound and color were both vibrations of matter, meaning musicalist painting used art materials (color, line, shapes) subjectively to create a "music" of color on the canvas.

Valensi considered that the last stage in the evolution of pictorial art consisted of introducing real movement into the space of the canvas, which led to "cinépeinture" produced by "cinépeintres" (film painters). From 1936 on Valensi worked almost alone, with a camera installed on a bench in a maid's room serving as a studio, elaborating La Symphonie printanière, a 30 minute abstract animated film in color, which he completed in 1959 using 64,000 drawings and based on a painting he had produced in 1932.

== As a theoretician ==
A renowned art theoretician, Valensi published several works on the evolution of the arts and their relationship to materiality. He spoke of "art matter" where sound was the composer's matter, color was the painter's matter, words were a writer's matter, and stone or marble a sculptor's matter. Valensi believed that the five arts – which he identified as sculpture, architecture, painting, literature (including poetry) and music (including dance) – were governed at any given time in history by the principals of a dominating art, which lost its materiality over time, a principle he defined as "the Law of the Predominances". By this logic, which he called "Art-Un" (One-Art), Valensi conceived an evolutionary history of Western and Mediterranean art, dominated by artistic rules such as:

- all arts in ancient Egypt were dominated by the principles of architecture, namely rigidity, colossal size and mass
- in ancient Greece and ancient Rome architecture's dominant influence gave way to that of sculpture, bringing realism, three-dimensionality, geometric precision and lightness and making all artistic canons evolve
- in the Middle Ages and the Renaissance, painting became the dominant art, with color and expressivity transforming sculpture, architecture, literature and music
- from the end of the 16th century to the mid 19th century, the dominant art was literature, setting artistic principles, as allegorical sources and multiplying literary sources dominated the academies, with most paintings of mythological, historical and literary themes coming from this period.
- at the end of the 19th century Valensi saw a certain "musicalization" or abstraction of the arts, considering Stéphane Mallarmé as the first musicalist poet, stating "Mallarmé received [the word] and, having musicalized it, gave it new symbolic senses".

Valensi saw the musicalist movement as tending fully to embody this new era as it moved towards lightness and fluidity by the musicalistion-abstraction of all the arts and of all thought. The "Artistes musicalistes" was published on 17 April 1932, for the first time in the journal Comœdia. Musicalist painting and its aesthetic principles were representative of the arts' musicalisation. They defined themselves by introducing musical properties in pictorial plasticity, by knowing movement, rhythm and space-time - color was a vibration only distinguishable from sound by its different wavelength. Valensi considered that he painted in a spiritual state similar to that of a composer, orchestrating colours on a canvas and naming what he considered to be successful works as "preludes", "fugues" or "symphonies".

In the 1910s artistic thought was considerably affected by technical progress, discovering new plastic and spatial forms. Several paintings of the time benefited from academic training, but sought to represent these new forms of reality through Cubism, Futurism and Musicalism. Valensi's musicalism was born into a world where reference to the image was completely changing, in which art impregnated these new forms of reality which were the machine, movement or reality of matter (support, colours). The most successful musicalist work was thought not to suggest rhythm or movement but to give them a real plasticity. Cinema (forty years old when Valensi created his moving painting or "cinépeinture") represented the ideal of inserting movement and giving a plastic form to time, the fourth dimension. Valensi refused to feed the debate then raging around him between art and industry and considered that his "cinépeinture" represented the perfect marriage between art, industry and science and a successful version of the "Art-Un" welcomed by all. For him, the "Art-Un" was the name for the collective of arts across the world, ruled alternately by each of its members, and in the 20th century it was ruled and guided (rather than dominated) by the principles of music.

== Symphonie printanière ==
The first attempt to produce an animated "cinépeinture" film, Symphonie printanière dated from 1936, although the idea was much older. When Valensi produced the painting of the same name in 1932, he foresaw the introduction of movement into painting. The first successful attempts at three-colour film were made in 1922 by the American company Kodachrome, but it took more than ten years to become commercially available. Thus, in 1936, Valensi began producing his "cinépeint" film with two c.1925 Pathé cameras and a projector of the same era. Mixing abstract compositions and figurative elements, the film's scenes were painted onto celluloid in oils and filmed directly. The moving elements were generated by superimposing celluloids cut into the desired shape. Valensi created the film almost alone, though the last scenes were produced in collaboration with his student Christiane Vincent-La Force, a musicalist painter forty years his junior, who ran a gallery. All the drawings for the film (paper sketches and painted celluloids) are conserved in the French film archives at the Centre national du cinéma et de l'image animée in Bois-d’Arcy. The elements on film, developed by the GTC laboratory of Joinville-le-Pont, are conserved at the studio Digimage in Montrouge.

Like a musical symphony, La Symphonie printanière was made up of five parts – a prelude, three movements and a finale. It combines chronological and thematic development - the prelude corresponds to the end of winter and the finale to the summer solstice. The three middle movements related to heaven, nature and life embodied by love respectively. The work as a whole united the properties of painting, of music (movement and rhythm) and of literature, with the composition responding to a narrative register. It includes several figurative elements such as the floral hatching or the male and female characters in the third movement. Nevertheless, the film's result is a generally abstract composition, the colours translating the emotional rendering. Passionate about psychophysics, throughout his career Valensi often lent on the study of colour as a emission of vibrations, vibrations which had an impact on the human psyche. For him, each of the seven colours in the rainbow or spectrum expressed a feeling and generated a more or less intense energy. The order in which he classified the colours was according to the energy they diffused and the feelings that they conveyed according to his plastic language - red referred to dynamism, orange to euphoria, yellow to joy, green to hope, blue to calm and indigo and violet to melancholy. The colours translate the different actions of the "cinépeint" film.

== Legacy ==
In 2013 Marie Talon produced the biography Henry Valensi, l'heure est venue…, commissioned by the rights holders for Valensi's works. It is an imaginary dialogue tracing the history of the Parisian artistic avant-garde and using unpublished documents from the archives such as Max Jacob's letters to Valensi during summer 1914 and letters showing that Valensi was often at Robert and Sonia Delaunay's home. It also drew on Claire Euzet's 1996 Sorbonne doctoral thesis Le musicalisme, une tendance de l'abstraction, on Christiane Vincent Laforce's memories (she had assisted and collaborated with Valensi from 1957 until his death) and the works of Monika Lilkov on Valensi (particularly his 2012 memoir La peinture en mouvement).

In 2014 Benoît Sapiro and Alain Le Gaillard exhibited paintings and film elements by Valensi in their galleries on rue des Beaux Arts and rue Mazarine in Paris. Since 2021 the Army Museum has acquired several of his wartime works, such as The March of the Allies, The Landing and The New Hope, Study No. 3

== Bibliography (in French) ==
- Qu'est ce que le Musicalisme ? Henry Valensi fondateur du Groupe musicaliste, Paris, galerie Drouart, 1990 - catalogue of the exhibition at the galerie Drouart
- Marie Talon, Henry Valensi, l'heure est venue…, Yvelinéditions, 2013, ISBN 9782846684507.
- Association Henry Valensi.
