= Aristide Delannoy =

French painter and caricaturist (1874–1911)

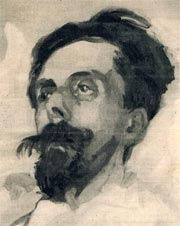
- Portrait of Delannoy by Gaston Raieter, April 1911
- Born: Aristide Grégoire Joseph Delannoy; 30 July 1874; Béthune, French Republic
- Died: 5 May 1911 (aged 36); Paris, French Republic
- Occupation: Cartoonist
- Movement: Anarchism

Aristide Delannoy (30 July 1874 – 5 May 1911) was a French painter, newspaper cartoonist, caricaturist, and anarchist.

== Biography ==
Delannoy was born in Béthune, France, to a family of watch sellers of modest means. From the age of 15, although "deaf as a stone", he was corporal of his school regiment (fr:Bataillon scolaire). Passionate about painting, he took drawing and painting classes from Pharaon de Winter at the École des beaux-arts de Lille, then, in 1897, classes at the École des beaux-arts de Paris before exhibiting at the Salon des Indépendants from 1902.

Painting did not allow him to support his family, so he turned to drawing for newspapers. An anarchist, he published in L'Assiette au Beurre from 1901, then collaborated with many anarchist and anti-militarist publications, among them Les Temps nouveaux, La Guerre sociale and Les Hommes du jour, for which he designed nearly 150 covers.

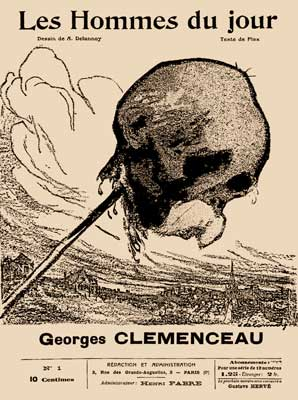
Georges Clemenceau drawn by Aristide Delannoy, Les Hommes du jour, January 1908

=== Les Hommes du jour ===
Delannoy drew Georges Clemenceau as a skull for the first edition of Hommes du jour in January 1908, following the bloody repression of the Draveil quarry workers' movement. Victor Méric wrote in the edition of Hommes du jour dedicated to Delannoy: "We were quite worried. We needed, for the first issue intended for the 'Top Cop' Clemenceau, a vigorous, acerbic, biting drawing. I had done everything possible for the text. When Delannoy, a few days later, returned with his sketch and showed us the famous skull, we jumped for joy. With a similar illustration, the issue was sure to be a success. It was a triumph. Clemenceau's Maw had a run of 25,000 and sold like hot cakes."

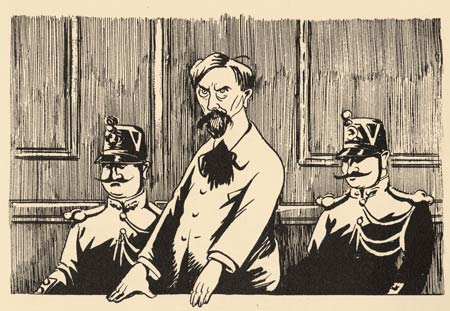
26 September 1908, Aristide Delannoy at his trial for a caricature of General Albert d'Amade dans Les Hommes du jour (drawing by Vivriès).

=== Trial, fine, imprisonment ===
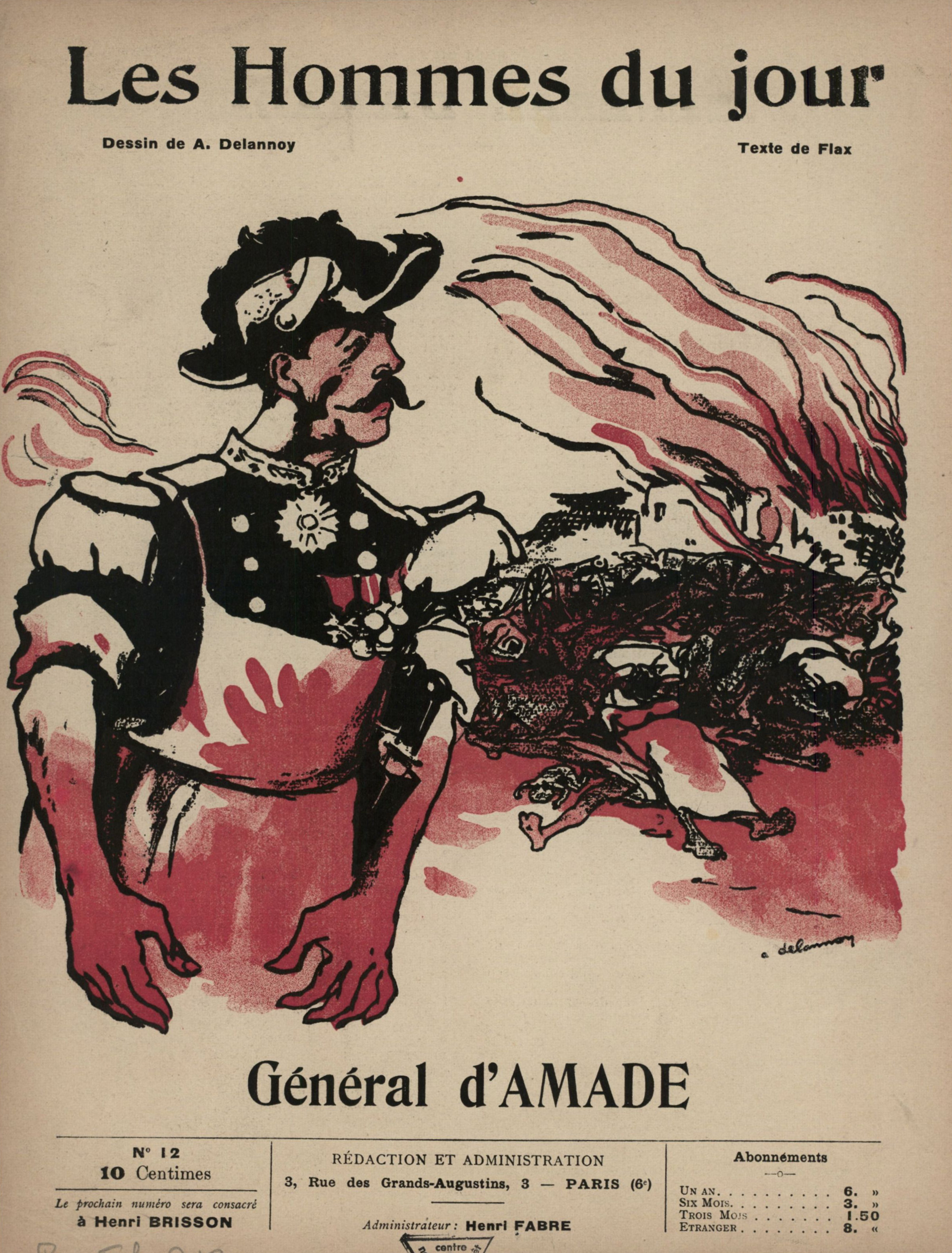
General d'Amade as "butcher of Morocco", 1908.

On 26 September 1908, he and Victor Méric were condemned to a year of prison and a 3000-franc fine, a considerable sum at the time, for having drawn General Albert d'Amade, who had become "decorated" in Morocco, as a butcher with a bloodstained apron. Fifteen people, among them Octave Mirbeau, Anatole France and Lucien Descaves, testified during the trial. The two men were incarcerated at La Santé Prison. His colleagues supported him in a special issue of L'Assiette au Beurre on 8 May entitled "Artists are people who...". Suffering from tuberculosis, Delannoy was released early, on 21 June 1909. The arrest caused a great chill in the cartooning world, with some no longer signing their work with their real names. In fact, a law even more restrictive on the freedom of the press was in the works.

In February 1910, he was a co-signer of the manifesto of the "Revolutionary anti-parliamentary committee" initiated by Jules Grandjouan.

=== Death ===
His tuberculosis worsened, and he was admitted to the sanatorium in Saint-Raphaël at the beginning of 1911. He returned to Paris in April and died the following month, leaving a widow and a young daughter.

== Bibliography ==
- L'art social à la Belle Époque : Aristide Delannoy, Jules Grandjouan, Maximilien Luce : trois artistes engagés, exhibition brochure, 19 November 2005 – 16 January 2006, Adiamos 89, Musée-Abbaye Saint Germain d'Auxerre, 2005, ISBN 2-909418-26-X.
- Frédéric Lavignette, L'affaire Liabeuf : histoires d'une vengeance, éditions Fage, 2011.
- Aristide Delannoy, un crayon de combat. Preface by Henry Poulaille. Editions Le Vent du Ch'min 1982. Contains all the cartoons drawn by Delannoy between 1900 and 1911. ISBN 2-902920-11-3.
