= Insert (print advertising) =

Separate advertisement included in a magazine or newspaper

In advertising, an insert, circular or blow-in card is a separate advertisement put in a magazine, newspaper, or other publication. They are usually the main source of income for non-subscription local newspapers and other publications. Sundays typically bring numerous large inserts in newspapers, because that is the day readers have time to browse advertising and plan their shopping around the weekly sales. Sunday also has the highest circulation of any day of the week.

== Similar terms ==
A buckslip or buck slip is a slip of paper, often the size of a U.S. dollar bill (a buck), which includes additional information about a product.

Bind-in cards are cards that are bound into the bindings of the publication, and will therefore not drop out.

An onsert appears on The Age, partially covering the masthead

An onsert is a separate advertisement put in a magazine, newspaper, or other publication. Onserts are affixed to a page, and may be a sample of a product, a compact disk, magnet, a small booklet or even a targeted advertisement.

== See also ==
- Outsert
- Supplement (publishing)
