= Hermann Vogel (French illustrator) =

French painter and illustrator

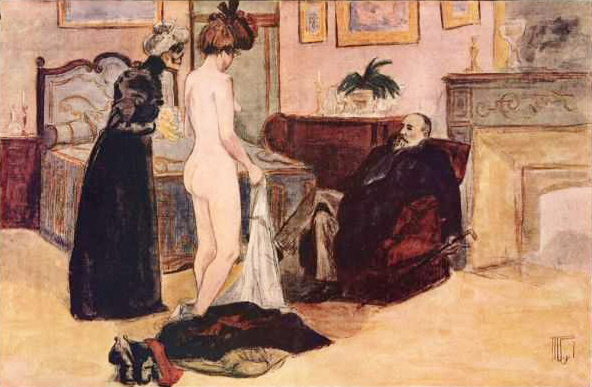
Gefällt Sie ihnen? by Vogel from the magazine L'Assiette de beurre

Hermann Vogel (1856–1918) was a French painter and illustrator of German origin.

Vogel was born in Flensburg, Duchy of Schleswig, then part of Denmark. He came to Hamburg in 1864 and studied at the Academy of Fine Arts Munich from 1872–78. Vogel then moved to Paris and became a French citizen.

Vogel illustrated numerous books and contributed drawings and paintings to magazines, especially L'assiette de beurre. Vogel died in Paris. His son was the art publisher and journalist Lucien Vogel (1886–1954).
