= Impasto =

Painting technique

Still Life: Vase with Pink Roses (1890) is an oil painting by Van Gogh which makes extensive use of the impasto technique.

Impasto is a technique used in painting where paint is laid on an area of the surface thickly, usually thick enough that the brush or painting-knife strokes are visible. Paint can also be mixed right on the canvas. When dry, impasto provides texture; the paint appears to be coming out of the canvas.

== Etymology ==
The word impasto is Italian in origin; in which it means "dough" or "mixture"; related to the verb impastare, "to knead", or "to paste". Italian usage of impasto includes both a painting and a potting technique. The root noun of impasto is pasta, meaning "paste".

== Media ==
Oil paint is the traditional medium for impasto painting, due to its thick consistency and slow drying time. Acrylic paint can also be used for impasto by adding heavy body acrylic gels. Impasto is generally not used in watercolor or tempera without the addition of thickening agent due to the inherent thinness of these media. An artist working in pastels can produce a limited impasto effect by pressing a soft pastel firmly against the paper.

== Purposes ==
The impasto technique serves several purposes. First, it makes the light reflect in a particular way, giving the artist additional control over the play of light in the painting. Second, it can add expressiveness to the painting, with the viewer being able to notice the strength and speed by which the artist applied the paint. Third, impasto can push a piece from a painting to a three-dimensional sculptural rendering. The first objective was originally sought by masters such as Rembrandt, Titian, and Vermeer, to represent folds in clothes or jewels: it was then juxtaposed with a more delicate painting style. A 2019 study of paint samples from three of Rembrandt's paintings, including the portrait of Marten Soolmans, found plumbonacrite, a lead compound that is extremely rare in historic paint layers, in his impasto; the researchers concluded that he probably added lead oxide (litharge) to the oil to make a paste-like paint. Much later, the French Impressionists created pieces covering entire canvases with rich impasto textures. Vincent van Gogh used it frequently for aesthetics and expression. Abstract expressionists such as Hans Hofmann and Willem de Kooning also made extensive use of it, motivated in part by a desire to create paintings which dramatically record the action of painting itself. Still more recently, Frank Auerbach has used such heavy impasto that some of his paintings become nearly three-dimensional.

Impasto gives texture to a painting, meaning that it may be contrasted with more flat, smooth, or blended painting styles.

== Artists ==
Many artists have used the impasto technique. Some of the more notable ones include Rembrandt van Rijn, Diego Velázquez, Vincent van Gogh, Jackson Pollock, and Willem de Kooning.

Selected examples of paintings which make use of the impasto technique

Crags and Crevices by Jane Frank (1960). As with many abstract expressionist works (and many so-called "action paintings" as well), impasto is a prominent feature.

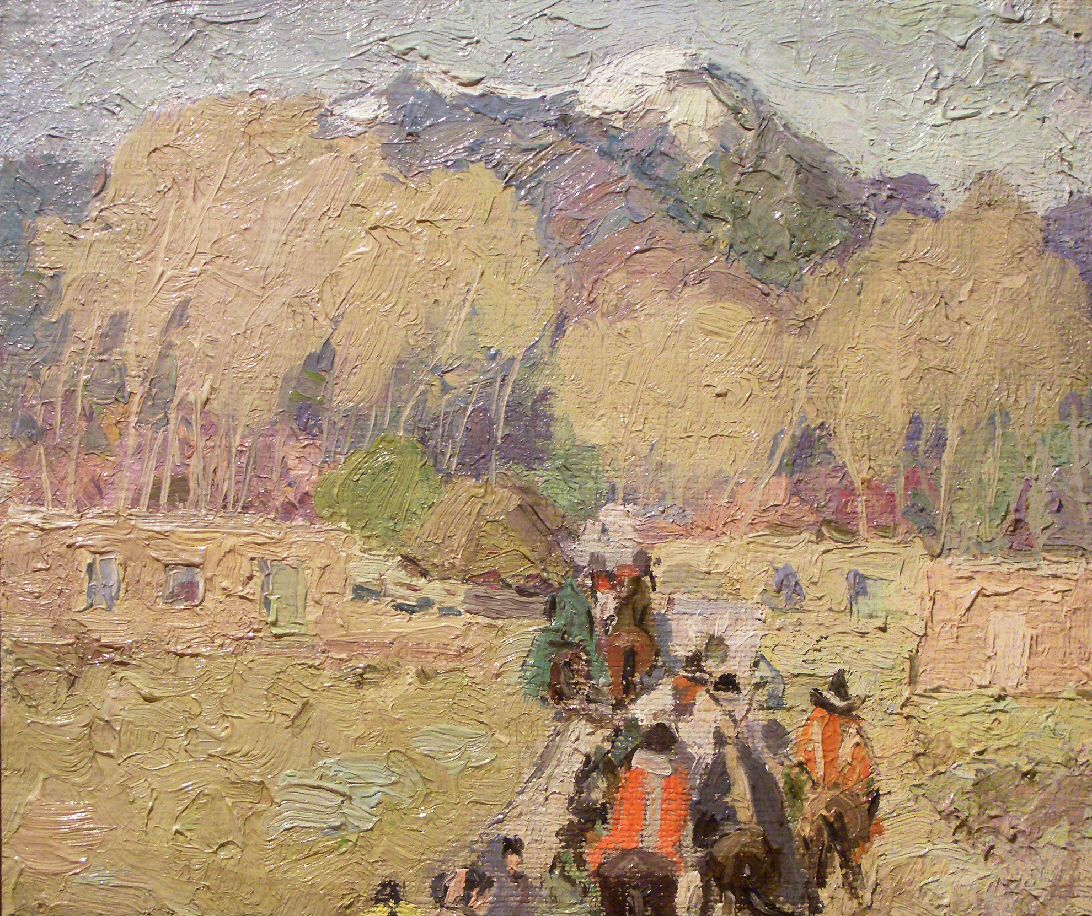
Taos Mountain, Trail Home by Cordelia Wilson (1920). A landscape entirely executed with a bold impasto technique.

Starry Night by van Gogh (1889). The impasto technique and line structure gives his viewers the feeling that the sky is moving.

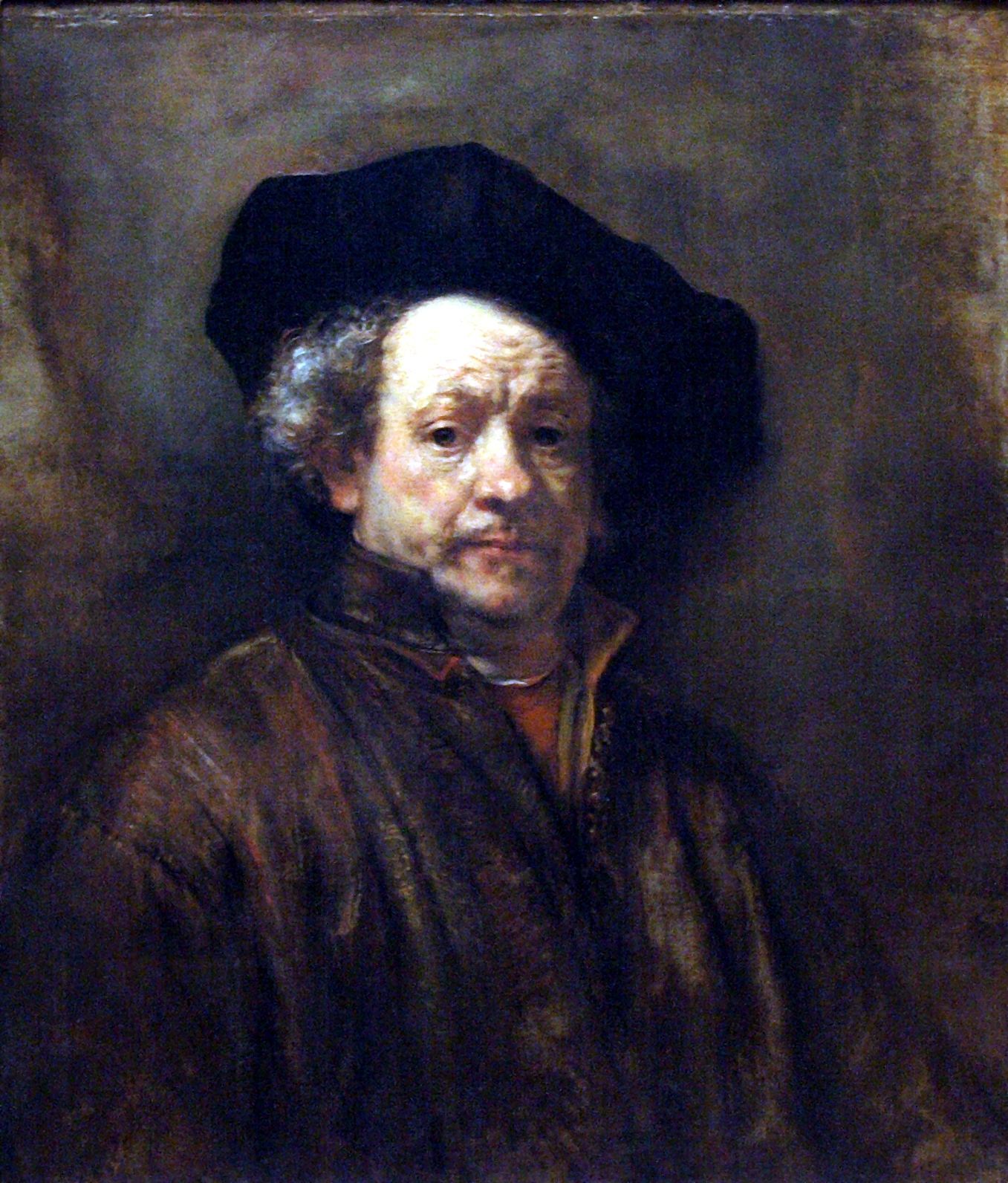
Self Portrait by Rembrandt (1660). His use of impasto was surely inspired by Titian, and the addition of impasto showed a new method of illusion in the artist's work.

== See also ==
- List of art techniques
