= Amélie Diéterle =

French actress and singer

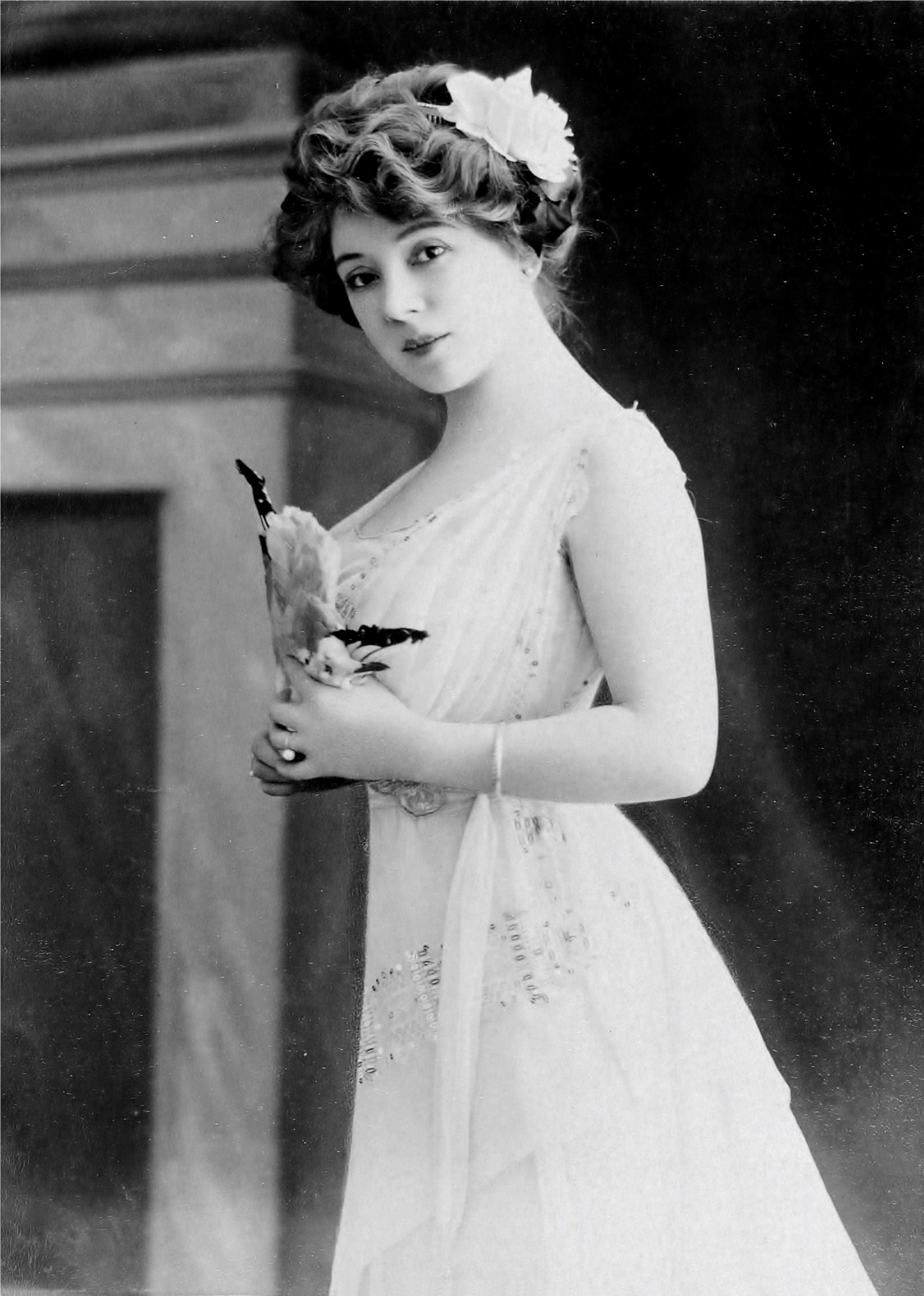
- Amélie Diéterle, photographed by Nadar c. 1895.
- Born: 20 February 1871; Strasbourg, Alsace–Lorraine, German Empire (now Strasbourg, Grand Est, France)
- Died: 20 January 1941 (aged 69); Cannes, Vichy France
- Occupation: Actor
- Years active: 1892–1922
- Spouse: André Louis Simon (m. 1930)

Signature
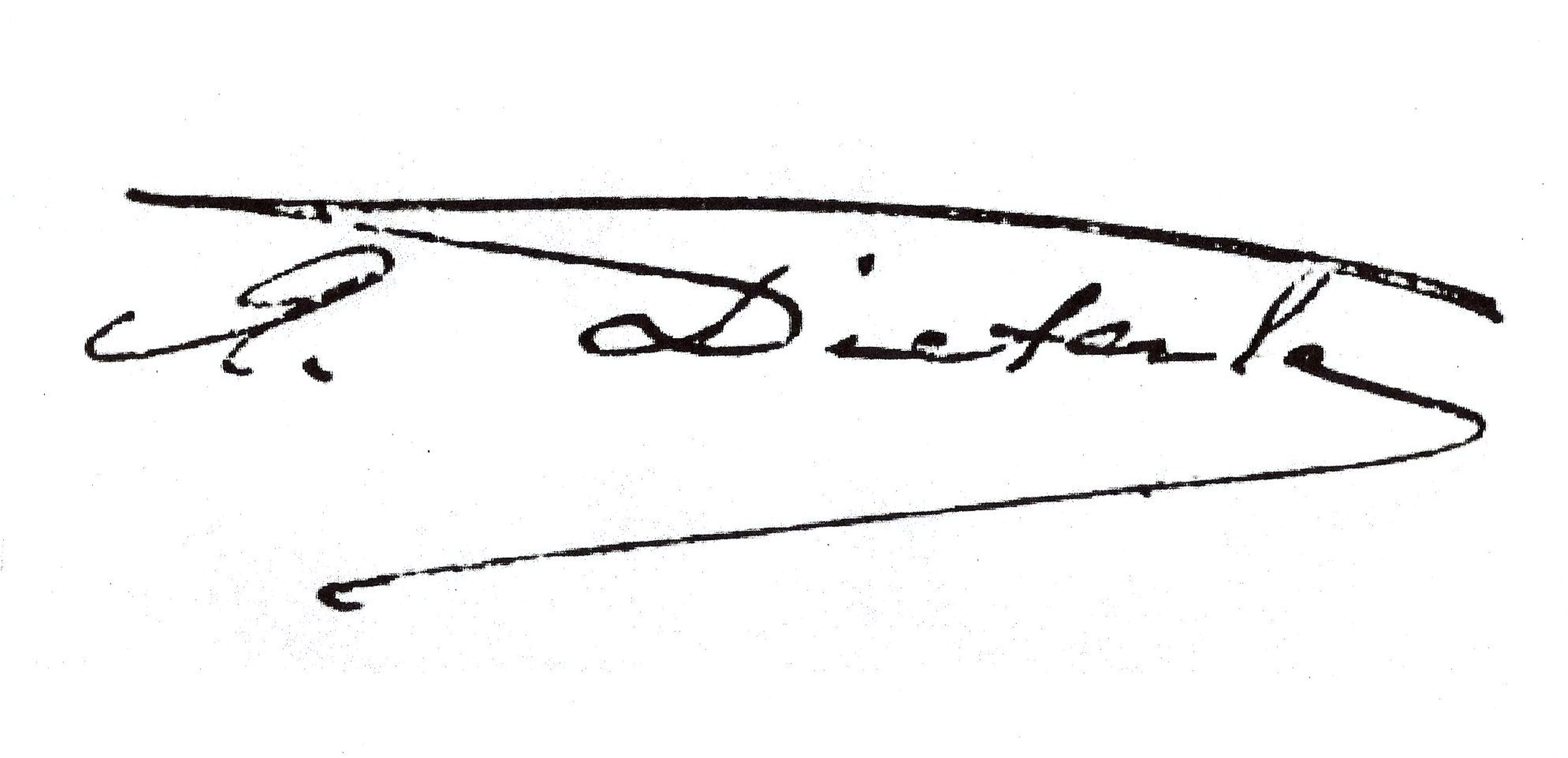

Amélie Diéterle (20 February 1871 – 20 January 1941) was a French actress and opera singer. She was one of the popular actresses of the Belle Époque until the beginning of the Années Folles. Amélie Diéterle inspired the poets Léon Dierx and Stéphane Mallarmé and the painters Auguste Renoir, Henri de Toulouse-Lautrec, and Alfred Philippe Roll.

== Biography ==
Amélie Diéterle was born in Strasbourg on 20 February 1871. She was the daughter of a maidservant from Munich and a young French officer, Captain Louis Laurent who was garrisoned nearby in 1870.

Having won first prize of song and solfège at the Conservatory of Dijon, she went to Paris in 1889 where she was chosen from 40 competitors to enter the Concerts Colonne. She was a pupil of Alice Ducasse who had been a singer of the Opéra-Comique. She was spotted in 1891 by the conductor of the Théâtre des Variétés and presented to the director Eugène Bertrand who hired her. This began a career of nearly 35 years in the troupe of the Variety Theatre. She became a permanent actress who had her own rooms and reserved box.

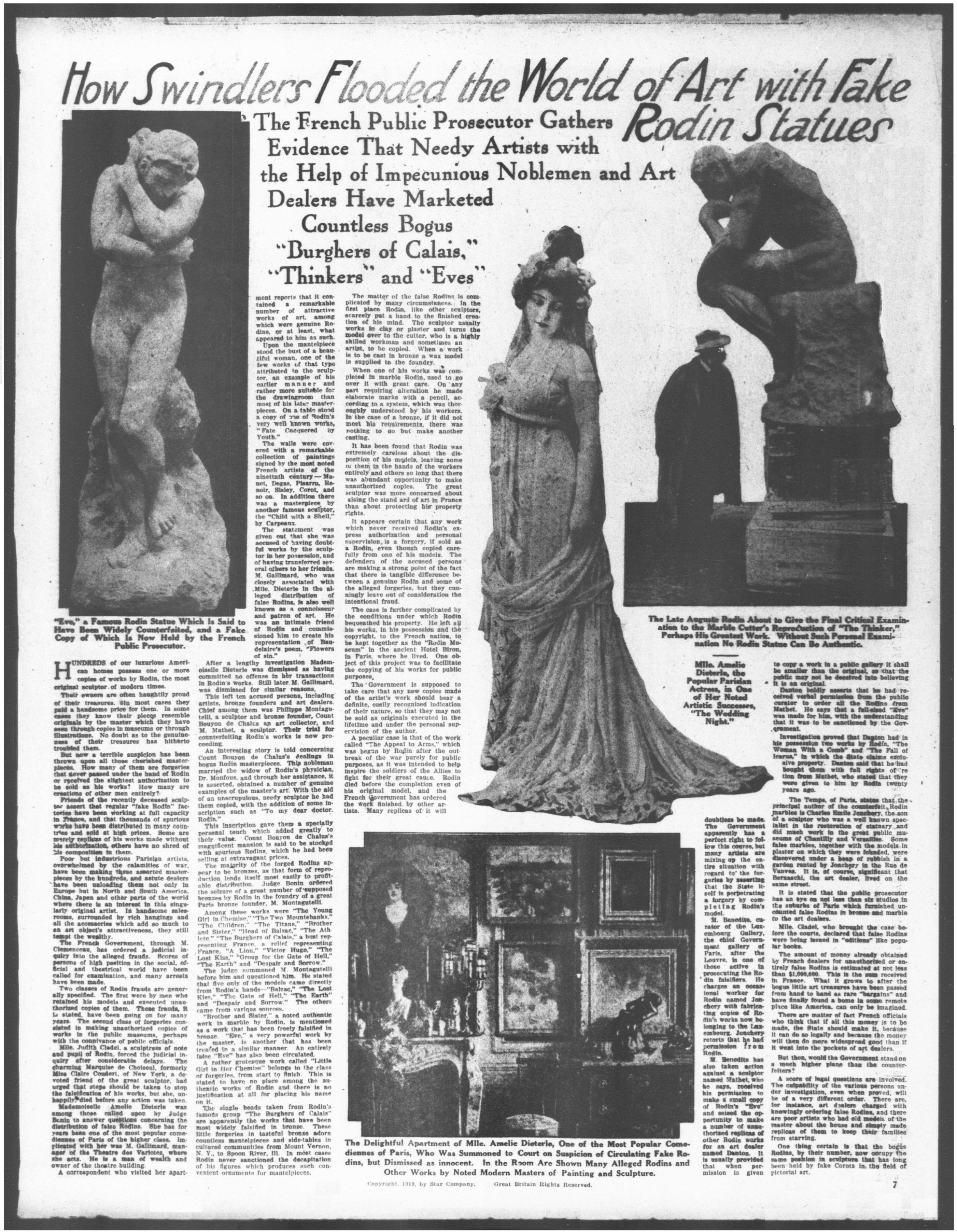
Newspaper Washington Times of Sunday, 6 July 1919. The affair of the fake Rodin statues in the United States.

She became the protégé of art collector Paul Gallimard, who was also the owner of the Variety Theater. She also inspired poets Léon Dierx and Stéphane Mallarmé.

Auguste Renoir made three portraits of her, a lithograph in gray on wove paper in 1899, exhibited at the Art Institute of Chicago Museum and a pastel in 1903, exhibited at the Museum of Fine Arts of Boston.

The two paintings depict Amélie Diéterle wearing a white hat. The third portrait, made around 1910, is a pastel, currently at the Antoine-Lecuyer Museum in Saint-Quentin.

One of the three works was loaned in 1922 by Gaston Bernheim (1870–1953) to the exhibition A Hundred Years of French Painting (1821–1921) from Ingres to Cubism, organized for the benefit of the Strasbourg Museum (hometown of the actress) at the Parisian headquarters of the Antiquarian Room (reproduced in the article by Léandre Vaillat in L'Illustration n° 4136 of 1er April 1922).

Alfred Philippe Roll made a painting of her in June 1913, showing her half-naked sitting in a garden chair with . This painting is donated by Mrs. Henriette Roll at the Museum of Fine Arts of the City of Paris, at the Petit Palais.

She lived for a long time in the city of Croissy-sur-Seine.

On 16 June 1930, she married a friend of the family, André Louis Simon (1877–1965), in Vallauris.

Amélie Diéterle took refuge in Vallauris after June 1940 and died in Cannes after a long illness on 20 January 1941, at the age of 69 years.

== Distinctions ==
Amélie Diéterle Appointed Officer of public instruction

== Gallery ==
A career in photography.

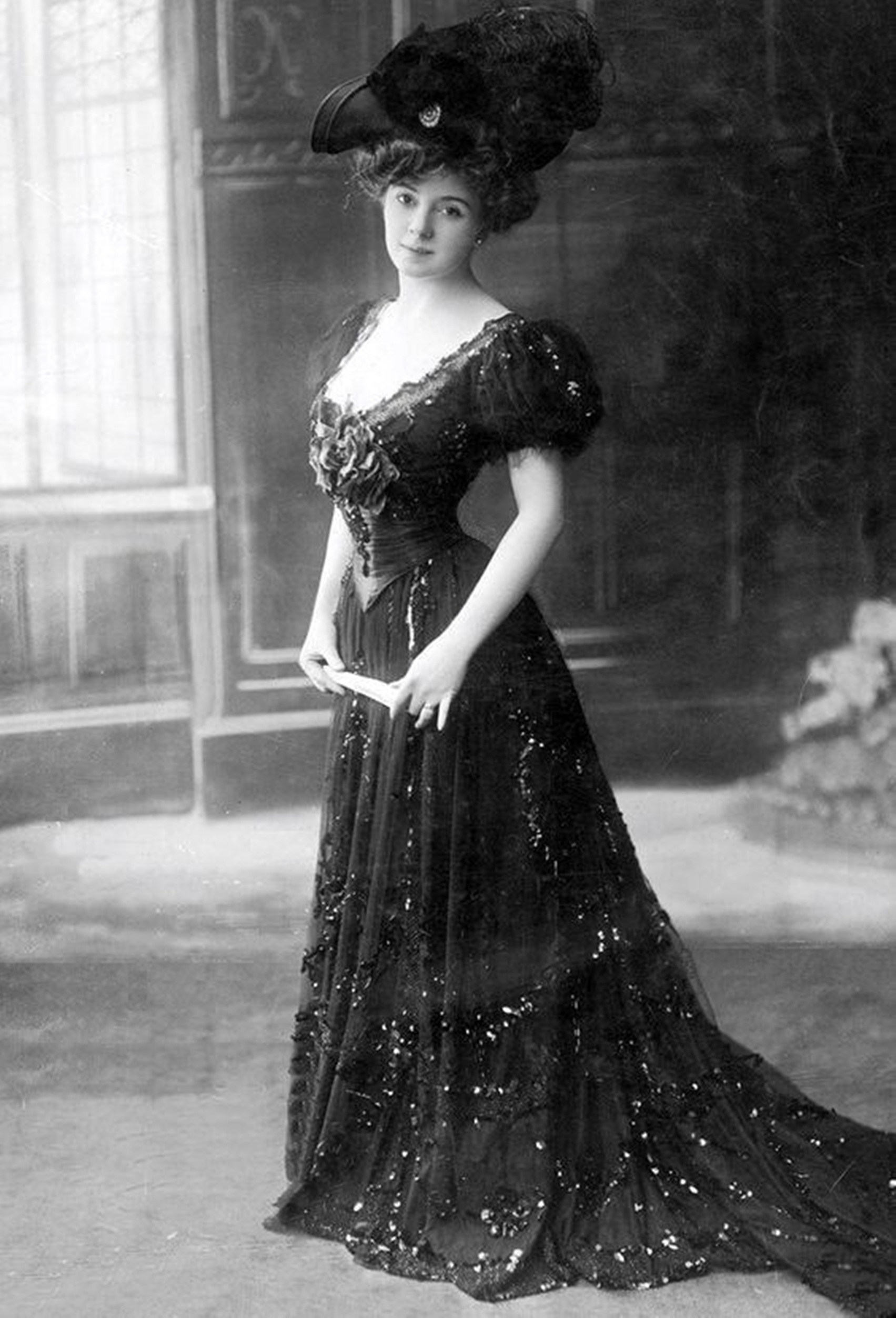
Amélie Diéterle by Nadar, around 1895.

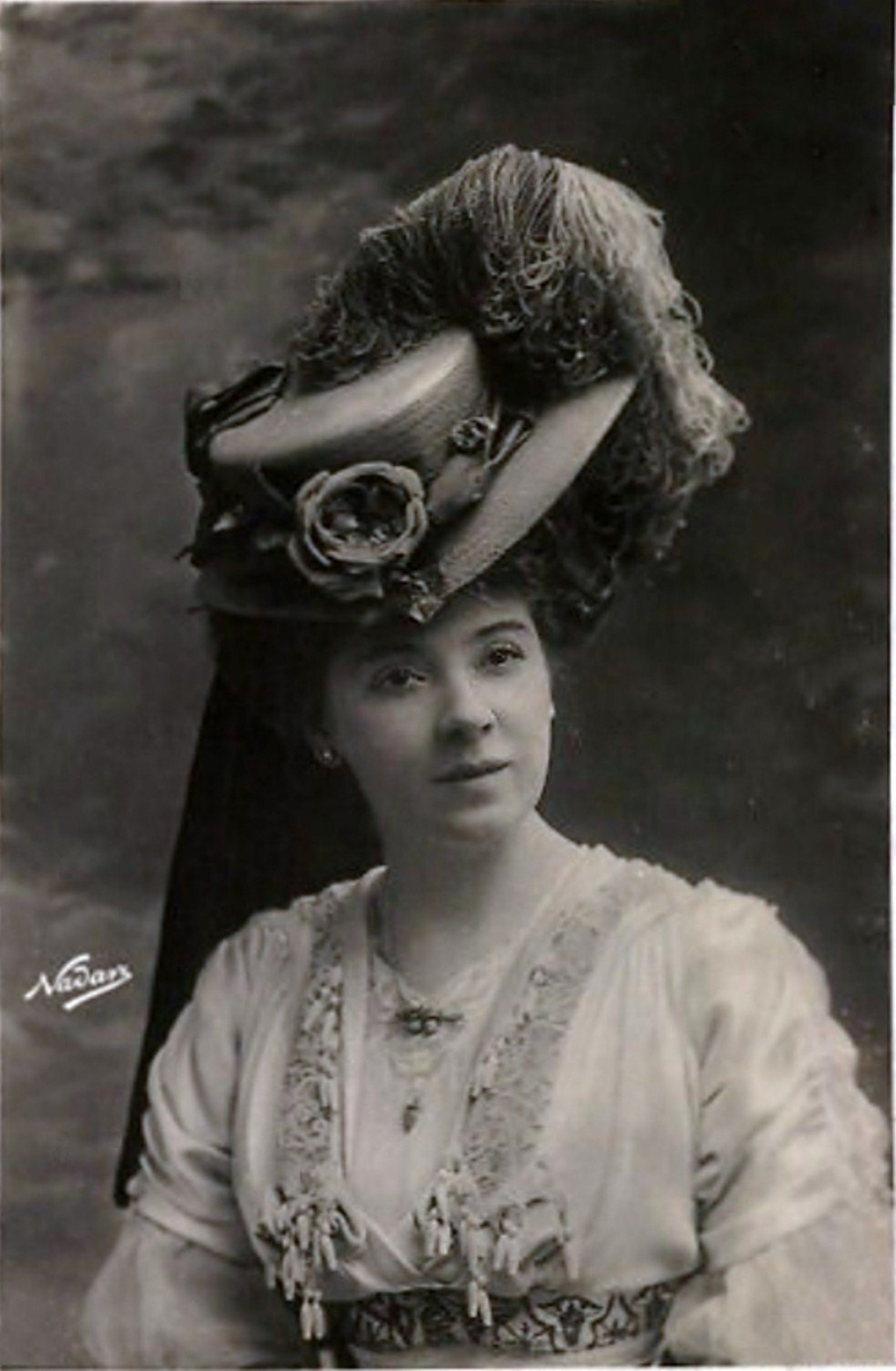
Amélie Diéterle by Nadar.

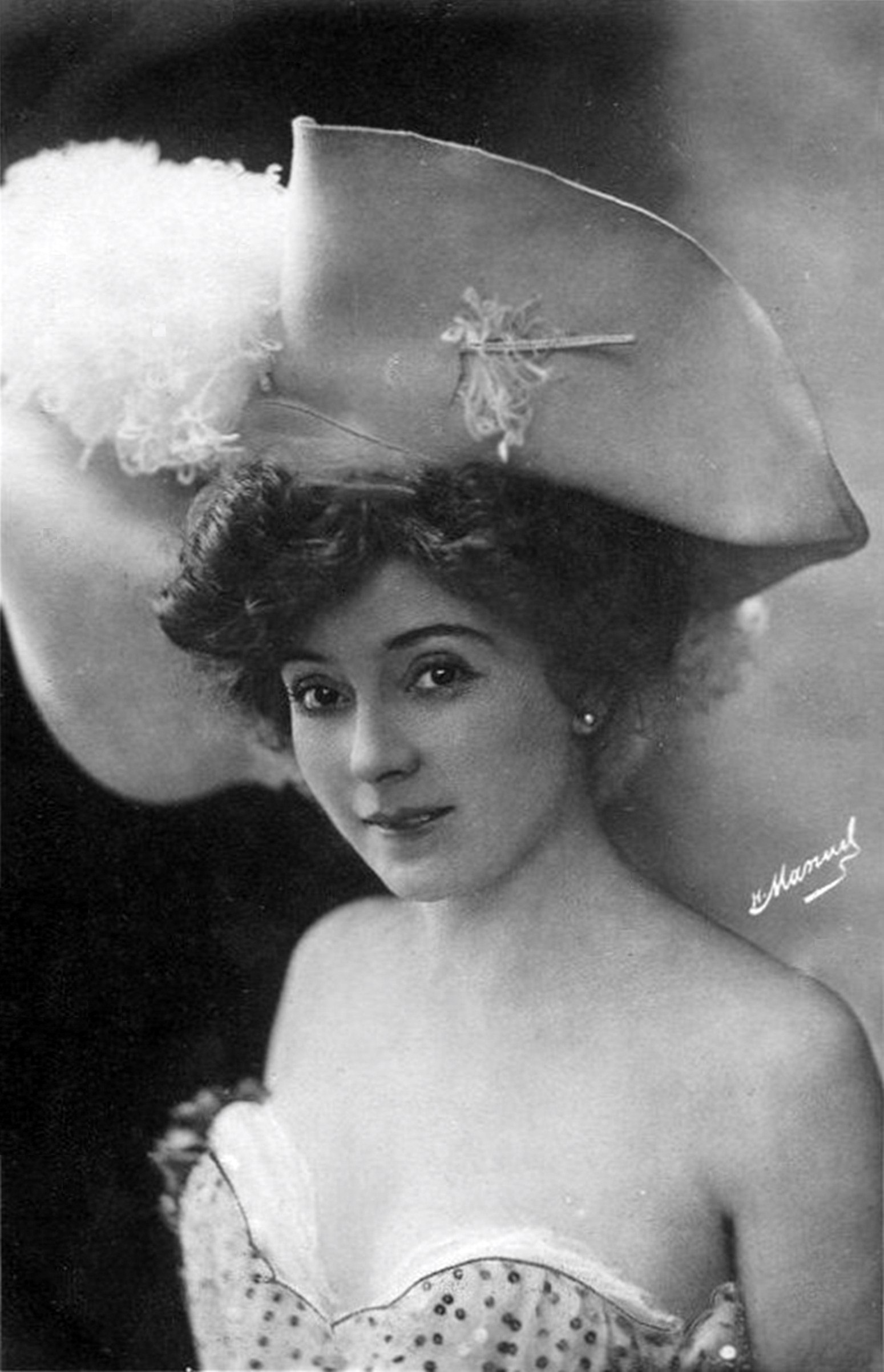
Photograph of Amélie Diéterle, circa 1900 by Henri Manuel.

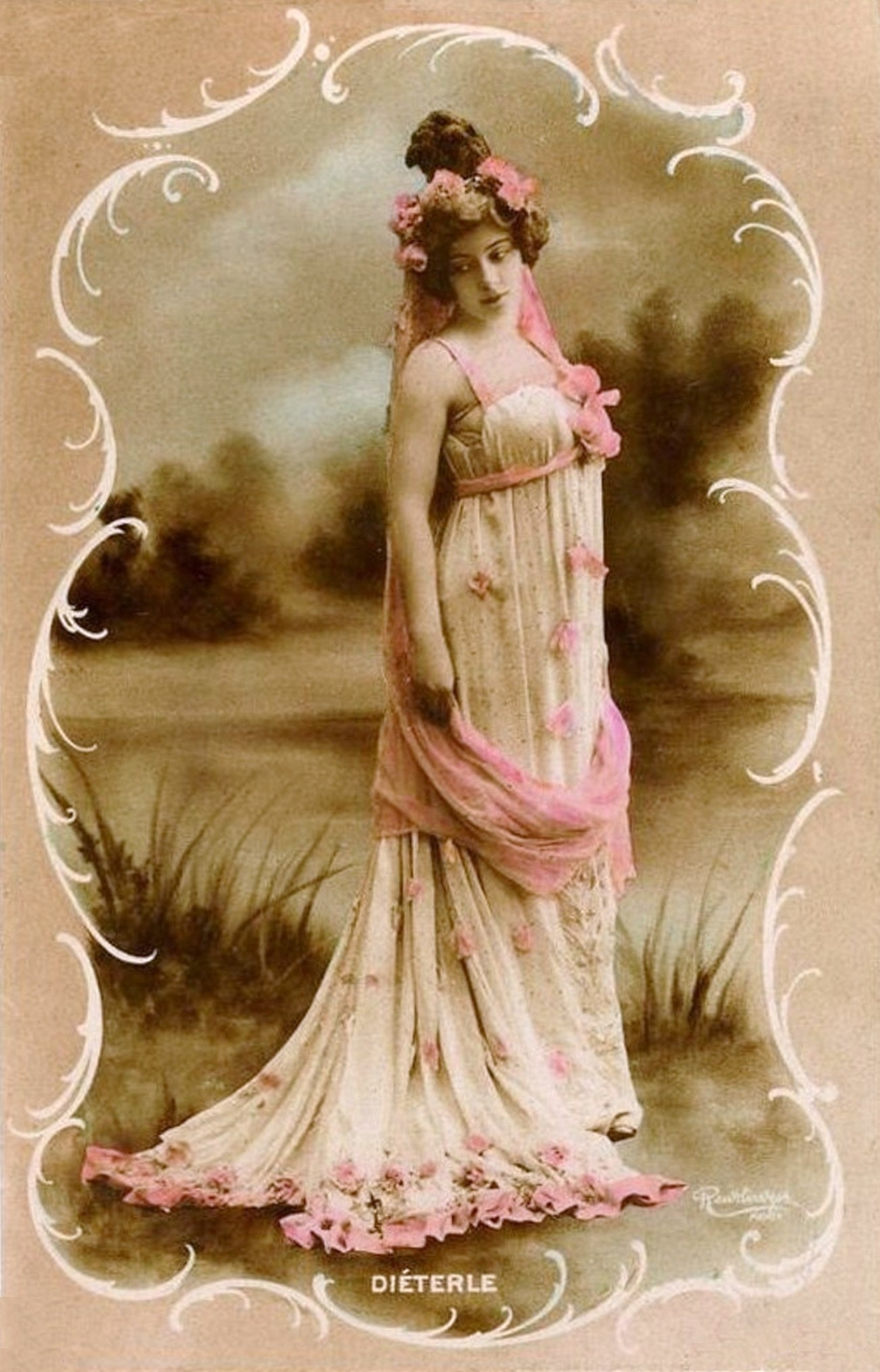
Amélie Diéterle by photographer Léopold-Émile Reutlinger.

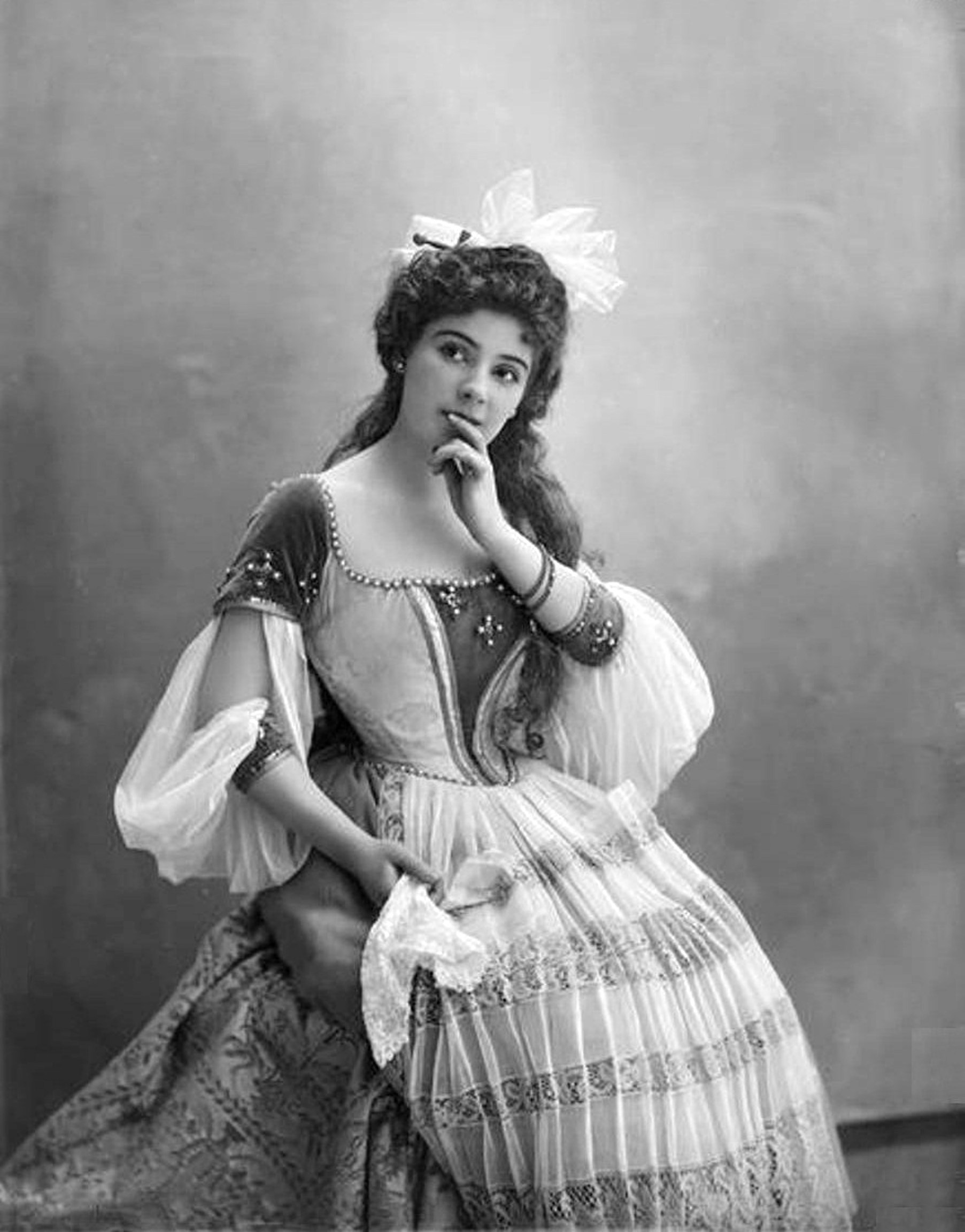
Amélie Diéterle by Nadar in 1895 in the operetta: Le carnet du diable.

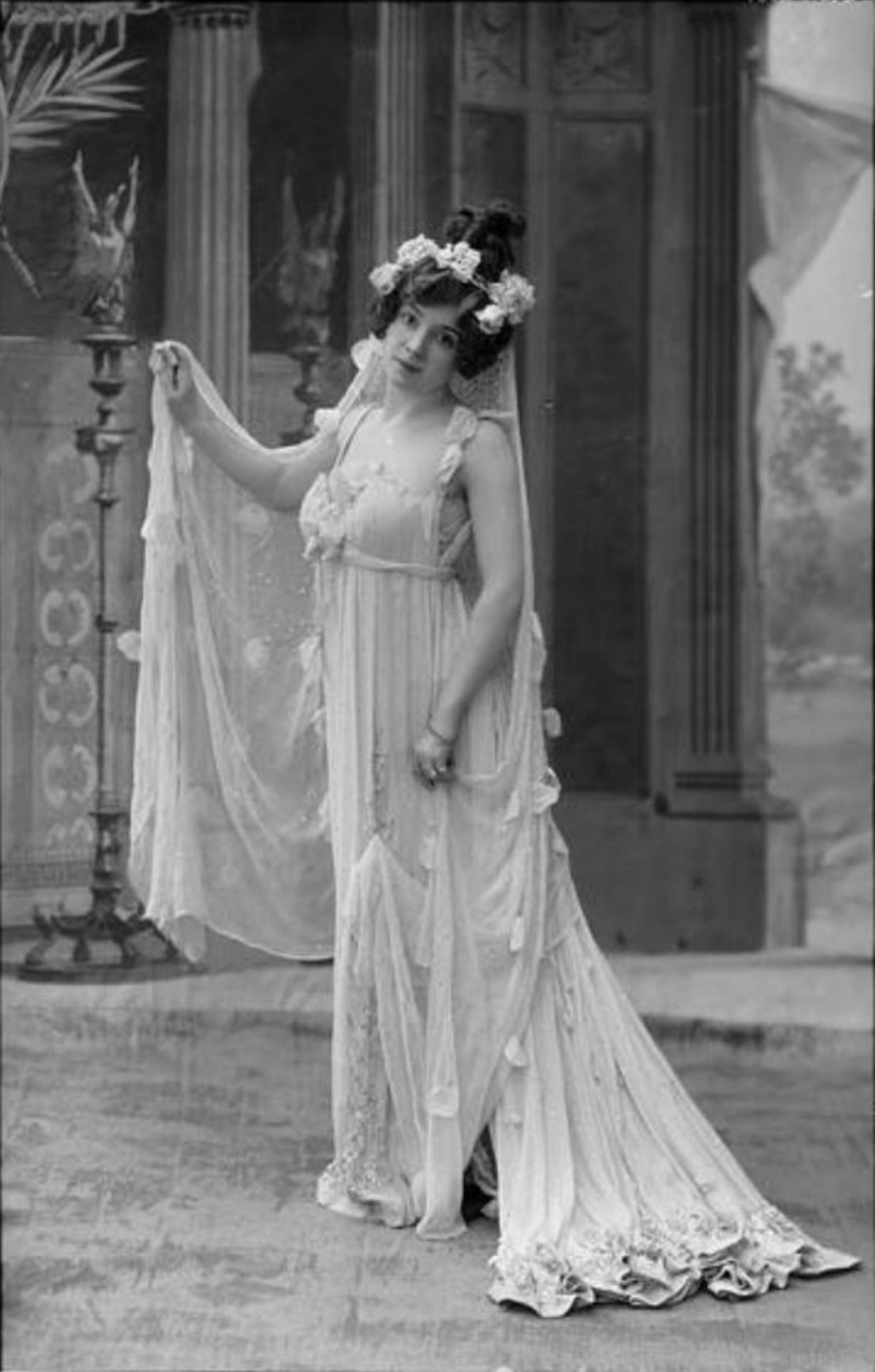
Amélie Diéterle by Nadar in 1901 in the opera bouffe : The Labors of Hercules.

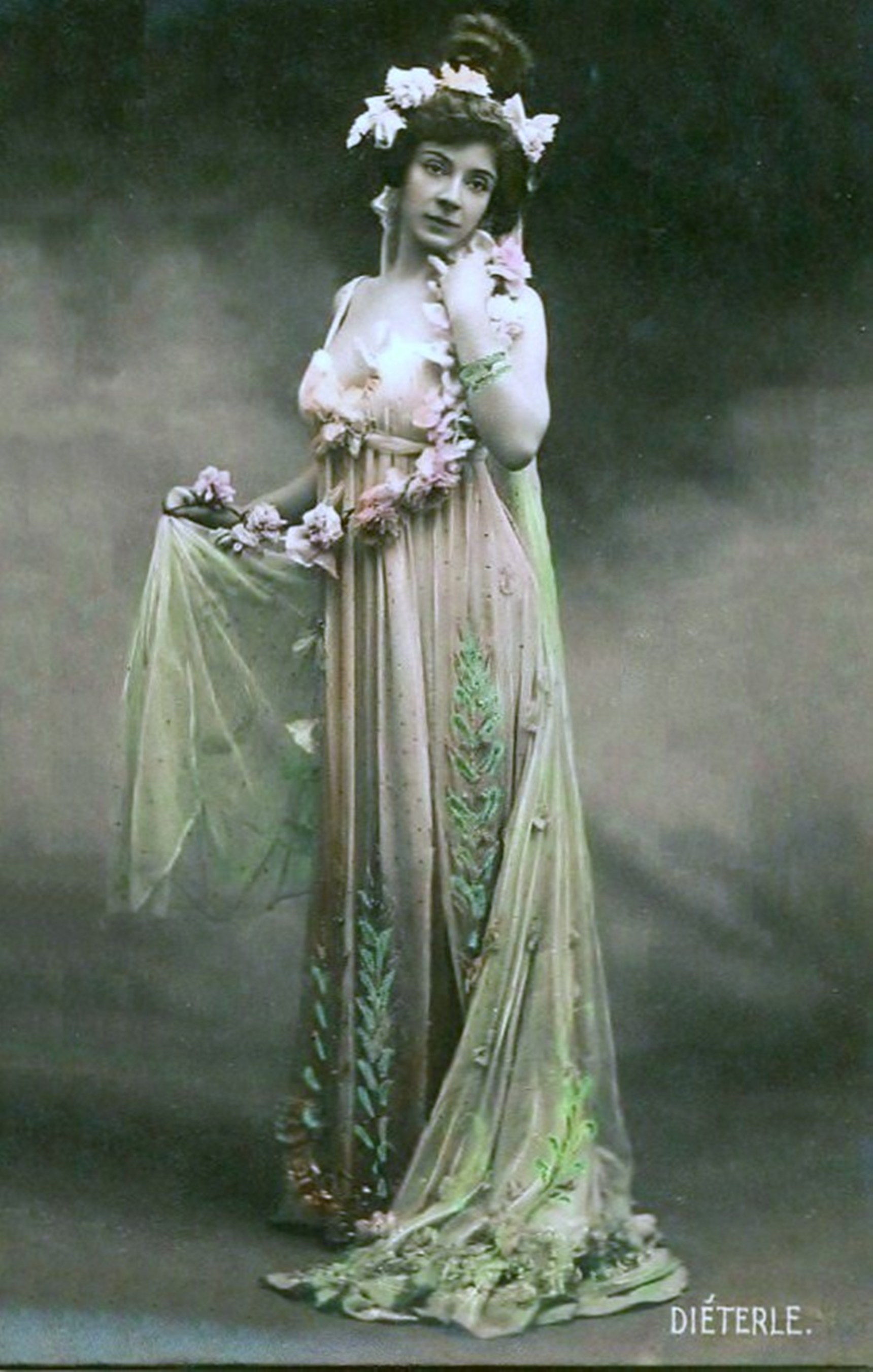
The character of Queen Omphale by Nadar, in colorized version.

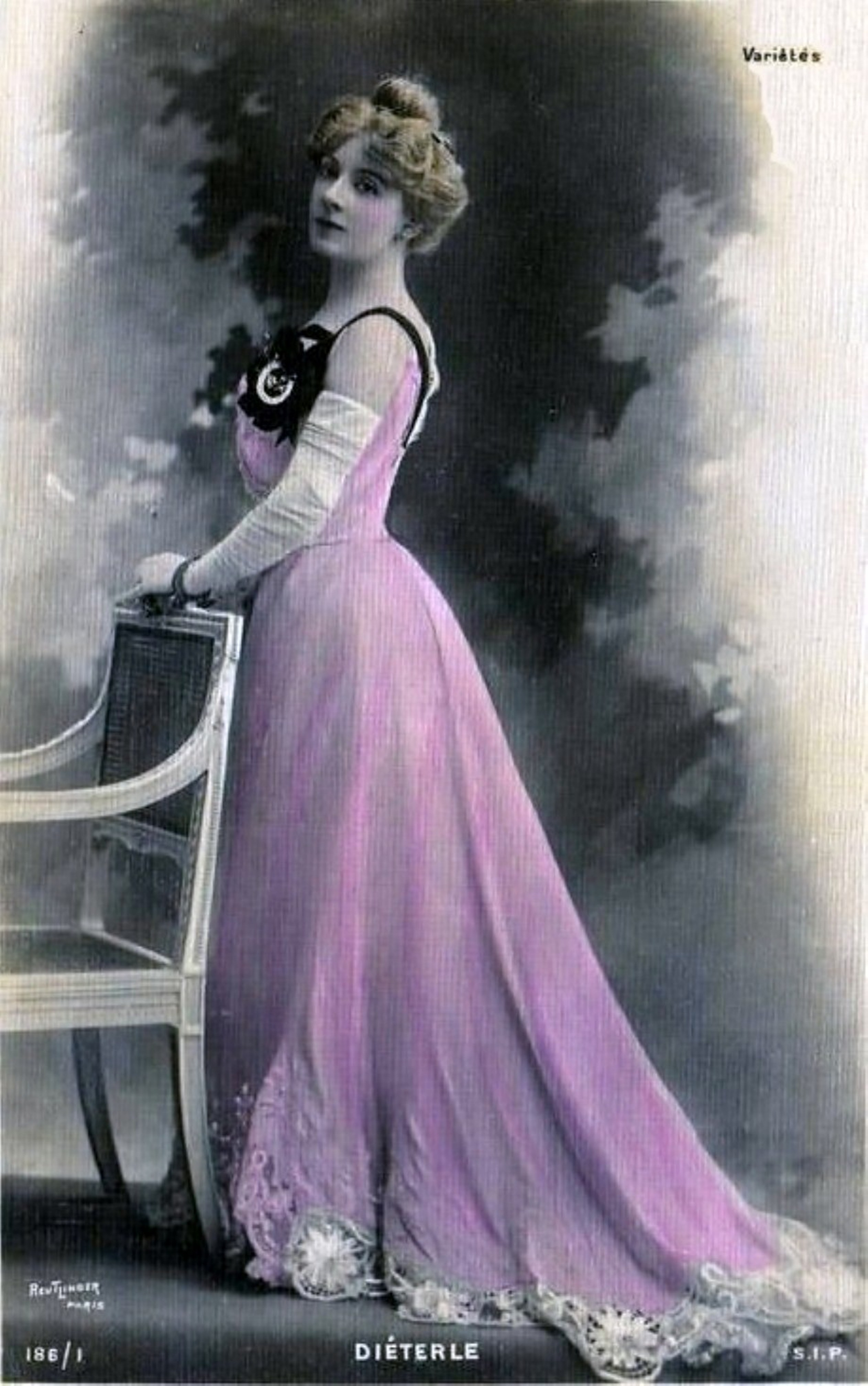
Amélie Diéterle by Léopold-Émile Reutlinger, in 1909.

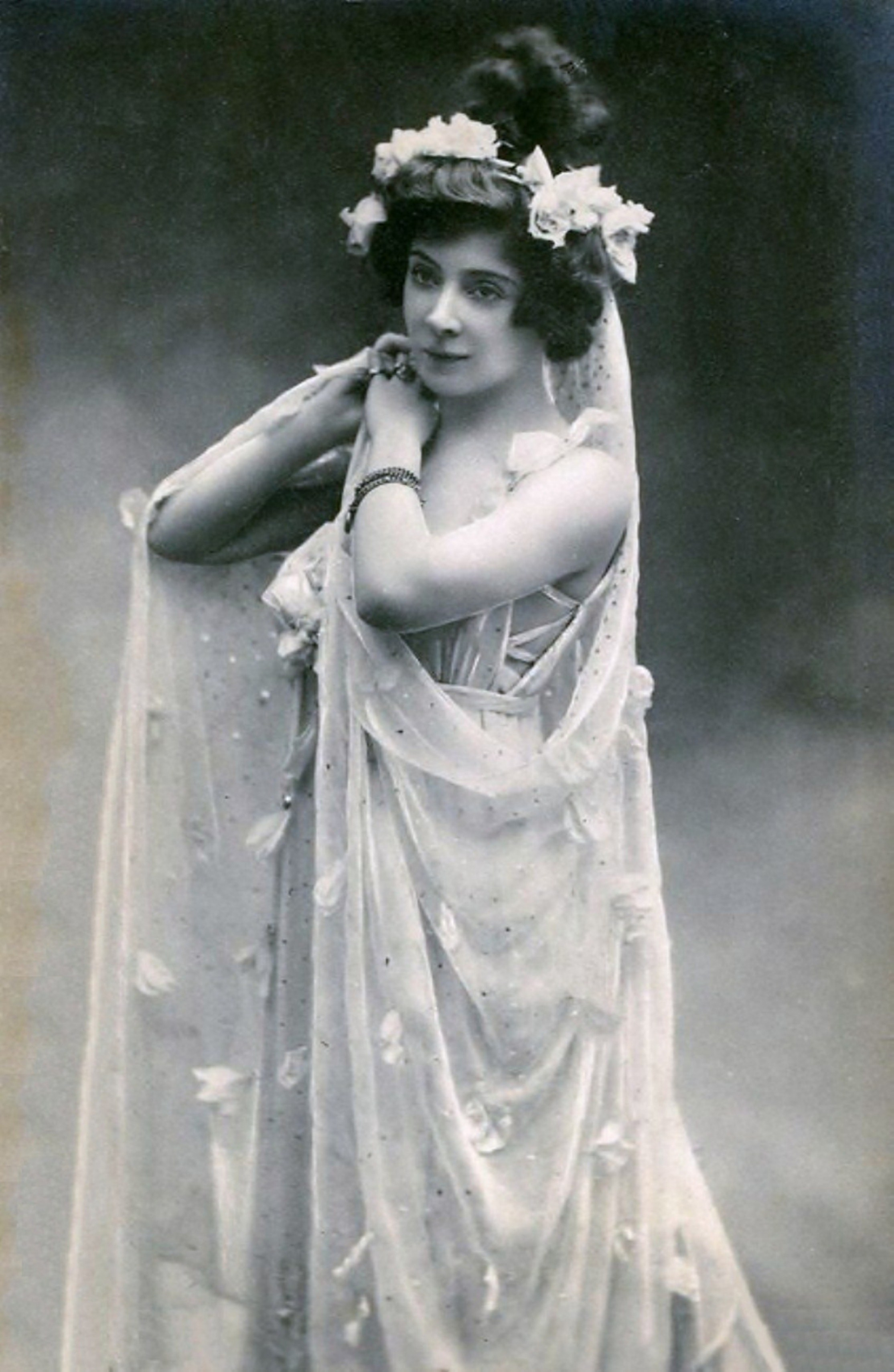
Amélie Diéterle by Nadar, in 1901.

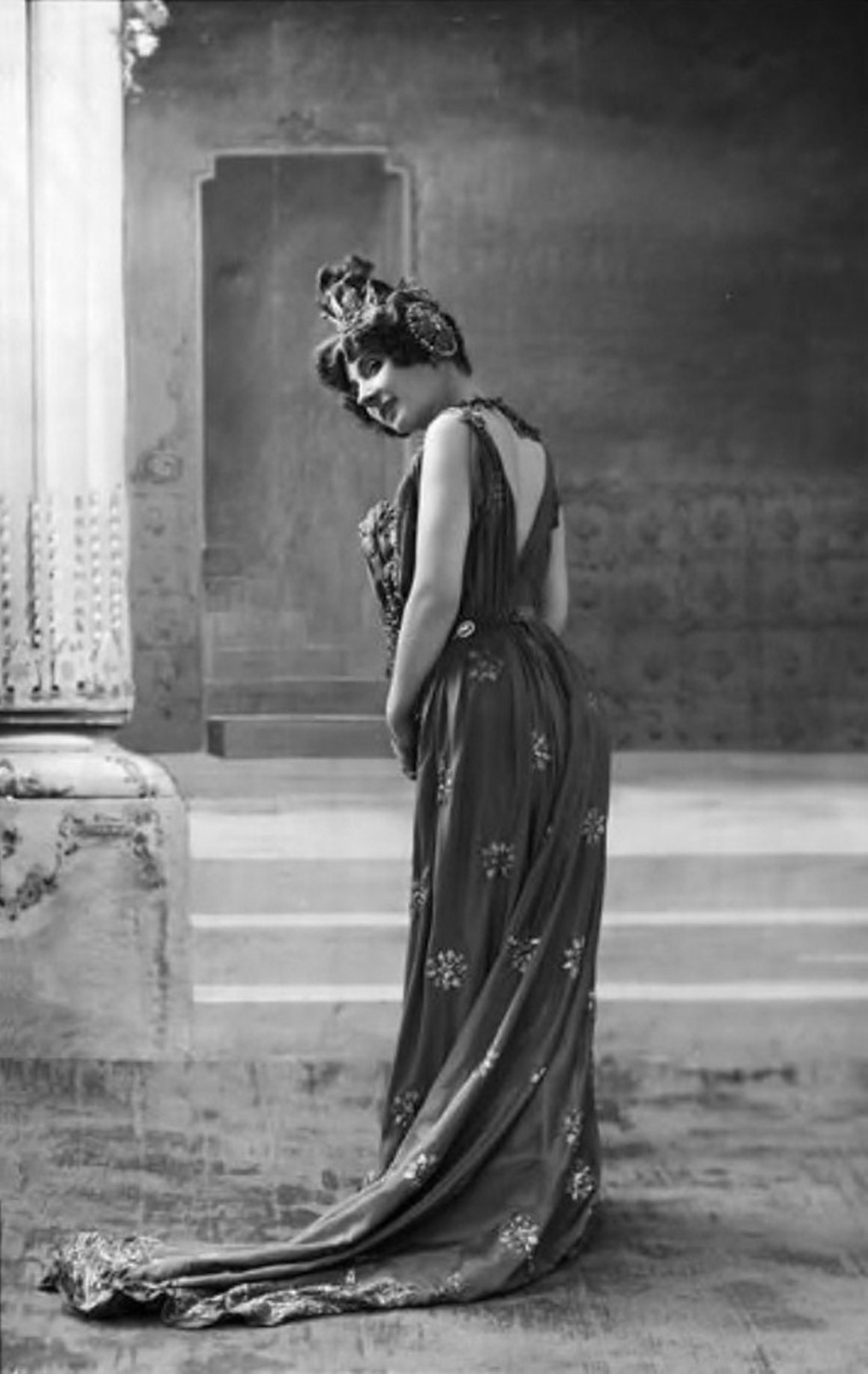
Amélie Diéterle at the Theater of the Bouffes-Parisiens.

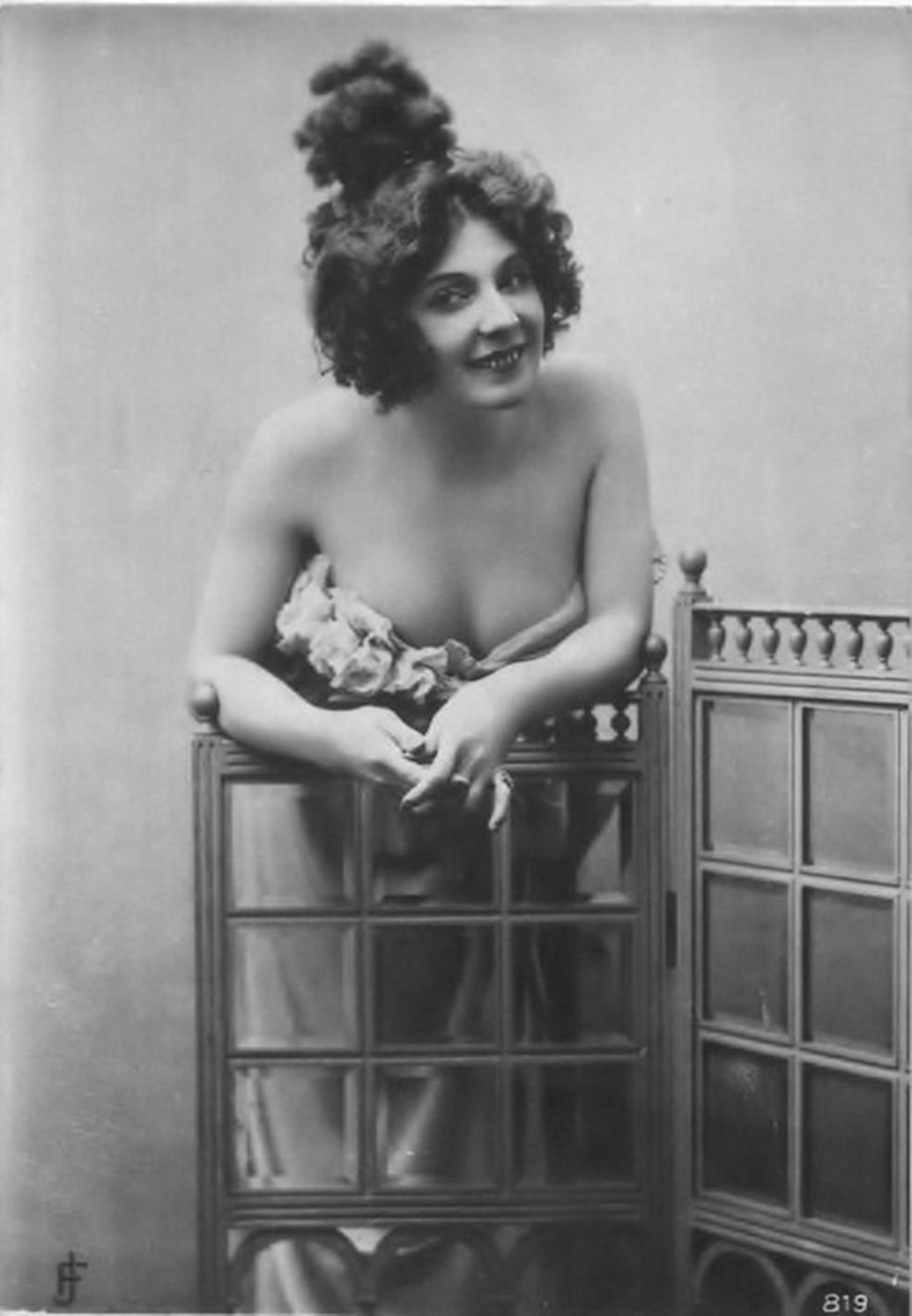
Amélie Diéterle, the charm of French theater.

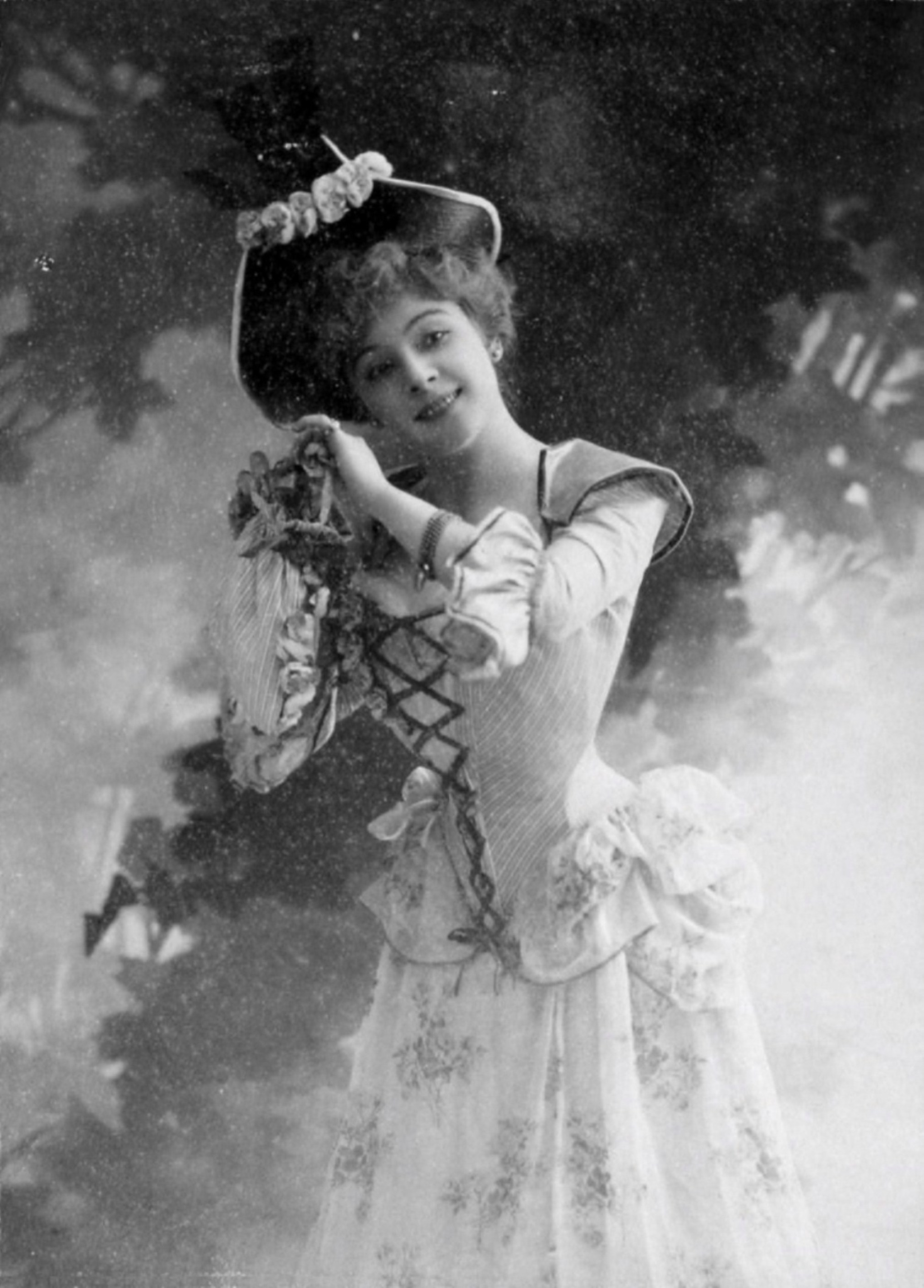
Amélie Diéterle by Léopold-Émile Reutlinger, around 1895.

== Theater ==
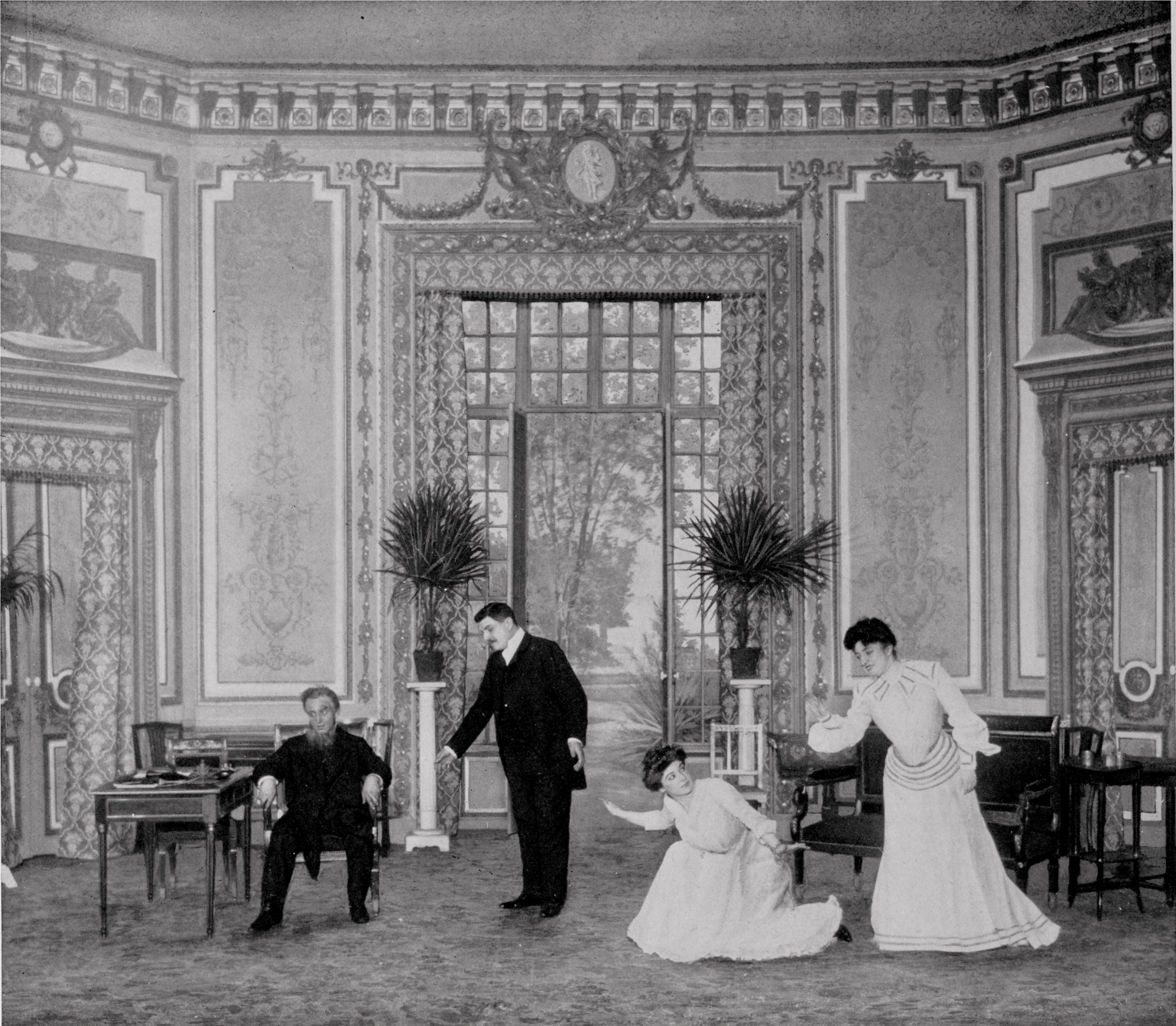
The actress kneeling on the stage in the play Madame la Présidente (1902). Role : Réséda.

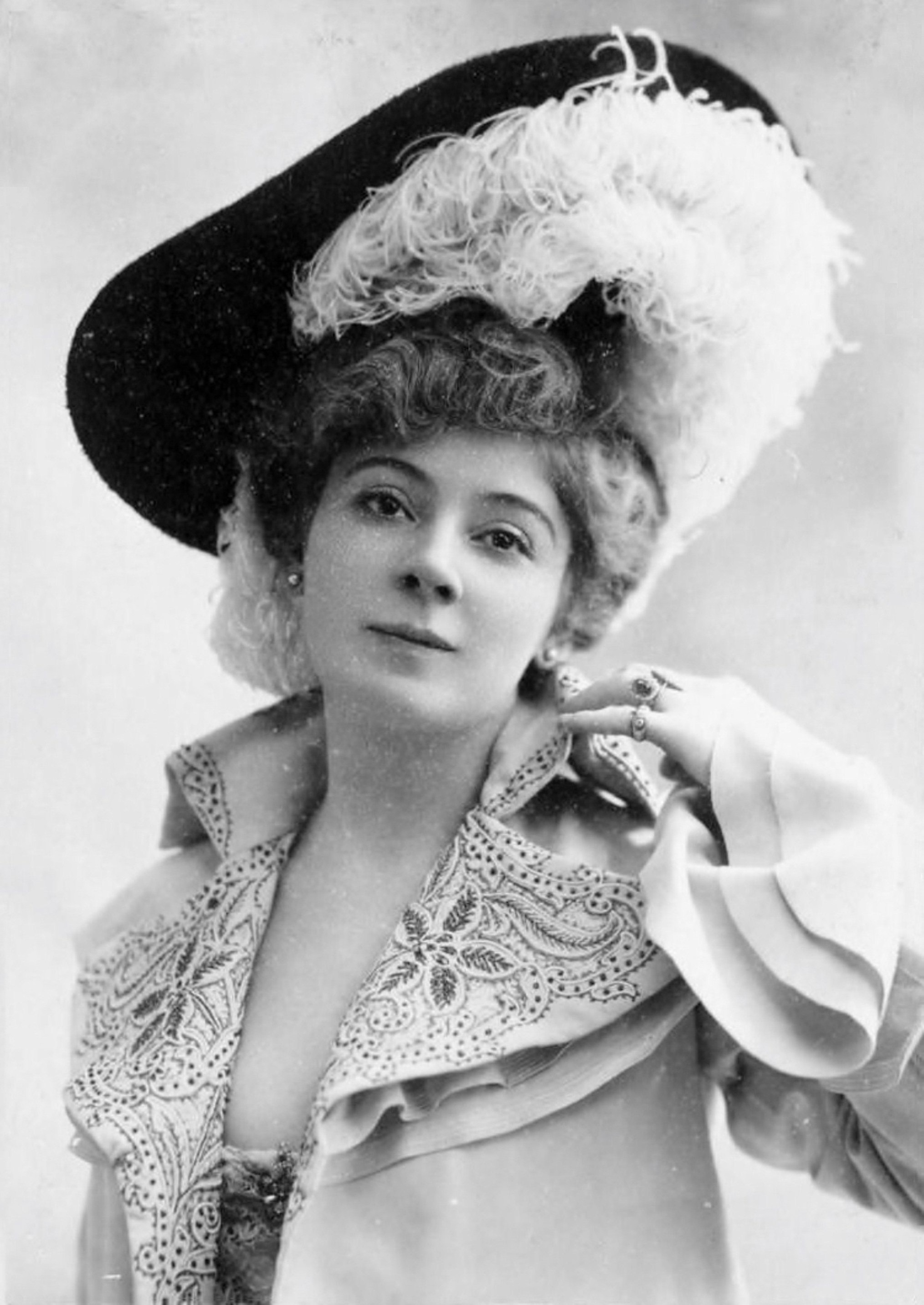
Amélie Diéterle by Léopold-Émile Reutlinger c. 1895.

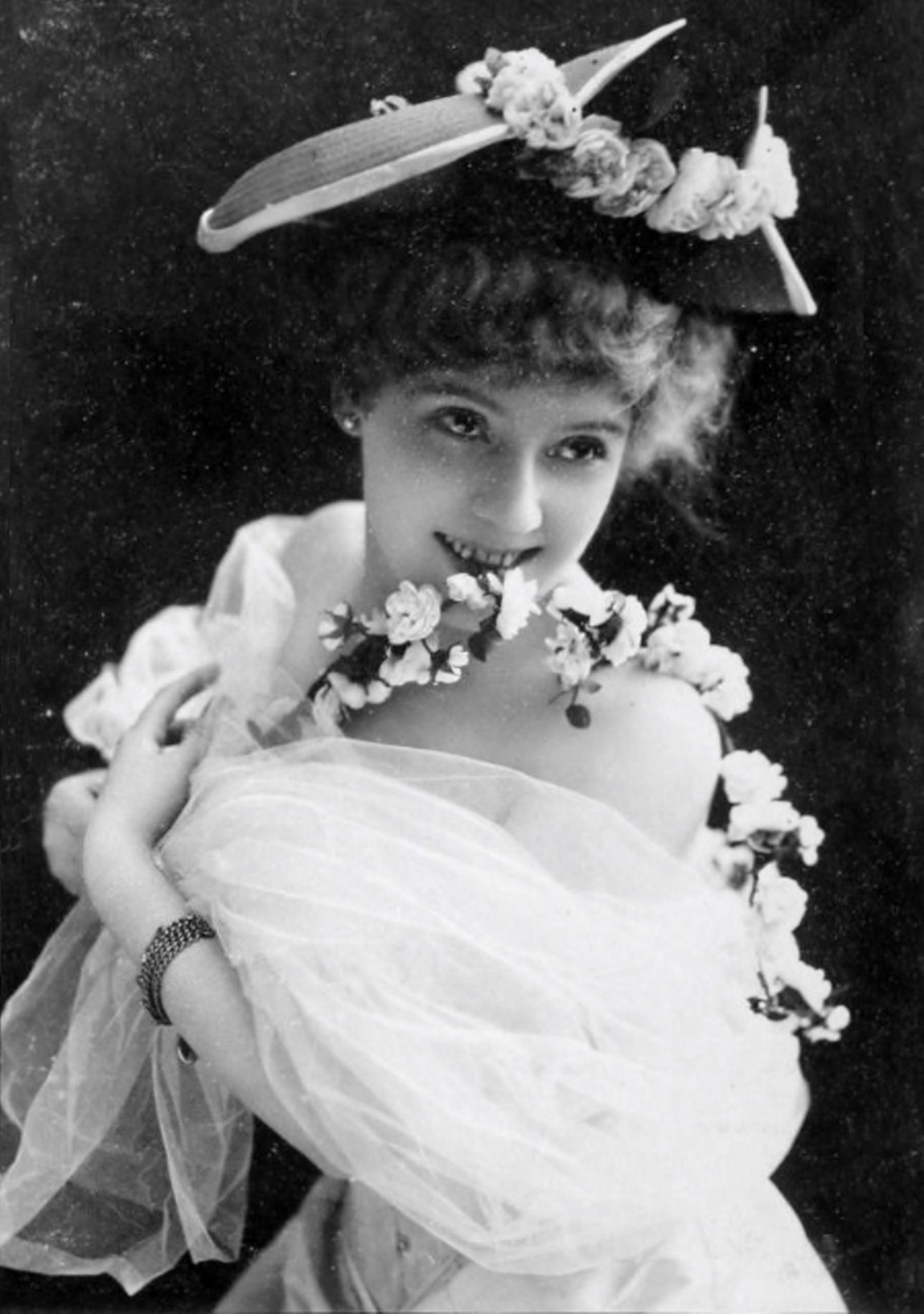
Amélie Diéterle, a muse of the Belle Époque.

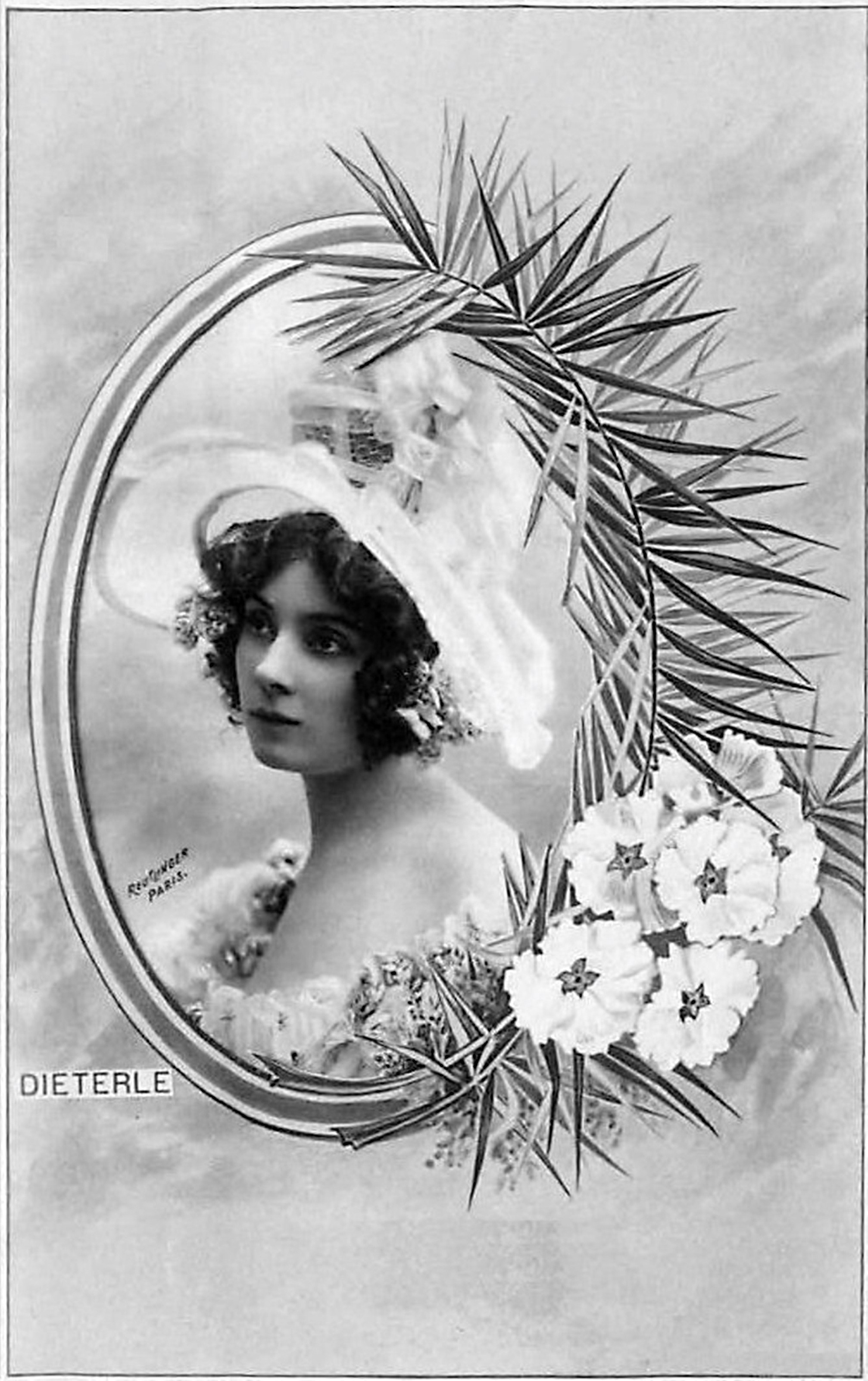
Amélie Diéterle by Léopold-Émile Reutlinger c. 1898.

- 1892: La Vie parisienne, opera in four acts by Henri Meilhac and Ludovic Halévy, music by Jacques Offenbach, Théâtre des Variétés. Role : Louise
- 1892: Two against one, comedy in one act, by Debelly, Théâtre des Variétés
- 1892: Remorse of Gideon, comedy in one act, by Marc Sonal and Victor Gréhon, Theater of Variety. Role : Hermance
- 1892: La Souricière, comedy in three acts, by Alexandre Bisson and Albert Carré, Théâtre des Variétés. Role : Charlotte
- 1893: Les brigands, opera in three acts, by Henri Meilhac and Ludovic Halévy, music by Jacques Offenbach, Théâtre des Variétés . Role : Zerlina
- 1893: Modes à latresol, vaudeville by Marc Sonal and Victor Gréhon, Théâtre des Variétés. Role : Virginia
- 1894: The Heroic The Cardunois, play in three acts, of Alexandre Bisson, theater of the Varieties. Role : Rosalie
- 1894: Gentil Bernard or the Art of Love, a five-act comedy mixed with verses, by Philippe Dumanoir (Philippe-François Pinel, says) and Clairville (Louis-François-Marie Nicolai, says), Variety Theater. Role : Manon
- 1894: Madame la Commissaire, vaudeville in three acts, from Henri Chivot and Henry Bocage (Henry Tousez, says), Théâtre des Variétés. Role : Louisette
- 1894: The First husband of France, vaudeville in three acts, of Albin Valabrègue, theater of Variety. Role : Clara
- 1894: La Glissade, comedy in three acts, by Max Maurey (Marx Rapoport, says) and Augustin Thierry (son of Gilbert Augustin-Thierry), Comédie-Parisienne Theater. Role : Julie
- 1894: Mam'zelle Nitouche, play in four acts, by Henri Meilhac and Albert Millaud, music by Hervé (Louis -Auguste-Florimond Ronger, says), Variety Theater. Role : Lydie
- 1894: La Rieuse, a three-act play by Ernest Blum and Raoul Toché, music by Hervé (Louis-Auguste-Florimond Ronger, said), Variety Theater. Role : Lise
- 1895: The Diary of the Devil, a fantastic piece in five acts and eight tableaux by Ernest Blum and Paul Ferrier, music by Gaston Serpette, theater varieties. Role : Hyacinth
- 1895: Chilperic, opera eaten in three acts and four tableaux, by Hervé (Louis-Auguste-Florimond Ronger, says) and Paul Ferrier, music by Hervé, Variety Theater. Role : Hennengarde
- 1896: The Punctured Eye, opera in three acts, by Hervé (Louis-Auguste-Florimond Ronger, says), theater of varieties. Role : Éclosine
- 1897: Paris qui marche, revue in 3 acts, 10 paintings, by Hector Monréal and Henri Blondeau, music of Henri Chatau (which composes especially for this review, the famous song, Frou-frou), theater of the Varieties. Roles : Raphaëlle, A little lady, A lady of the Restoration, Bengaline.
- 1898: Le Nouveau Jeu, a comedy in five acts and seven tableaux by Henri Lavedan, Théâtre des Variétés. Role : Riquiqui
- 1899: Forward: Smart!, Fantasy (revue) by Jules Oudot and Henry de Gorsse, cabaret of songwriters: Tréteau de Tabarin at 58 rue Pigalle. Role : the Divette
- 1900: Between court and garden, fantasy-revue in one act of Émile Duranthon and Paul Delay, théâtre des Mathurins. Role : The Commere
- 1900: Mignardise, fantasy in one act, by Michel Carré son and Frédéric Febvre, music by Francis Thomé, Capucine Theater. Role : Mignardise
- 1900: Prince's Education, a four-act play by Maurice Donnay, at the Théâtre des Variétés. Role : Mariette Spring
- 1900: Les brigands (reprise), opéra in three acts, by Henri Meilhac and Ludovic Halévy, music of Jacques Offenbach, Variety Theater. Role : Duke of Mantua
- 1900: La belle Hélène (reprise), opera in three acts by Henri Meilhac and Ludovic Halévy, music by Jacques Offenbach, Théâtre des Variétés. Role : Oreste
- 1900: Le carnet du Diable (reprise), faerie-operetta in three acts and ten tableaux by Ernest Blum and Paul Ferrier, music of Gaston Serpette, Variety Theater. Role : Sataniella
- 1901: Napoli, four-act ballet in Paul Milliet, music by Franco Alfano, staging and choreography by Mrs Mariquita (Marie-Thérèse Gamalery, so-called), under the direction of Édouard Marchand, theater director of the Folies Bergère. Role : La Parisienne
- 1901: The Works of Hercules, Opera in 3 acts of Gaston Arman de Caillavet and Robert de Flers, music of Claude Terrasse, Bouffes-Parisiens theater. Role : the queen Omphale
- 1901: Lili and Tonton, a play by Léon Jancey at the Mathurins Theater. Role : Julie de Vimeuse
- 1902: Madame la Présidente, operetta in 3 acts, by Paul Ferrier and Auguste Germain, music by Edmond Diet, bouffes-Parisians. Role : Reseda.
- 1903: La Revue à poivre, reviewed in eight tableaux by E.P. Lafargue at La Scala. Role : Beguinette
- 1904: Mam'zelle 5 Louis or Mam'zelle Five Louis, fantasy-operetta in three acts and five tableaux by Armand Tillet says Claude Roland and Hippolyte Gaetan Chapoton said Serge Basset, music of Louis Bernard-Saraz said Ludovic Ratz, Café-concert Parisiana. Role : Mam'zelle Five Louis
- 1905: La Petite Milliardaire by Henri Dumay
- 1905: Heart of Sparrow, of Louis Artus, Theater of the Athenee
- 1906: Le Paradis de Mahomet, an operetta in three acts and four tableaux by Henri Blondeau, music by Robert Planquette, Variety Theater. Role : Fathmé
- 1906: La Ponette by Louis Artus
- 1907: The Coup de Jarnac by Henry de Gorsse and Maurice de Marsan
- 1907: Des Lys here and there, delight, revue in one act by Jean Meudrot and Paul Bail, Théâtre de la Comédie-Royale. Roles : Fleur de Lys and the Ecaillère and an imitation of Jacasse
- 1907: Love in the bank, comedy in three acts of Louis Artus, theater of the Varieties. Role : Caroline
- 1908: The King, comedy in four acts by Robert de Flers, Gaston Arman de Caillavet and Emmanuel Arène, theater varieties. Role : Suzette Bourdier
- 1909: Crainquebille, a play in three tableaux by Anatole France, Théâtre du Châtelet. Role: a worker
- 1909: 24 October, 530e and last performance of the comedy, The King, at the Théâtre des Variétés.
- 1909: Le Circuit, a three-act play by Georges Feydeau and Francis de Croisset, Théâtre des Variétés. Role : Gabrielle
- 1910: At the time of the crusades, operetta by Franc-Nohain and Claude Terrasse, Palais de la Bourse, as part of the Feast of the Exchange Agent Company. Role : The chatelaine
- 1910: Our Women, vaudeville in three acts by Pierre Filhol, Théâtre des Folies-Dramatiques. Role: Chichette
- 1911: La Vie parisienne (reprise), opera in four acts by Henri Meilhac and Ludovic Halévy, music by Jacques Offenbach, Théâtre des Variétés. Role : Swedish Baroness
- 1911: Les Midinettes, by Louis Artus
- 1912: Happiness at the hand by Paul Gavault
- 1917: Béguinette, Variety Theater
- 1918: La Dame de Monte-Carlo by Georges Léglise and Edmond Pingrin, music by Germaine Raynal and Hubert Mouton, Théâtre des Variétés
- 1919: I want to have a Child, Théâtre de l'Ambigu-Comique
- 1921: The King, by Gaston Arman de Caillavet, Robert de Flers and Emmanuel Arène, Variety Theater. Role : Youyou
- 1922: La Belle Angevine by Maurice Donnay and André Rivoire, Théâtre des Variétés.

== Filmography ==
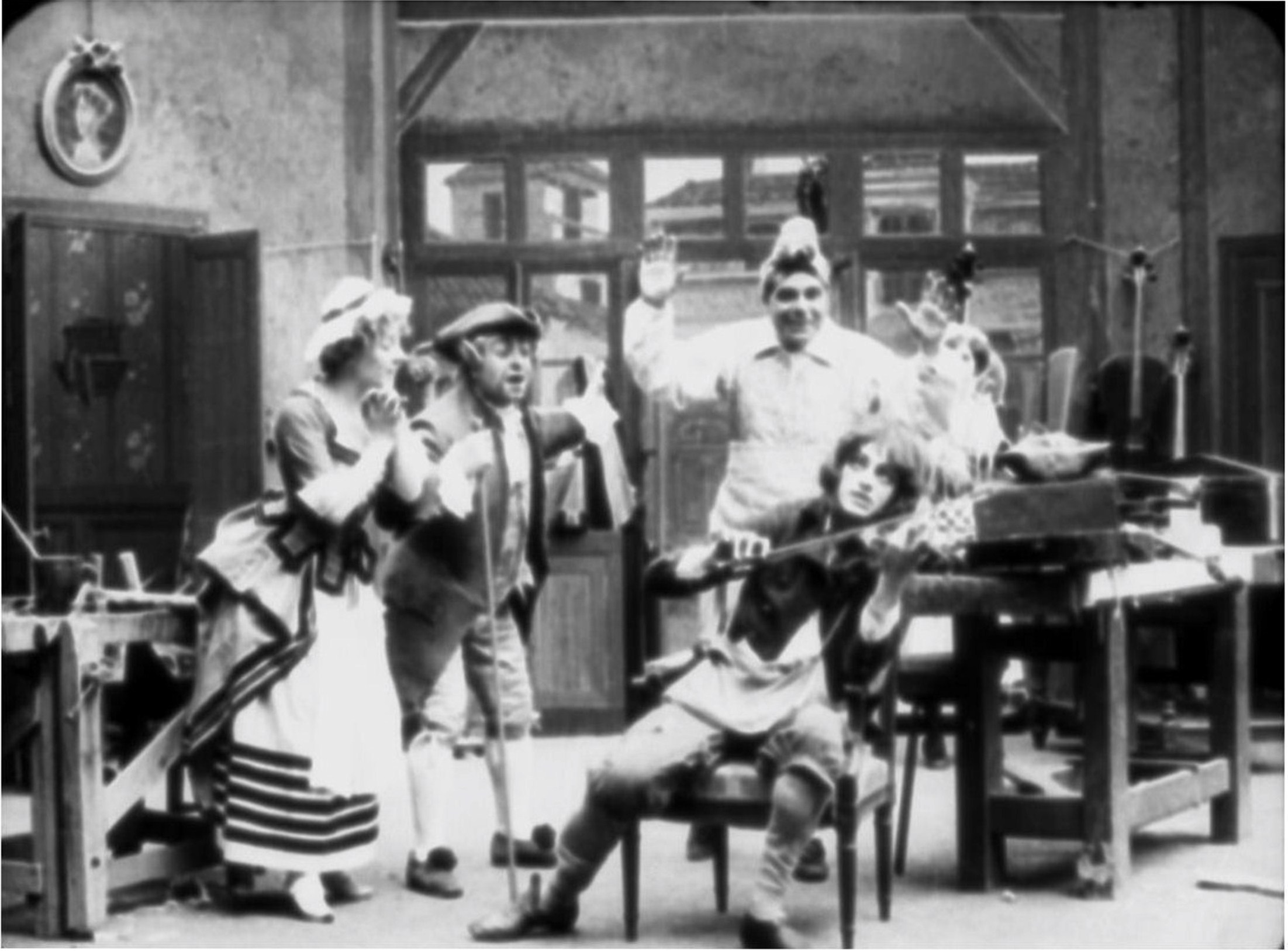
Amélie Diéterle on the left, in the silent film, The luthier of Cremona, by Albert Capellani in 1909. Role : Giannina.

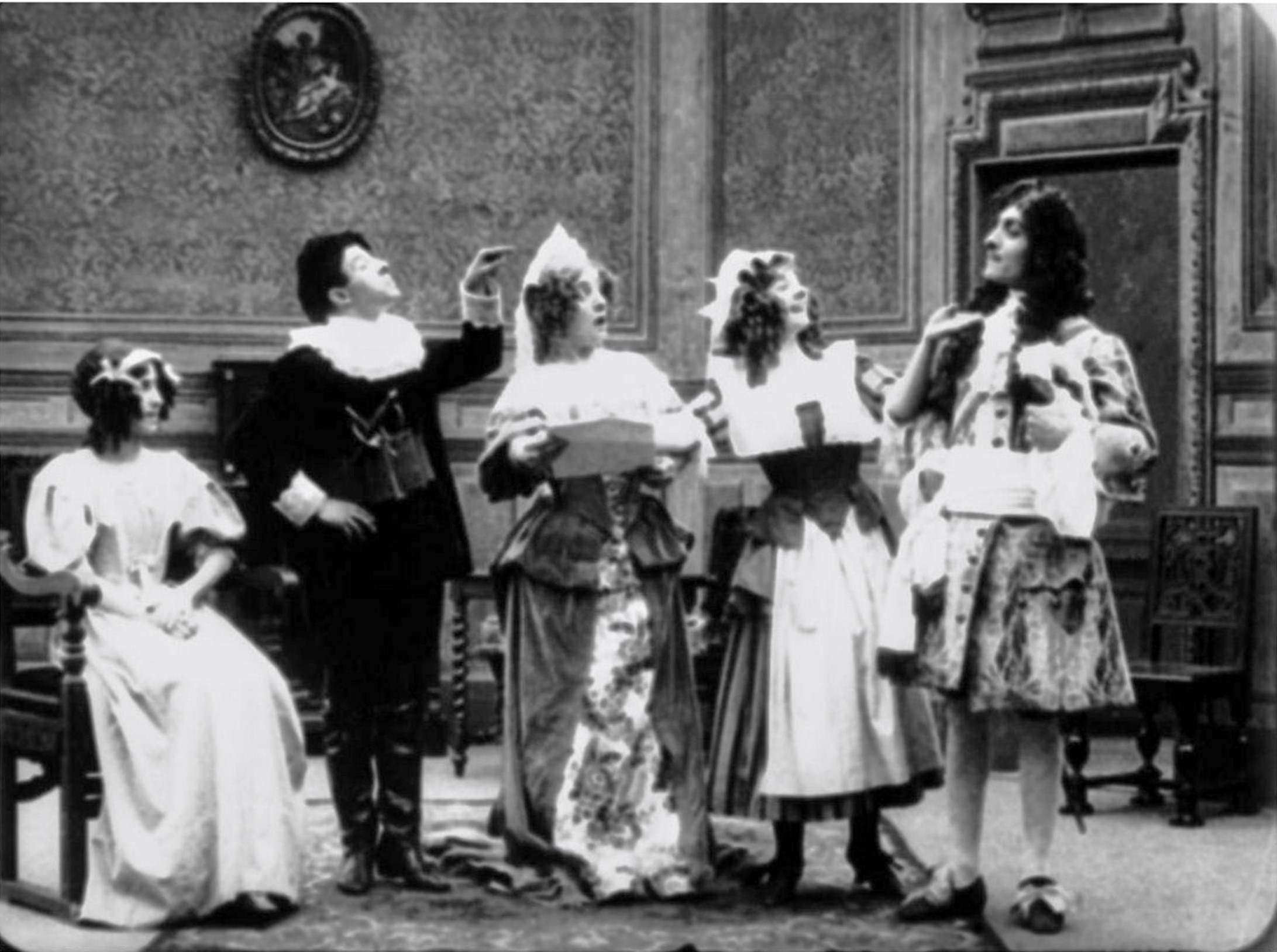
Amélie Diéterle on the right on the photograph, in The universal legatee, by André Calmettes in 1909.

- 1909: Femme de chambre improvisée, by Georges Monca
- 1909: Jim Blackwood jockey, by Georges Monca
- 1909: The two burglars, by Georges Monca
- 1909: The maker of Cremona, by Albert Capellani
- 1909: The universal legatee, by André Calmettes
- 1910: Mimi Pinson (or Miss Pinson), by Georges Monca. Role : Mimi Pinson
- 1910: The Christmas of the Painter, by Georges Monca
- 1910: The cicada and the ant by Georges Monca
- 1910: The cat metamorphosed into a woman, by Michel Carré. Role: Kato
- 1911: The living dead by Michel Carré
- 1911: The rival duped, by Michel Carré. Role: The bride
- 1911: Rigadin burglar, by Georges Monca
- 1911: Boubouroche, by Georges Monca
- 1911: Rigadin and the recalcitrant tenant, by Georges Monca
- 1911: The Nose of Rigadin, by Georges Monca
- 1911: The Disadvantages of Rigadin, by Georges Monca
- 1912: Rigadin explorer, by Georges Monca
- 1912: Rigadin and the aunt to the inheritance, by Georges Monca. Role : The aunt
- 1912: The household of Rigadin, by Georges Monca
- 1912: Rigadin and the recalcitrant divorcee, by Georges Monca
- 1912: The three sultanas, by Adrien Caillard. Role : Roxelane
- 1912: Rigadin between two flames, by Georges Monca
- 1912: Rigadin in the Balkans, by Georges Monca
- 1913: The vengeful fire, by Georges Monca. Role : Countess of Grandchamp

== Bibliography ==
- Sulser, Eleonore (25 June 2011). "Paul Gallimard, the forgotten genius of the dynasty". Le Temps (in French). Lausanne.
- Martin-Fugier, Anne (15 February 2007). 19th century artist life (in French). Paris: Éditions Louis Audibert. p. 387 (total pages : 480). ISBN 978-2-84749-084-8.
- Richard, Jacques (1 November 2002). "Prince Rigadin et Son Monde". Collection Revue Archives (in French). No. 92. Éditions of the Jean Vigo Institute. Archived from the original on 12 August 2018.
- Maurois, Michelle (14 May 1986). Burning Ashes (in French). Paris: Flammarion Éditions. p. 0 (total pages : 576). ISBN 978-2-08064-888-4. Archived from the original on 12 June 2018.
- Coursaget, René; Gauthier, Maximilien; Holbane, Françoise; Bauër, Gérard (1947). One hundred years of theater by photography: comedians and comedians of yesterday (in French). Paris: Éditions l'Image, Presses de Maitre-Imprimeur Aulard. p. 141.
- Verneuil, Louis (1944). neuf o'clock curtain: theater memories (in French). New York City: Éditions of the French House (Rockefeller Center) and Editions of Deux-Rives (Paris). p. 0 (total pages : 460).
- Delini, Jules (1 July 1922). "Miss Dieterle (Amélie Laurent, so-called)". Our headings: 300 anecdotal biographies of dramatic and lyric artists (in French). Paris: Éditions Joë Bridge. p. 94 (total pages : 312).
- Noël, Édouard; Stoullig, Edmond (1892–1914). The Annals of Theater and Music (in French). Paris: Éditions Georges Charpentier, Berger-Levrault Publishing, Éditions Paul Ollendorff – Société d'Éditions littéraires et artistiques. p. 0 (total pages : 550).
- Risacher, Émile (1903). "Miss Amélie Diéterle, dramatic and lyric artist". Directory of Artists and Dramatic and Musical Education (in French). Paris: Éditions A. Maréchal. p. 545 at 546 (total pages : 1460).
- Lepelletier, Edmond; Rochel, Clément (8 June 1898). The loves of Don Juan. collection Excelsior (in French). Paris: Éditions Karl Nilsson and Per Lamm. p. 7 (total pages : 229).
