= Still Life: Vase with Pink Roses =

1890 painting by Vincent van Gogh

Vase with Pink Roses
- Artist: Vincent van Gogh
- Year: 1890
- Catalogue: F681; JH1976
- Medium: Oil on canvas
- Dimensions: 71 cm × 90 cm (28 in × 35 in)
- Location: National Gallery of Art; Washington, D.C.
- Accession: 1991.67.1

Still Life: Vase with Pink Roses is an oil painting by Vincent van Gogh, painted in Saint-Rémy in 1890. At the time of its creation, Van Gogh was readying himself to leave the Saint-Paul de Mausole asylum for the quiet town of Auvers-sur-Oise outside of Paris. This and the similarly-dated Pink Roses reflect the optimism Van Gogh felt at that time about his future, both in his choice of flowers as a subject and the colors used. The painting is owned by the National Gallery of Art in Washington, D.C.

== The painting ==
Van Gogh painted Still Life: Vase with Pink Roses shortly before his release from the Saint-Rémy asylum.

As the end of his stay in Saint-Rémy and the days ahead in Auvers-sur-Oise neared, Van Gogh conveyed his optimism and enthusiasm by painting flowers. About the time that Van Gogh painted this work, he wrote to his mother, "But for one's health, as you say, it is very necessary to work in the garden and see the flowers growing." To his sister Wil he wrote, "The last days in Saint-Rémy I worked like a madman. Great bouquets of flowers, violet-colored irises, great bouquets of roses."

While it is not believed that Van Gogh has a specific association for roses, the National Gallery of Art (NGA) asserts, "it is clear, though, that he saw all blossoming plants as celebrations of birth and renewal—as full of life. That sense is underscored here by the fresh green of the background, which has the delicate color of new leaves in spring." NGA further describes the painting, "The undulating ribbons of paint, applied in diagonal strokes, animate the canvas and play off the furled forms of flowers and leaves. Originally, the roses were pink—the color has faded—and would have created a contrast of complementary colors with the green."

The painting is one of several Van Gogh examples of overabundance in still life, filling the picture plane with the vase and overflowing flowers. Other examples are Still Life with Carnations and Still Life with Anemones. The exuberant bouquet of roses is said to be one of Van Gogh's largest, most beautiful still life paintings. Van Gogh made another painting of roses in Saint-Rémy, which is on display at the Metropolitan Museum of Art in New York.

When Van Gogh left Saint-Rémy on May 16 both rose paintings with very thick paint were left behind to dry. Van Gogh anticipated that it would take one month for the paintings to dry; they arrived in Van Gogh's last residence in Auvers-sur-Oise by June 24.

== Flowers as a subject ==
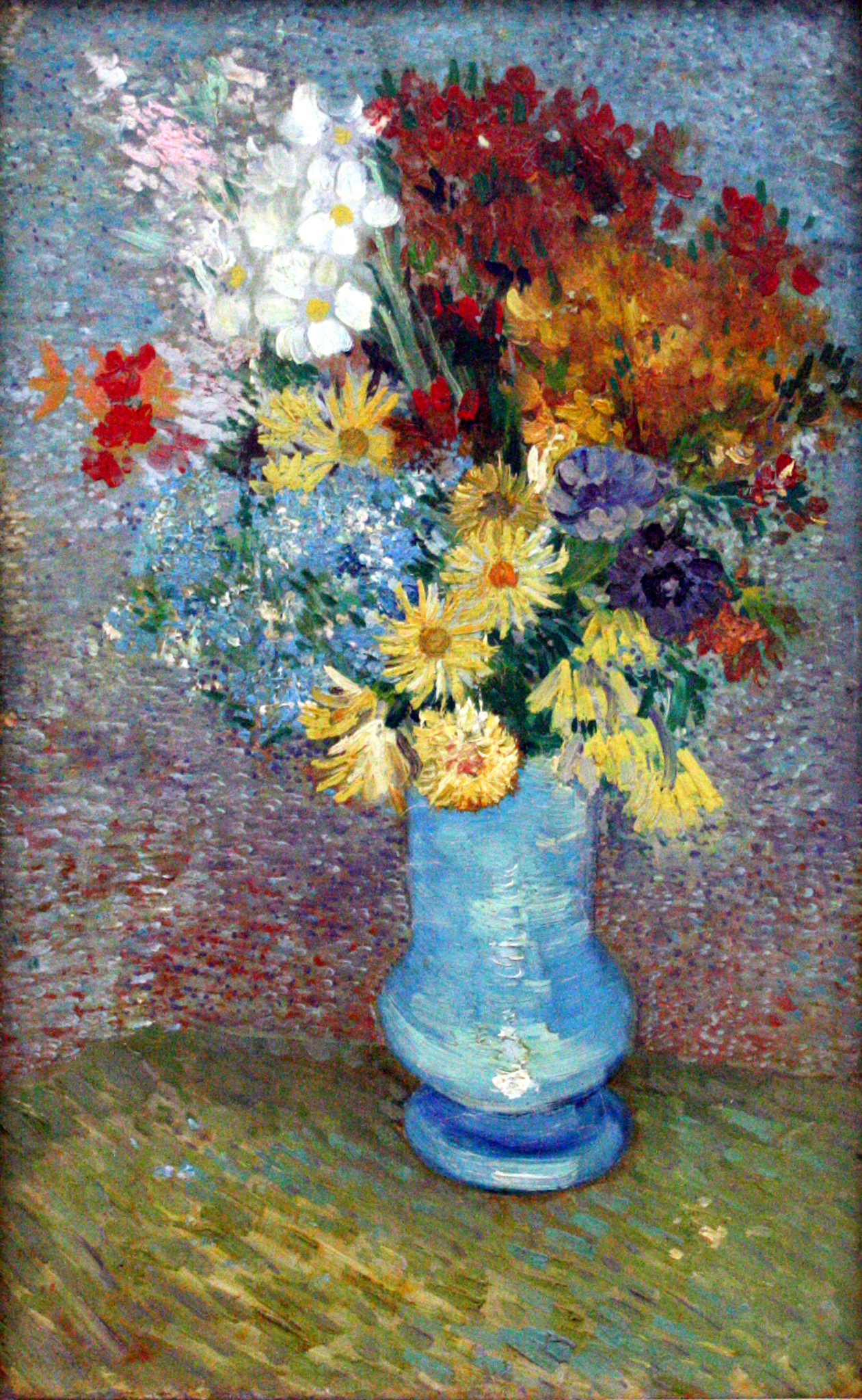
Vincent van Gogh's Flowers in a Blue Vase, about 1889-1890

Flowers were the subject of many of Van Gogh's paintings in Paris, due in great part to his regard for flowers. As said to his brother, "You will see that by making a habit of looking at Japanese pictures you will come to love to make up bouquets and do things with flowers all the more." To his sister, Wil, Van Gogh advised her to cultivate her own garden, like Voltaire's Candide, to find joy and meaning in life. After he left Paris and settled in Arles Van Gogh painted his second group of Sunflowers in 1888 and 1889. His paintings of sunflowers in vases are among his most well known paintings.

In Paris friends and acquaintances sent bouquets of flowers weekly for his still life paintings. He also purchased bouquets inexpensively, choosing a variety of flowers and colors for his paintings. In a letter to his sister Wil he said, "Last year I painted almost nothing but flowers so I could get used to colors other than grey - pink, soft or bright green, light blue, violet, yellow, glorious red." That was an exaggeration, as during his time in Paris he painted 230 paintings, about 30 of which were flowers. Yet, the comment demonstrates his interest in painting flowers as a subject and to further develop his appreciation and understanding of color.

== Color theory and technique ==
In Still Life: Vase with Pink Roses the audience can see Van Gogh's keen awareness of the interplay of color that he acquired over time, especially if one can imagine the original, deeper pink of the roses on the complementary green of the painting for dramatic and emotional effect. The choice of colors, and the manner in which they are painted, is also meaningful.

=== Law of simultaneous contrast ===
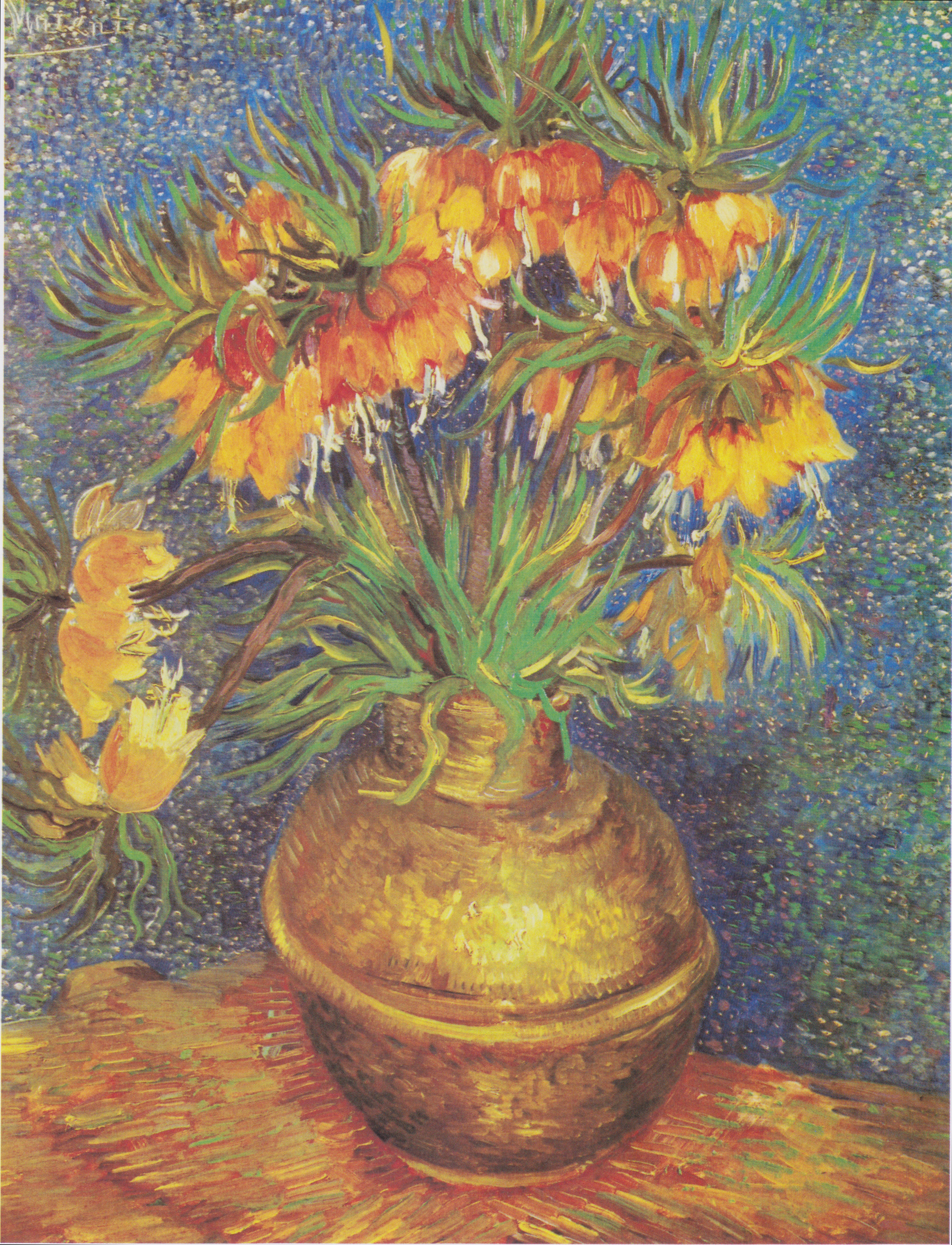
Vincent van Gogh, Crown Imperial Fritillaries in a Copper Vase, 1886

Van Gogh used complementary, contrasting colors to bring an intensity to his paintings, which evolved over the periods of his work. Two complementary colors of the same degree of vividness and brightness placed next to one another produce an intense reaction, called the "law of simultaneous contrast."

From his days in the Netherlands Van Gogh became familiar with Delacroix's color theory and was fascinated by color. Like Delacroix, his theory about color came through the observation of nature. He said of Delacroix that he "makes us feel the life of things, and the expression of movement, that he absolutely dominates his colors."

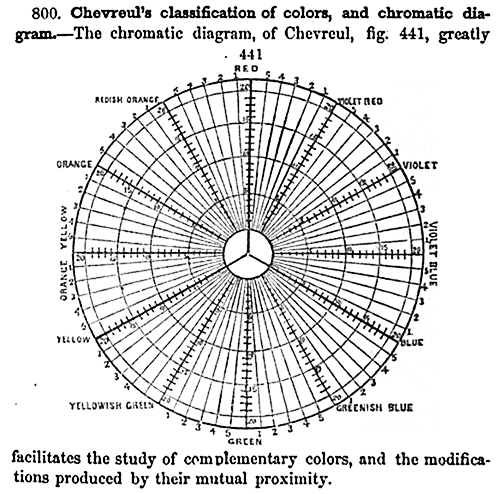
Chevreul's 1855 "chromatic diagram" based on the RYB color model, showing complementary colors and other relationships

While in Nuenen Van Gogh became familiar with Michel Eugène Chevreul's laws in weaving to maximize the intensity of colors through their contrast to adjacent colors.

Van Gogh eagerly studied Seurat's use of complementary colors in Paris. Excited to try out complementary studies, Van Gogh would divide a large canvas into several rectangular sections, trying out "all the colors of the rainbow." There he was also exposed through his brother Theo to Adolphe Monticelli's still life work with flowers, which he admired. First, he saw Monticelli's use of color as an expansion of Delacroix's theories of color and contrast. Secondly he admired the effect Monticelli created by heavy application of paint.

Van Gogh mentioned the liveliness and interplay of "a wedding of two complementary colors, their mingling and opposition, the mysterious vibrations of two kindred souls," such as "pinks marrying the greens" (French: les roses... se mariant aux verts) as in this painting.

=== Color meaning ===
Author Robert Wallace wrote that Van Gogh "sensed that color has meaning that transcends mere visual impressions... that color and emotions are interrelated." Van Gogh used color strategically and forcefully. Color is "not true from a delusive realist, but color suggesting some emotion of an ardent temperament," wrote Van Gogh.

He observed nature and mood changes with the seasonal cycle of life, expressed with complementary colors specific to each season:

- For spring, green and pink.
- Summer, blue and orange and yellow, gold.
- Autumn, yellow and violet.
- Winter, white with black silhouettes.

To his brother Theo, Van Gogh wrote, "What color is in a picture, enthusiasm is in life."

== Provenance ==
- Art collector Paul Gallimard (1850-1929) of Paris owned the painting as of 1905. The painting is not described in Louis Vauxcelles, "Collection M.P. Gallimard," Les Arts (September 1908).
- In the private collection of Bernheim-Jeune of Paris from at least 1917. It was lent by Bernheim-Jeune to a 1917 exhibition in Zurich.
- Sold 1929 to Alex Reid & Lefèvre, London.
- Acquired in 1929 by W. Averell Harriman. Exhibited by the Marie Harriman Gallery in 1930 and also lent out the same year for an exhibition in Buffalo, New York.
- In 1991 the painting was given by Mr. and Mrs. W. Averell Harriman of New York to the National Gallery of Art in Washington, D.C.

The painting was valued at $60 million when it was given to the National Gallery of Art by Pamela Harriman in the memory of her husband.

== See also ==
- List of works by Vincent van Gogh
