= Pink Rose (disambiguation) =

Pink Rose may refer to:

- Pachliopta kotzebuea, a species of butterfly
- Pink Rose, a Finnish political association
- Sabatia angularis, a plant native to the United States
- Pink Roses, a late painting by Vincent van Gogh
