= Auguste Germain =

French playwright, novelist and journalist (1862–1915)

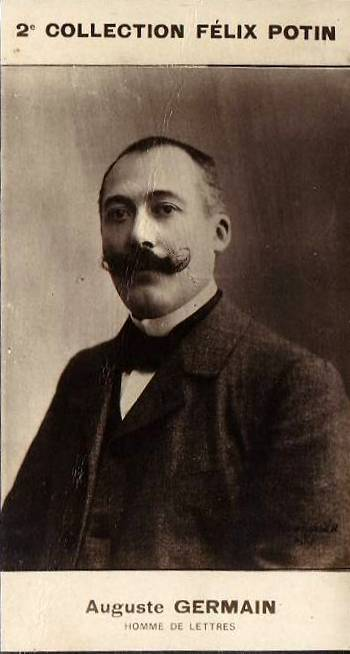
Auguste Germain

Auguste Germain (22 January 1862 – 13 December 1915) was a French playwright, novelist and journalist.

== Life ==
Born in Paris, Germain was a prolific author who wrote numerous plays, several novels, collections of correspondence and biographies.

He collaborated in several literary journals, such as the "Nu au salon" and l'Écho de Paris, where he wrote the theatrical gazette under the pseudonym of Captain Fracasse.

== Plays ==
- 1894: Famille !, three acts comedy, Théâtre du Gymnase, (30 January 1894)
- 1895: Volte-face, one act play, éditions H. Simonis Empis
- 1897: Argument de Phryné, ballet in three scenes, from the program of the Folies Bergère, text by Auguste germain, music by Louis Ganne
- 1898: Les Chaussons de danse, one act comedy, Théâtre des Variétés (27 September 1898)
- 1899: Nuit d'été, one act comedy, Théâtre des Variétés (25 September 1899)
- 1899: L'amour pleure et rit, three acts comedy, Théâtre de l'Athénée (25 October 1899)
- 1901: En fête, 5 act comedy, Théâtre de l'Athénée (25 January 1901).
- 1901: Le Bonheur qui passe, one act comedy, Comédie-française (21 May 1901)
- 1905: On réclame !..., one act comedy co-written with Robert Trébor, Théâtre Molière (4 May 1905)
- 1905: Fred, comedy in three acts co-written with Robert Trébor, Théâtre des Bouffes du Nord (31 October 1905)
- 1906: Irrésistible, comédie, Théâtre des Nouveautés le (6 March 1906)
- 1906: L'Attente, one act comedy co-written with Robert Trébor, Théâtre de l'Odéon (16 May 1906)
- 1907: Marcheuse !, one act comedy, Théâtre des Capucines (10 April 1907)
- 1908: Miousic, one act comedy, Théâtre Mévisto (1 March 1908)
- 1908: La petite femme forte, one act comedy co-written with Robert Trébor, Comédie-Royale (12 October 1908)
- 1908: L'Éclipse, one act play, Théâtre Mévisto
- 1909: En trombe !, one act comedy, éditions Fayard, Paris, 1909
- 1909: Guerre, adaptation of the play in 3 acts by Robert Reinert, Théâtre Antoine

== Novels ==
- 1887: Christiane, robes et manteaux, éditions J. Levy, Paris, 1887, 350 p.
- 1890: Les recettes de cuisine théâtrale de M. Sésosthène Rabichon, éditions Ernest Kolb, Paris, 1890, 61 p.
- 1891: Les Dessous du théâtre. Les Agences dramatiques et lyriques, éditions Perrin, Paris, 1891, foreword by Emile Bergerat.
- 1891: L'Agité, éditions Perrin, Paris, 1891, 251 p.
- 1892: Scènes de la vie théâtrale. Bichette, éditions Ernest Kolb, Paris, 1892, 275 p.
- 1893: À toutes brides, éditions Perrin, Paris, 1893, 330 p.
- 1893: Nos princes..., éditions E. Kolb, Paris, 1893, 280 p.
- 1895: Théâtreuses, éditions H. Simonis Empis, Paris, 1895, 173 p.
- 1896: La Valse parisienne, illustrations by Hermann Paul, éditions H. Simonis Empis, Paris, 1896, 282 p.
- 1897: Chantez les baisers..., éditions H. Simonis Empis, Paris, 1897, 276 p.
- 1898: Albert Brasseur, éditions F. Juven, Paris, 1898, 96 p.
- 1898: Polichinelles, éditions H. Simonis Empis, Paris, 1898, 263 p.
- 1898: Petite chatte, éditions F. Juven, Paris, 1898, 125 p.
- 1900: Les Étoilés, éditions H. Simonis Empis, Paris, 1900, 282 p.
- 1901: La Belle Hélène, éditions Librairie moderne, Paris, 1901, 967 p.
- 1901: Le Carillon de Paris, éditions H. Simonis Empis, Paris, 1901, 284 p.
- 1903: Les Paradis, Ouvrage orné de 30 compositions de L. Le Riverend, éditions A. Méricant, Paris, 1903, 349 p.
- 1907: Dames patronnesses, roman passionnel..., éditions A. Méricant, Paris, 1907, 332 p.
- 1909: L'Angoissant mystère, éditions A. Méricant, Paris, 1909, 240 p.
- 1909: Les Maquillés, roman de mœurs théâtrales, éditions Fasquelle, Paris, 1909, 308 p.
- 1922: Mme Brazyers, antiquaire, éditions Fasquelle, Paris, 1922, 246 p. (édité post-mortem).

== Poetry ==
- 100 Sonnets pour Jeanne (1902)
