= Paul Gallimard =

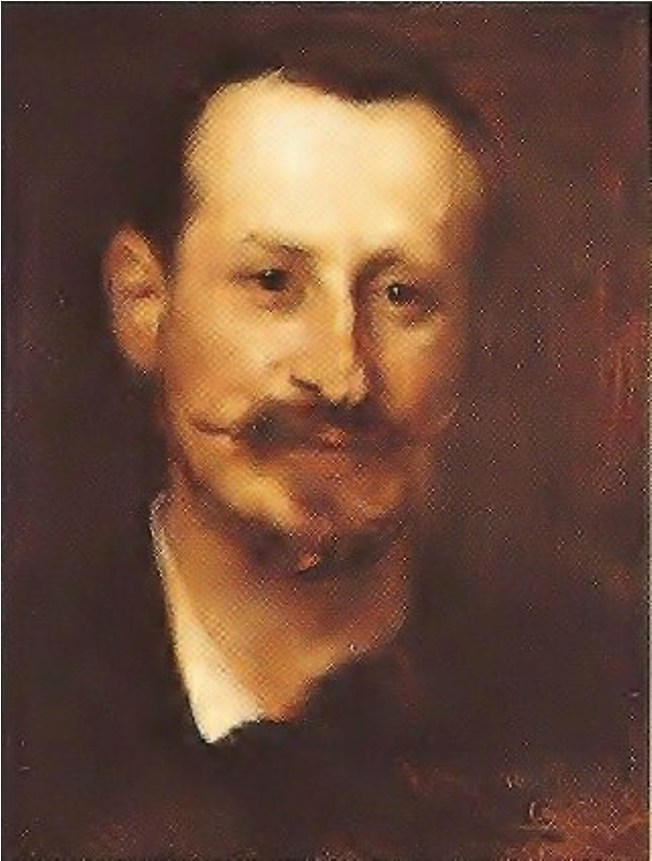
- Portrait of Paul Gallimard by Eugène Carrière (c. 1887 or 1889)
- Born: Paul Sébastien Gallimard; 20 July 1850; Suresnes, France
- Died: 9 March 1929 (aged 78); Paris, France
- Education: Lycée Condorcet; École des Beaux-Arts
- Occupations: Art collector; bibliophile; theatre owner; translator
- Spouse: Lucie Duché
- Children: 3, including Gaston Gallimard

Paul Sébastien Gallimard (French pronunciation: [pɔl sebastjɛ̃ ɡalimaʁ]; 20 July 1850 – 9 March 1929) was a French art collector, bibliophile and theatre owner. He was the father of publisher Gaston Gallimard.

== Life and work ==
Paul Gallimard was born in 1850 to businessman Gustave Gallimard and his wife Henriette (née Chabrier). His parents both belonged to wealthy families. His grandfather Sébastien André Gallimard, a trained coppersmith, made his fortune in Paris during the July Monarchy by producing gaslamps for outdoor street lighting. His mother's family owned several Parisian theatres.

Gallimard traveled extensively in his youth, and later became the secretary to the Duc de Morny. Gallimard developed an appreciation for art collecting at an early age through his father's painting collection, which collected together works from the Barbizon school. After completing his education at the Lycée Condorcet, Gallimard studied painting at the École des Beaux-Arts. He also took a dilettante interest in architecture, once drawing architectural design ideas for a museum in Buenos Aires while on a trip to South America. Gallimard did not pursue art as a profession, however, but lived on his inherited fortune. He was the owner of the Théâtre des Variétés and the Théâtre de l'Ambigu-Comique, and several other properties in Paris. He lived in a hôtel particulier at 79 Rue Saint-Lazare in Paris and owned a villa in the seaside resort community of Benerville-sur-Mer on the English Channel. It was called the "Villa Lucie", named after Gallimard's wife. It is now used as a hotel under the name "Manoir de Benerville".

On 12 April 1880, Gallimard married Lucie Duché, Gallimard's marriage to Lucie Duché, the granddaughter of editor-printer Amédée Guyot. Their union resulted in three sons: Jacques, Gaston and Raymond. In 1888, he commissioned a group portrait painting of the children made by Eugène Carrière. In the same year, Carrière also created a portrait of Paul Gallimard with the dedication "À mon bon ami Paul Gallimard" (English: "For my good friend Paul Gallimard"). Carrière also completed a portrait of Gallimard's wife Lucie, who also sat as a model for Pierre-Auguste Renoir in 1892.

Gallimard's mistress was the actress and opera singer Amélie Diéterle, who was twenty-one years his junior. Gallimard was compromised with Diéterle in a scandal which involved fake Rodin sculptures. He was charged with counterfeiting and aiding and abetting by Judge Bonin in 1919. Absent from court at the time of the trial for health reasons, an arrangement took place in 1923 with the donation of a painting by Eugène Carrière to the French State.

Gallimard died on 9 March 1929 in his Rue Saint-Lazare residence. His wife Lucie died at the same location on 2 March 1942.

=== Art collection ===
Gallimard's art collection contained a total of 16 works by his friend Pierre-Auguste Renoir. Gallimard supported the painter financially and in 1892 invited him to travel together to Madrid for a month. Works by the Impressionists made up a large part of his collection, which is composed of more than 100 works. In addition to paintings by Renoir, paintings by Edgar Degas (Avant la course), Berthe Morisot, Claude Monet and Édouard Manet (Suzette Lemaire en face) were part of the collection. Gallimard collected other works, including oil paintings and works on paper, from artists such as Rembrandt van Rijn, El Greco, Jean-Honoré Fragonard, Francisco Goya, Honoré Daumier (Sortie du bateau à lessive), Jean-Baptiste-Camille Corot, Jean-Auguste-Dominique Ingres, Eugène Delacroix and Jean-François Millet. He also collected works by modern artists such as Henri de Toulouse-Lautrec (M. de Lauradour), Édouard Vuillard, Pierre Bonnard, Henri Matisse and Pablo Picasso. The importance of the Gallimard Collection was recognized in 1908 in an article written by the influential art critic Louis Vauxcelles in the magazine Les Arts. After Gallimard's death, the collection was sold by its inheritors.

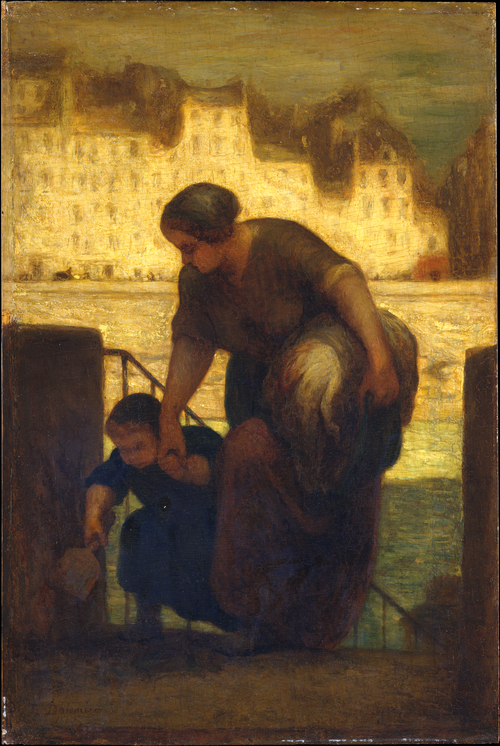
Honoré Daumier:
Sortie du bateau à lessive, c. 1863, Metropolitan Museum of Art, New York

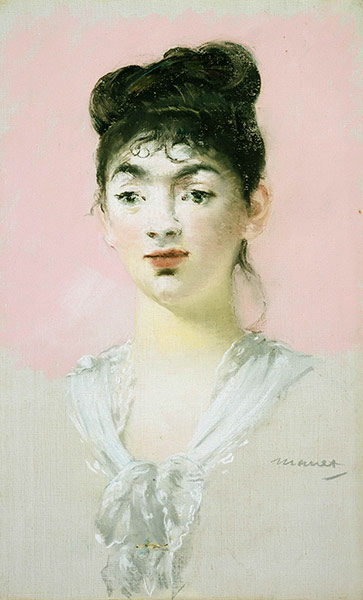
Édouard Manet:
Suzette Lemaire en face, 1881, Private collection

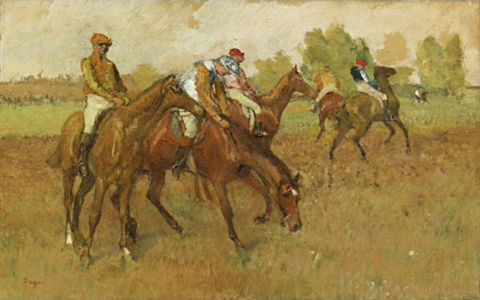
Edgar Degas:
Avant la course, 1882–1888, Private collection

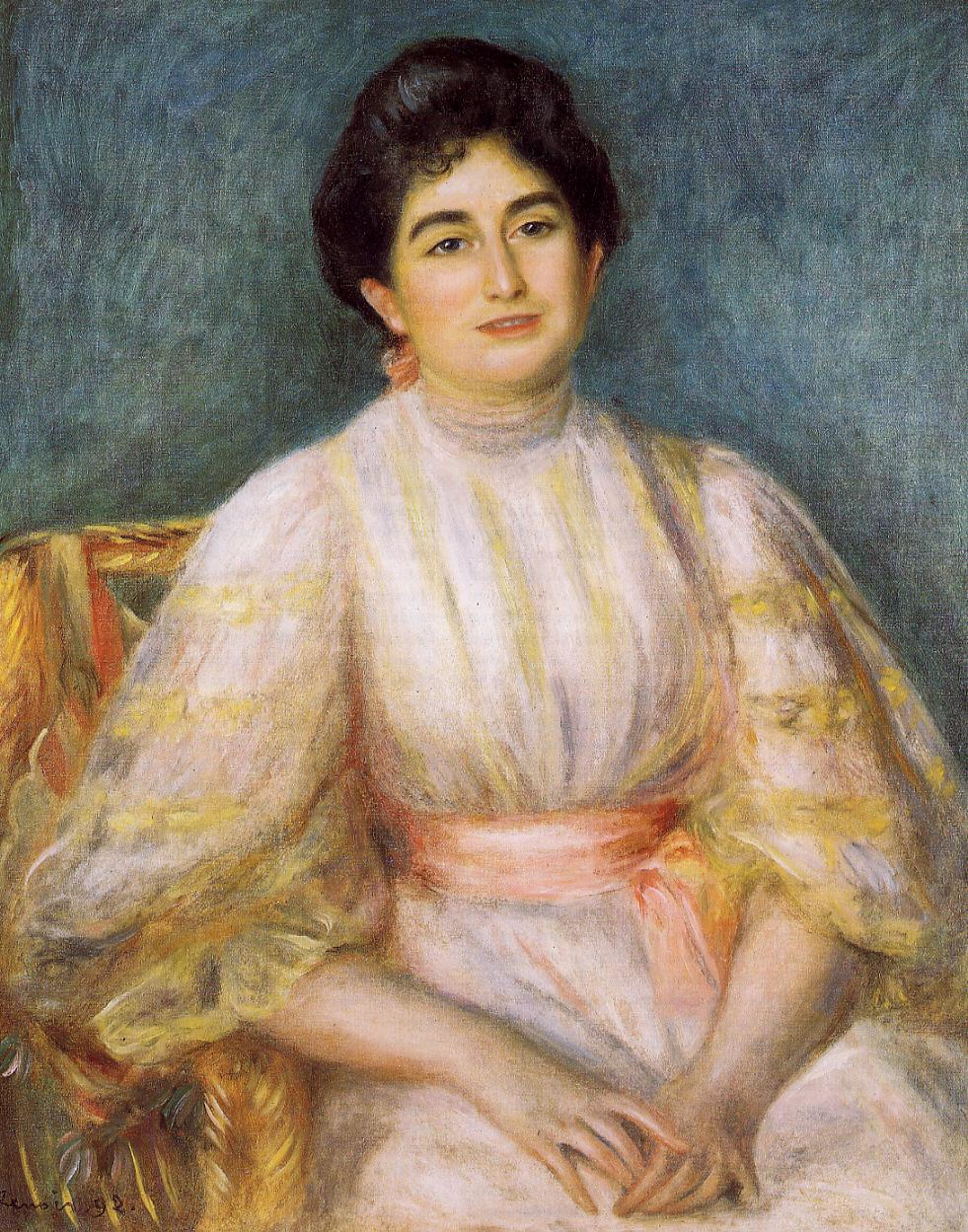
Pierre-Auguste Renoir:
Madame Paul Gallimard (Lucie Gallimard), 1892, Private collection

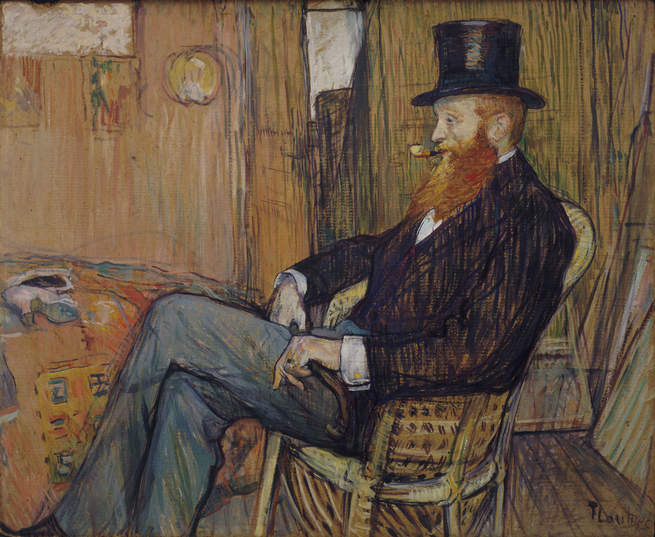
Henri de Toulouse-Lautrec:
M. de Lauradour, 1897, Museum of Modern Art, New York

=== Library ===
In addition to the art collection, Gallimard devoted himself to building an extensive library. He brought together numerous first editions, mostly by French authors of the 19th century. His library also produced expensive limited-edition books, including a limited edition of Germinie Lacerteux (1865) by the Goncourt brothers, which appeared in an edition of only three copies. The book contains original illustrations by Jean-François Raffaëlli and its cover was designed by Eugène Carrière. Other book projects included an elaborately designed edition of Charles Baudelaire's Les Fleurs du mal, which he had adorned with pen drawings Auguste Rodin. Gallimard's library was also sold after his death. He is described as a "bibliophile" by journalist Eléonore Sulser. His passion for books was passed on to his son Gaston Gallimard, who, in 1911, founded the publishing house Éditions Gallimard, which still exists today.

== Publications ==
- Les Étreintes du passé
- Poèmes et Poésies (Translation of John Keats, 1910)
