= Pink Roses =

Painting by Vincent van Gogh

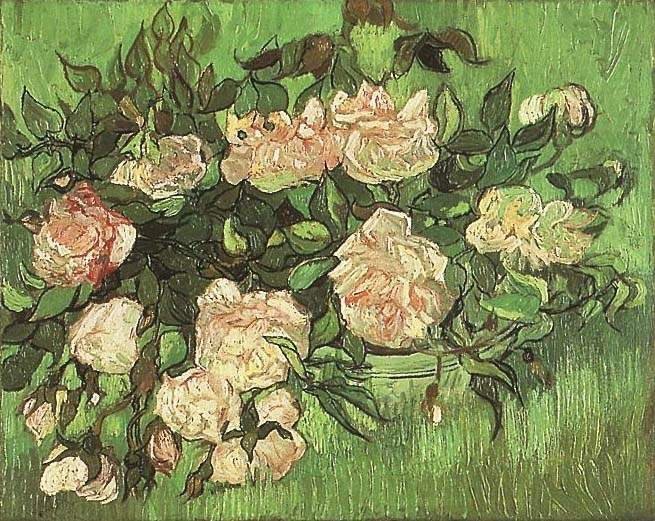
- Artist: Vincent van Gogh
- Year: 1890
- Medium: oil on canvas
- Dimensions: 32 cm × 40.5 cm (13 in × 15.9 in)
- Location: Ny Carlsberg Glyptotek; Copenhagen, Denmark

Pink Roses is an 1890 painting by Vincent van Gogh, one of his last works. It is now in the Ny Carlsberg Glyptotek, to which it was donated by Helga Jacobsen in 1923 - its catalogue number is MIN 1843. It was painted during the last two months of his life, May to July 1890, which he spent in Auvers-sur-Oise.

== See also ==
- List of works by Vincent van Gogh
