= Mariquita (dancer) =

Algerian-born dancer

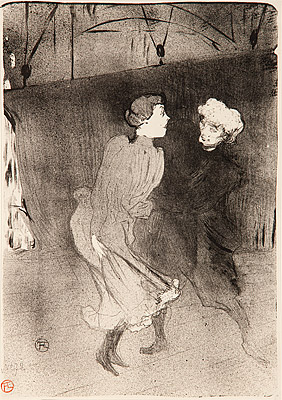
Emilienne d’Alençon and Mariquita, lithograph by Toulouse-Lautrec (1893)

Mariquita, often referred to as Madame Mariquita, (1838/40–1922) was an Algerian-born dancer who became a ballerina, and later a successful choreographer and ballet mistress at various theatres in Paris from the 1870s until 1920. Though best known for her work at the Opéra-Comique, where she was a trailblazer in modernizing French ballet during the 1900s and 1910s, Mariquita also staged popular ballets and divertissements for boulevard theatres and music halls throughout her life. Highly prolific, she created almost 300 ballets over a span of 50 years. While her life and work are not well documented in modern ballet history, contemporaries regarded her as one of the best choreographers of her time, lauding her as “French Fokine,” “model of choreographers,” and “most artistic of all dance-mistresses.”

== Biography ==
Little is known about Mariquita's early life. She was born near Algiers, likely sometime between 1838 and 1840. She is said to have been found by a female dancer as a small child beside a fountain near Aumale in Algeria. She learned to dance even before she could read.

After the death of her adoptive mother, Mariquita was brought to Paris by an impresario. She débuted in Paris in 1845 in a Vaudeville production at the Théâtre des Funambules at the age of seven or eight, under the stage name “Fanny.” In 1855, Jacques Offenbach offered her a contract at his newly opened Théâtre des Bouffes-Parisiens. During the 1850s, she may also have received classical dance training from premier danseur, Antoine Paul, and in 1858 she joined the ballet corps of the Opéra at the rank of sujet de la danse, but only remained for two months despite incurring a fine for prematurely ending her contract. From the Opéra she went to Madrid, where she danced as a première danseuse.

Around 1860, Mariquita returned to Paris and danced in the spectacular féeries at the Porte-Saint-Martin, where she remained for fifteen years. While there, she created roles for Biche au bois, Le Pied du mouton, La Fée aux chèvres, and Le tour du monde en 80 jours, among others. During this time, she also danced for other theatres, including the Théâtre des Variétés and the Folies Bergère.

Mariquita's first work as a choreographer was for the Skating de la Rue Blanche, which had a small theatre. She also began choreographing at the Folies Bergère, collaborating with conductor-composer Olivier Métra on such works as Les Fausses almées, Les Papillons noirs, Les Joujoux, and Les Faunes. By 1880, her work consisted almost exclusively of choreography and teaching: she worked as ballet mistress for the Châtelet, and arranged divertissements for the Skating de la Rue Blanche and the Gaîté-Lyrique. The Gaîté eventually offered her the position of ballet mistress, and she remained in that position for over twenty years into the early 1900s, choreographing such works as Le Grand Mogol, Les Cloches de Corneville, La Fille de Madame Angot, La Poupée, La Jolie Parfumeuse, and Mam’zelle Quat’sous. In 1890, while still working as ballet mistress of the Gaîté, Mariquita was offered a position as ballet mistress for the Folies Bergère. She remained there until 1913, choreographing nearly all of the theatre's 50 ballets during that period.

Mariquita was engaged by Albert Carré as ballet mistress at the Opéra-Comique in 1898 where she remained until 1920, creating some 60 shows, while continuing her role as director of dance at the Folies Bergère. Carré reported that she "knew the dances of every period and from every country." During her tenure at the Opéra-Comique, Mariquita and Carré formed a ballet corps respected as "the most artistic in Paris."

In high demand throughout the 1890s and 1910s, Mariquita was nationally and internationally acclaimed as a choreographer. In 1900, she was appointed choreographic director at the Palais de la Dance at the Exposition Universelle. Mariquita continued to work until she fell ill at around age 80. She retired on April 16, 1920, after an evening attended by the leading artists of the period, completing a career lasting over 70 years. She died on October 5, 1922.

According to Cléo de Mérode, despite her small size, Mariquita was an imposing figure, always standing straight so as not to diminish her height. Wherever she went, she had her lorgnette and her fan with her. She always held her fan in her right hand, using it as a conductor's baton.

== Style ==
Mariquita's choreographic style is difficult to pinpoint; her approach adapted over time and depending on the venue. She was skilled at combining a variety of dances, including character dances, historical dances, classical ballet, dramatic mime, music-hall dances, lascivious dances, and visual tableaux. Mariquita's popular dance choreography was a site of early innovation, perhaps because popular venues allowed for more flexibility and experimentation. Her works at the Folies Bergère were particularly creative, moving away from post-romantic pantomime-ballet. In her music-hall choreography, she often prioritized spectacle and character dance over classical ballet, and she used parody, contemporary dress, and a mixture of academic and popular dance forms—characteristics that would become part of ballet modernism.

Mariquita made many changes to modernize traditional ballet, whose stagnation she publicly criticized. In 1901, she claimed that ballet “had given way to so-called virtuosity,” and that “spectacle was killing ballet.” She is credited with being the first to eschew the traditional tutu, which she thought to be “grotesque,” and with eliminating gymnastics routines from classical ballet. Disliking academic forms of classical ballet, she moved away from standardized steps and poses, instead promoting a more modern dance style with a freer interpretation of the music.

It was in part a desire to break with classical ballet traditions that drove Mariquita to experiment with Ancient Greek-inspired dance at the Opéra-Comique. Although Mariquita began experimenting with this style in popular venues as early as 1897, her most famous Greek dance choreography was done for the Opéra-Comique: productions of Gluck’s Orphée (1899), Iphigénie en Tauride (1900), Alceste (1904), and Iphigénie en Aulide (1907), Thomé’s Endymion et Phoébé (1906), Erlanger’s Aphrodite (1906), and Nouguès' opera-ballet La Danseuse de Pompei (1912). Likely drawing on 1880s academic reconstructions of Greek dance, as well as popular erotic-exotic representations, these choreographies used antiquity as an exotic backdrop for spectacles with mass appeal. By the 1910s, Mariquita had made the Opéra-Comique a centre for innovative choreography.

== Choreography ==
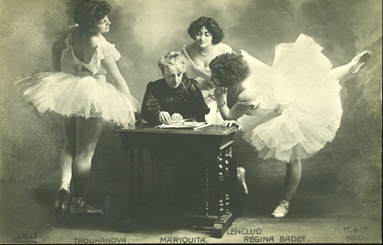
Mariquita (sitting) with Natalia Trouhanova, Marthe Lenclud and Regina Badet

One of the most striking aspects of Mariquita’s career was her ability to choreograph for popular venues even while working for “high art” institutions. She was one of the most prolific female choreographers of her time. Over the course of her career, Mariquita choreographed over 280 works, including nearly 30 ballets and opera divertissements at the Opéra-Comique.

There are records of Mariquita having choreographed the following shows:

Date of Premiere	Title	Theatre	Composer	Librettist
1876	Les Joujoux	Théâtre des Folies-Bergère	Olivier Métra	
1884	Le Grand Mogol	Théâtre des Folies-Bergère	Edmond Audran	Henri Chivot; Alfred Duru
1890	Une Répétition aux Folies-Bergère	Théâtre des Folies-Bergère	Louis Desormes	Mme Mariquita
1893	Fleur de Lotus	Théâtre des Folies-Bergère	Louis Desormes	Armand Silvestre
1893	L'Escarmouche	Théâtre des Folies-Bergère		
1893	L'Arc-en-ciel	Théâtre des Folies-Bergère	Alfred Dubruck	Amédée Moreau
1894	Émilienne aux Quat'z'Arts	Théâtre des Folies-Bergère	Louis Desormes	Georges Courtelinel; Louis Marsolleau
1894	Les Demoiselles du XXe siècle	Théâtre des Folies-Bergère	Louis Desormes	Abel Marcklein; Amédée Moreau
1894	Merveilleuses et gigolettes	Théâtre des Folies-Bergère	Louis Ganne	Jules Jouy; Jacques Lemaire
1895	La Princesse Idaea	Théâtre des Folies-Bergère	Louis Varney	Amédée Moreau
1895	La Belle et la bête	Théâtre des Folies-Bergère	Edmond Diet	Richard O'Monroy (de Saint-Geniès)
1896	Les Cygnes	Théâtre des Folies-Bergère	Georges Jacobi	Joseph Hansen
1896	L'Araignée d'or	Théâtre des Folies-Bergère	Edmond Diet	Jean Lorrain
1896	Chez le couturier	Théâtre des Folies-Bergère	Victor Roger	Paul Louis Flers
1896	Les Cloches de Corneville	Théâtre de la Gaîté	Robert Planquette	Louis Clairville; Charles Gabet
1897	Phryné	Théâtre des Folies-Bergère	Louis Ganne	Auguste Germain
1897	Sports	Théâtre des Folies-Bergère	Gustave Goublier (1er tableau); M. Holzer (2e tableau)	P. L. Flers
1898	L'Enlèvement des Sabines	Théâtre des Folies-Bergère	Paul Marcelles	Adrien Vély; Charles Dutreil
1899	La Princesse au sabbat	Théâtre des Folies-Bergère	Louis Ganne	Jean Lorrain
1899	Cendrillon	Théâtre de l'Opéra-Comique	Jules Massenet	Henri Caïn
1899	Javotte	Théâtre de l'Opéra-Comique	Camille Saint-Saëns	Jean-Louis Croze
1899	Orphée (restaging)	Théâtre de l'Opéra-Comique	Christoph Willibald Gluck	Pierre-Louis Moline
1900	Cythère	Théâtre des Folies-Bergère	Louis Ganne	Auguste Germain
1900	Madame Bonaparte	Théâtre des Folies-Bergère	Georges Pfeiffer	Thierry Lemoine
1900	Terpsichore	Palais de la Danse, Exposition Universelle	Léo Pouget	
1900	L'heure du berger	Palais de la Danse, Exposition Universelle	Louis Ganne	Gaston Arman de Caillavet; Robert de Flers
1900	Iphigénie en Tauride (restaging)	Théâtre de l'Opéra-Comique	Christoph Willibald Gluck	François-Louis Gand Le Bland Du Roullet
1901	Napoli	Théâtre des Folies-Bergère	Franco Alfano	Paul Milliet
1901	Lorenza	Théâtre des Folies-Bergère	Franco Alfano	Rudolphe Darzens
1904	Cigale	Théâtre de l'Opéra-Comique	Jules Massenet	Henri Caïn
1904	Alceste (restaging)	Théâtre de l'Opéra-Comique	Christoph Willibald Gluck	François-Louis Gand Le Bland Du Roullet
1906	Aphrodite	Théâtre de l'Opéra-Comique	Camille Erlanger	Louis de Gramont
1906	Endymion et Phoébé	Théâtre de l'Opéra-Comique	Francis Thomé	
1907	Iphigénie en Aulide (restaging)	Théâtre de l'Opéra-Comique	Christoph Willibald Gluck	François-Louis Gand Le Bland Du Roullet
1910	Les Lucioles	Théâtre de l'Opéra-Comique	Claude Terrasse	
1911	Stella	Théâtre des Folies-Bergère	Claude Terrasse	René Louis; Mme Mariquita
1912	La danseuse de Pompei	Théâtre de l'Opéra-Comique	Jean Nouguès	Henri Caïn; Henry Ferrare
1913	Montmartre	Théâtre des Folies-Bergère	Auguste Bosc	Adolphe Willette
1919	La boîte à joujoux	Théâtre Vaudeville	Claude Debussy (arranged for orchestra by André Caplet)	

== Legacy ==
In the years following her death, Mariquita has largely been forgotten from dance history. In her own lifetime, Mariquita was highly regarded as a dancer, teacher and choreographer. As a dancer, she was respected as one of the best character dancers of the era, but also as a technically skilled ballerina. English dancer Edouard Espinosa listed her as one of “the great outstanding PREMIERES ETOILES” of France. As a ballet mistress and choreographer, she was praised by fellow Parisian artists including Jules Massenet, Louis Delluc, Pierre-Barthélémy Gheusi, and Albert Carré. Upon her death, contemporaries credited her with ushering in a new era of ballet, particularly through her Greek-inspired choreography from 1899 to 1912.

== See also ==
- Women in dance
