= Jane Margyl =

French mezzo-soprano (1874–1907)

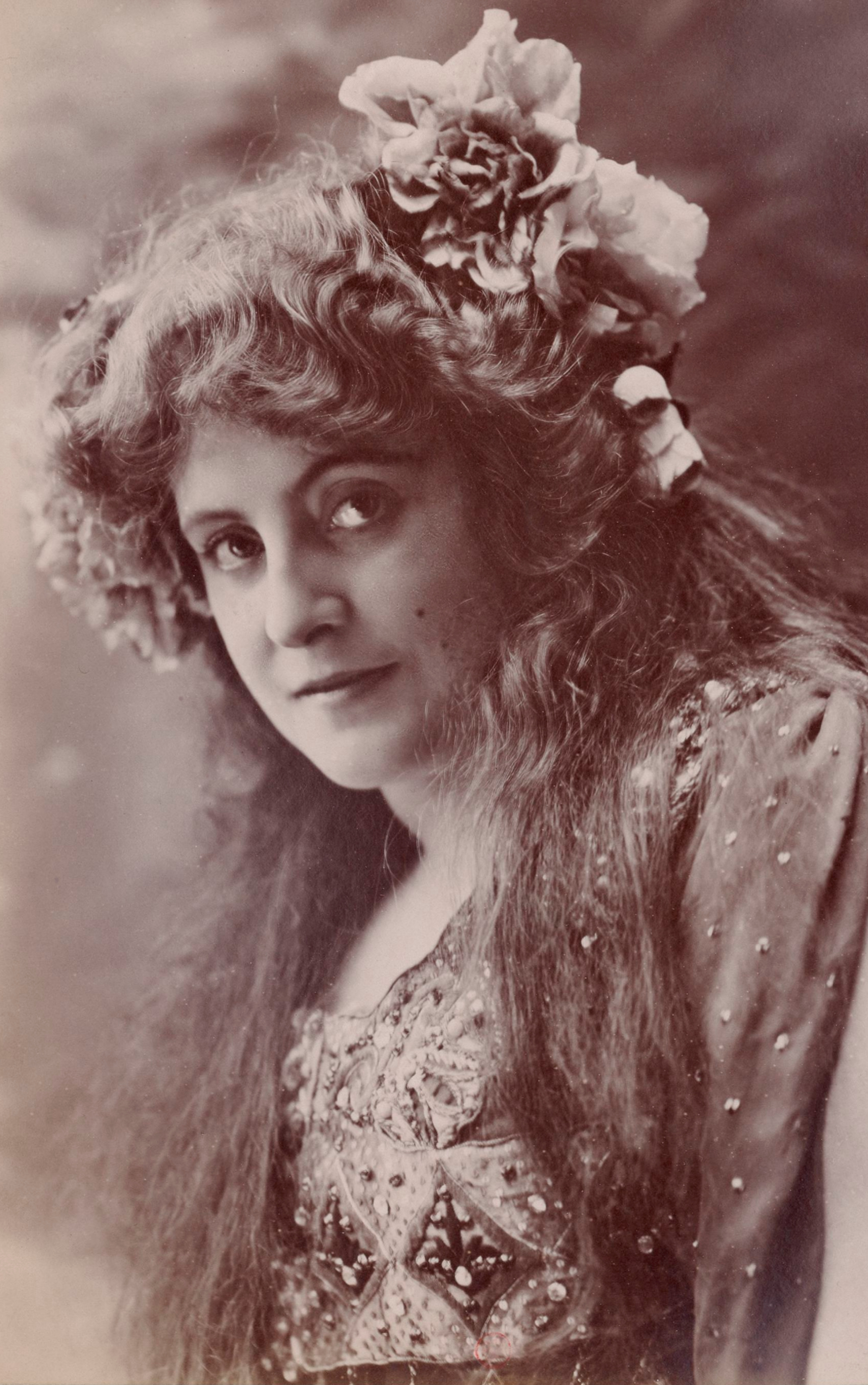
- Jane Margyl as Dalila, Paris Opera, 1905
- Born: Jeanne Clémence Floriet; 17 July 1874; Paris, France
- Died: 12 August 1907 (aged 33); Deauville, France
- Occupation: Operatic mezzo-soprano
- Organizations: Folies Bergère; Opéra-Comique; Paris Opera

Jeanne Clémence Floriet (de Margileray) called Jane Margyl (17 July 1874 – 12 August 1907) was a French mezzo-soprano. She began her career as a mime artist at the Folies Bergère starring in several productions. After voice studies, she appeared in operas from 1902 onwards. She first appeared at the Paris Opera in 1905 as Dalila in Samson et Dalila by Saint-Saëns, and took other leading roles there.

== Life ==
Born Jeanne Clémence Floriet in Paris, Margyl made her debut as a mime artist at the Folies Bergère on 10 February 1897, creating the title role in Phryné, a ballet-pantomime by Auguste Germain, with music by Louis Ganne. (Note: Phryné had been performed in Royan in the summer of 1896 by Cléo de Mérode.) Critics praised Margyl's talent as well as her beauty, and she played Phryné more than 200 times. In September 1898, she took part there in L'Enlèvement des Sabines, a ballet-pantomime by Adrien Vély and Charles Dutreil, with music by Paul Marcelles, with Odette Valery, J. Litini and J. Ducastel. On 25 January 1899, she also created the role of Princess Illys in La Princesse au sabbat, a ballet-pantomime by Jean Lorrain, with music by Louis Ganne, alongside Jane Thylda and Odette Valery. In Poussières de Paris, Lorrain described Margyl trying on her princess costume at the couturier Landolff.

She then undertook voice studies with Jules Chevallier and followed the advice of Alexandre Luigini. She made her debut at the Opéra-Comique on 15 November 1902 as Lola in Mascagni's Cavalleria rusticana, opposite Emma Calvé as Santuzza. In December 1902, she appeared in the small role of Princess Olympe in the world premiere of Reynaldo Hahn's La Carmélite. She resumed her voice studies, and in December 1903, Alexandre Luigini called her to replace Lina Pacary in the title role of Massenet's Hérodiade at the Théâtre de la Gaîté.

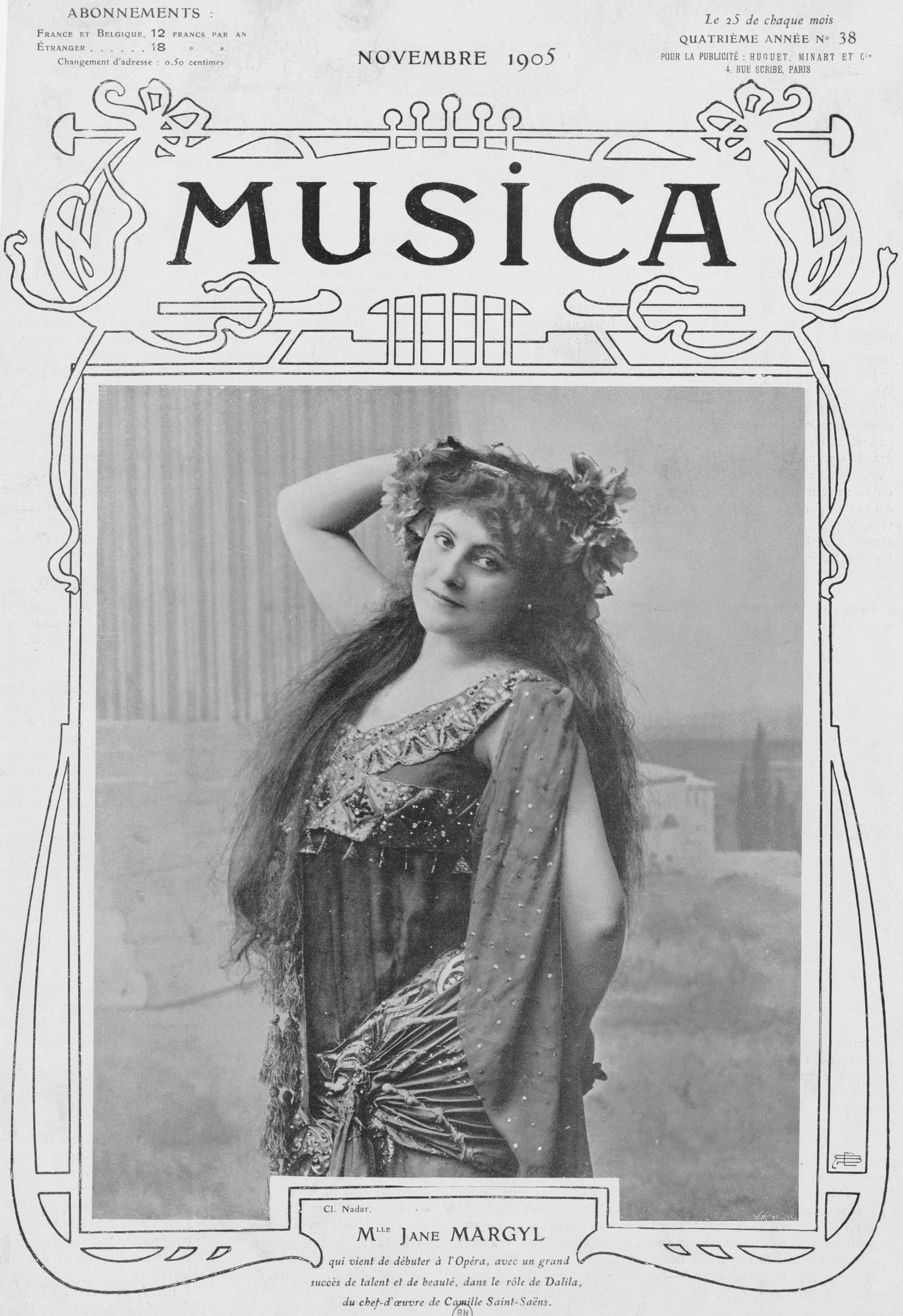
Flyer showing Margyl as Dalila

Engaged at the Paris Opera on 22 December 1904, she first performed there on 22 September 1905 as Dalila in Samson et Dalila by Saint-Saëns and achieved great success. She then appeared there on 16 February 1906 as Amneris in Verdi's Aida. On 17 December 1906, she appeared as Fricka in Wagner's Die Walküre.

In the meantime, on 24 April 1906, she took part in creating Le Clown, a musical novel by Victor Capoul, with music by Isaac de Camondo, alongside Geraldine Farrar, Marguerite Mérentié, Rousselière, Renaud and Delmas.

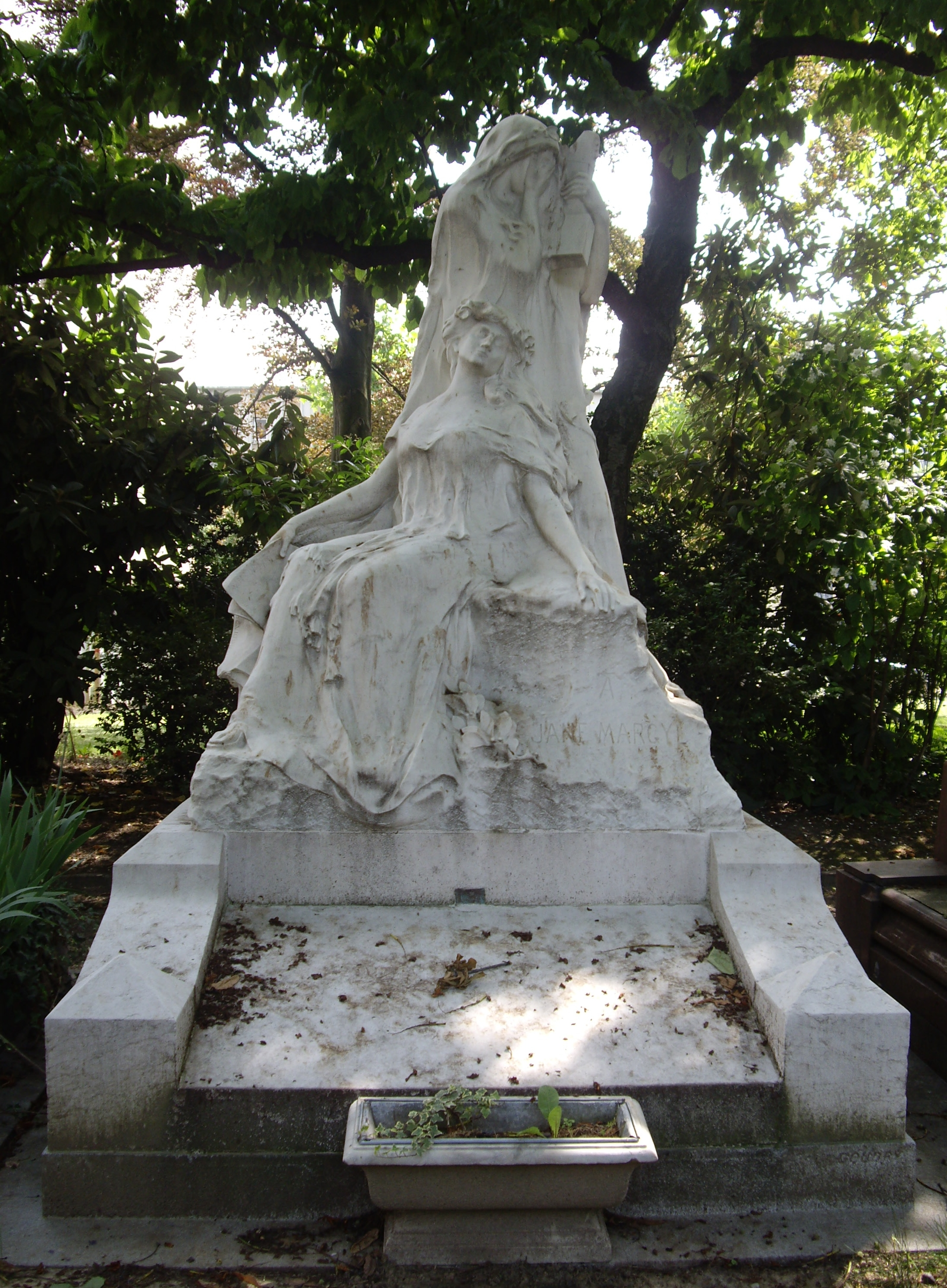
Margyl's grave stone at Batignolles Cemetery

She died in Deauville from appendicitis at the age of 33, while she was preparing for the roles of Fidès in Meyerbeer's Le prophète, Ann Boleyn in Henry VIII and Ortrud in Wagner's Lohengrin. She was buried in Paris at the Batignolles Cemetery (1st division), where a statue by François-Léon Sicard memorializes her, seated and dying, with Euterpe, the classical muse of music, hiding her lyre and her face.

== Family ==
Jane Margyl was the sister of:

- Marthe Floriet (1873–1965), a one-time eccentric comedian known as Miss Floresky.
- Georgette Floriet (1881–1912), wife of Edouard Guillaumet, a publicist and son of the painter Gustave Guillaumet; known in the theatre as Georgette Sandri.
- Blanche Floriet, who became duchess Melzi d'Eril di Lodi (1879–1961), mother of the photographer Georgette Chadourne (1899–1983).
- George Floriet.
