= Rossel =

Rossel may refer to:

== People ==
- Eduard Rossel (born 1937), Russian politician in Sverdlovsk oblast
- Élisabeth-Paul-Édouard de Rossel (1765–1829), French naval officer, explorer and hydrographer
- Louis Rossel (1844–1871), French army officer and Minister of War during the 1871 Paris Commune
- Marie-Thérèse Rossel (1910–1987), Belgian newspaper editor and businesswoman, proprietor of Rossel & Cie from 1935 to 1987
- Martin Rössel (born 1959), Swedish musician and producer
- Ricardo Rossel (1841–1909), Peruvian writer and poet.

== Places ==
- Rößel, the former German name for Reszel, a city in Poland
- Rossel (Elbe), a river in Germany
- Rossel Island (Yela), the easternmost island in the Louisiade Archipelago of Papua New Guinea

== Other ==
- Rossel & Cie, Belgian media group

== See also ==
- Roessel, a surname
