= Javotte =

Javotte may refer to:

- Javotte (ballet), an 1896 work without an opus number by Camille Saint-Saëns
- Javotte Bagatelle, a character in Bagatelle, an 1874 one-act French opéra-comique by Jacques Offenbach
- Javotte Lemoine, a role by Brigitte Bardot in 1952 film Crazy for Love
- a character in Manon, an opéra comique by Jules Massenet
- a character (Erminie's maid) in Erminie, a comic opera in two acts composed by Edward Jakobowski
- a character (market woman) in La fille de Madame Angot, an opéra comique in three acts by Charles Lecocq
