= Franz Ferenczy =

German opera singer (1835–1881)

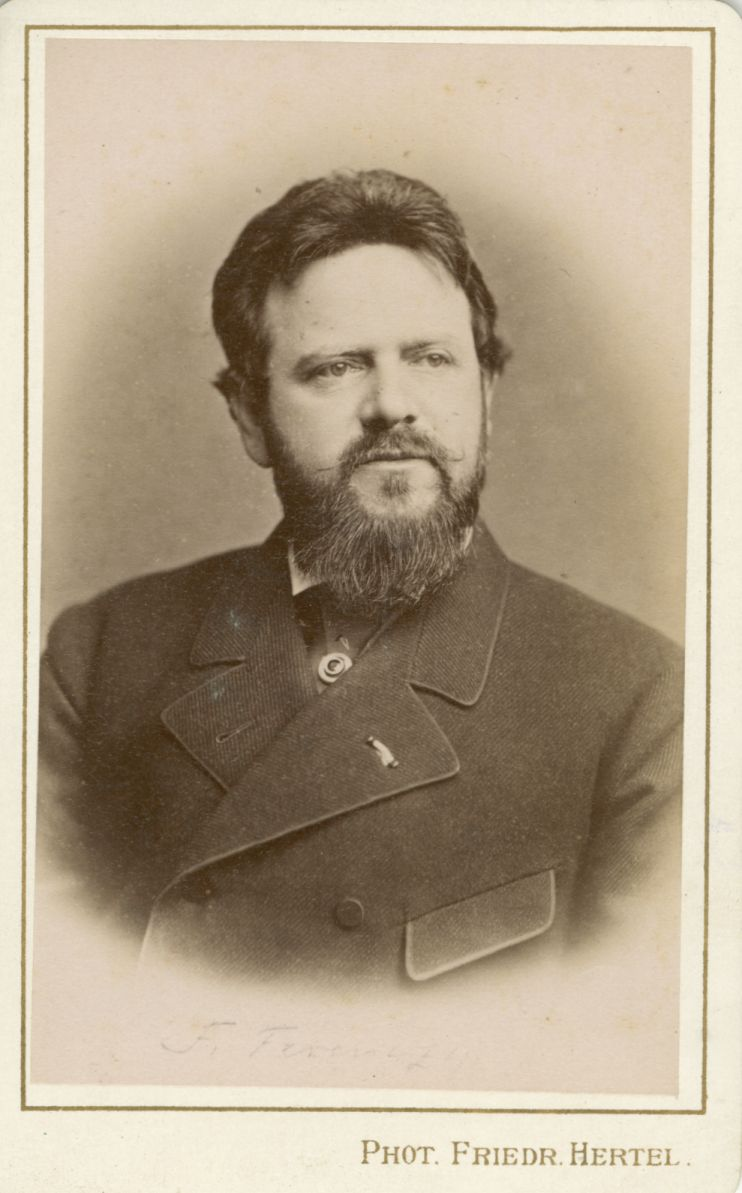
Portrait of Franz Ferenczy from the Archives of Bergen Public Library

Franz Ferenczy (also Franz Friedemann) (1835 – 27 February 1881, Weimar) was a nineteenth-century German tenor who had a prolific opera career in Europe between 1859 and 1880. Possessing a powerful voice with a wide vocal range, Ferenczy particularly excelled in the operas of Giacomo Meyerbeer and Richard Wagner. He is best remembered today for originating the role of Samson in the world premiere of Camille Saint-Saëns's Samson et Dalila in 1877. His brother, José Ferenczy (1852–1908), was also a successful operatic tenor.

== Biography ==
Born Franz Friedemann, Ferenczy studied singing at the Milan Conservatory under renowned teacher Francesco Lamperti from 1853 to 1854. He continued to study further in Vienna from 1855 to 1858 before making his professional opera debut in 1859 under the name Franz Ferenczy as Manrico in Verdi's Il trovatore at the opera house in Graz. He appeared in several smaller regional houses for the next three years and then joined the Berlin State Opera in 1862. While in Berlin he became acquainted with lauded opera composer Giacomo Meyerbeer who became a fan of his singing.

In 1863, Ferenczy made an extensive tour throughout Germany, Russia, and England appearing at most of those countries major opera houses, including the Royal Opera House, Covent Garden in London, the Hamburg State Opera in Germany, and the Bolshoi Theatre in Moscow among many others. He joined the Vienna State Opera in 1864 where he sang leading tenor roles through 1868. Between 1868 and 1871 he appeared in numerous operas throughout Europe, including performances in Milan, Barcelona, London, Hamburg, Berlin, and Karlsruhe.

In 1871, Ferenczy joined the roster at the Grossherzogliches Theater (now the Staatskapelle Weimar) making his debut as Lyonel in Flotow's Martha. He continued to sing roles with that opera company up through the winter of 1880, only a few months before his death in 1881. He most notably portrayed the role of Samson in the world premiere of Camille Saint-Saëns's Samson et Dalila on 2 December 1877 under the direction of Eduard Lassen. He also toured frequently with the company for opera performances in Sweden and Norway.

== Repertoire ==
Ferenczy spent much of his career singing French grand opera and German Romantic opera, particularly in operas by Meyerbeer and Richard Wagner, although his repertoire also encompassed a handful of bel canto roles and Verdi roles. Among the many Meyerbeer roles he portrayed are both Jean de Leyde and Jonas in Le prophète, Raoul de Nangis in Les Huguenots, and Vasco da Gama in L'Africaine among others. His Wagner roles included Loge in Das Rheingold, the title role in Lohengrin, Siegmund in Die Walküre, and the title role in Tannhäuser. Ferenczy was also admired for his performances of Adolar in Carl Maria von Weber's Euryanthe, Arnoldo in Rossini's William Tell, Eleazar in Fromental Halévy's La Juive, and Manrico in Verdi's Il Trovatore.
