= Auguste von Müller =

German opera singer

Auguste von Müller (1848–1912) was a nineteenth-century German operatic mezzo-soprano and actress. She is best remembered today for originating the role of Dalila in the world premiere of Camille Saint-Saëns's Samson et Dalila in 1877.

== Biography ==
Müller was born in Darmstadt, the daughter of German actress Maria von Müller-Stack who worked for many years at the Hoftheater von Darmstadt. She started her career appearing in plays at the Stadttheater von Stettin from 1875 to 1876. She began her opera career singing at the opera house in Riga in 1876–1877. She joined the Staatskapelle Weimar in 1877 and sang roles there through 1881. While there she notably portrayed the role of Dalila in the world premiere of Camille Saint-Saëns's Samson et Dalila on 2 December 1877 under the direction of Eduard Lassen. Her other roles in Weimar included Azucena in Giuseppe Verdi's Il trovatore, Frau Reich in Carl Otto Nicolai's The Merry Wives of Windsor, Fricka in both Richard Wagner's Das Rheingold and Die Walküre, and Floßhilde in Wagner's Götterdämmerung among others.

After leaving Weimar in 1881, Müller joined the Stadttheater von Bremen where she sang for only one season. She then sang at the Stadttheater von Magdeburg from 1882 to 1883, the Hoftheater von Altenburg from 1883 to 1884, the Hoftheater von Sondershausen from 1884 to 1885, and the Stadttheater von Lübeck from 1885 to 1886. She retired from the opera stage after leaving Lübeck and lived for a number of years in Bremen. She later moved back to her hometown of Darmstadt where she died.
