= Roessel =

Roessel is a surname. Notable people with the surname include:

- Charles M. Roessel (1961–2025), Navajo (Diné) photographer, journalist, academic administrator
- Eduard van Roessel (1897–1976), Dutch footballer
- Fritz Roessel (born 1937), Dutch chess player
- Jan van Roessel (1925–2011), Dutch footballer
- Pauline van Roessel (born 1967), Canadian rower

== See also ==
- Agda Rössel (1910–2001), Swedish politician and diplomat
- Martin Rössel (born 1959), Swedish musician and producer
- Reszel, a town in northeastern Poland, former German name Rößel
