= Georgette Chadourne =

French woman photographer

Georgette Chadourne, née Georgette Juliette Louise Floriet, (18 April 1899 – 28 April 1983) was a French surrealist photographer.

== Life ==
Born in the 17th arrondissement of Paris, the daughter of Blanche Floriet and Siegismund Porgès (who recognized her in 1911), Chadourne is the niece of Jules Porgès, Jane Margyl and Georgette Sandry.

She married Jean Puiforcat in 1922, then the Dadaist Paul Chadourne in 1929. Thanks to her connections with the Surrealists, she was able to photograph the great artists Matisse, Helleu (who would make a pastel of her cousin Blanche Floriet), Picasso, Christian Bérard., Nicolas de Staël.

Chadourne died in Neuilly-sur-Seine at the age of 84.

Chadourne had one daughter, Claude Blanche Puiforcat (6 March 1924 - ), who moved to the United States in 1946.

== Bibliography ==
In 1948, the Plon publishing house published Les Célibataires by Montherlant illustrated with 12 photographs by Chadourne.
