= Odette Valery =

Italian dancer

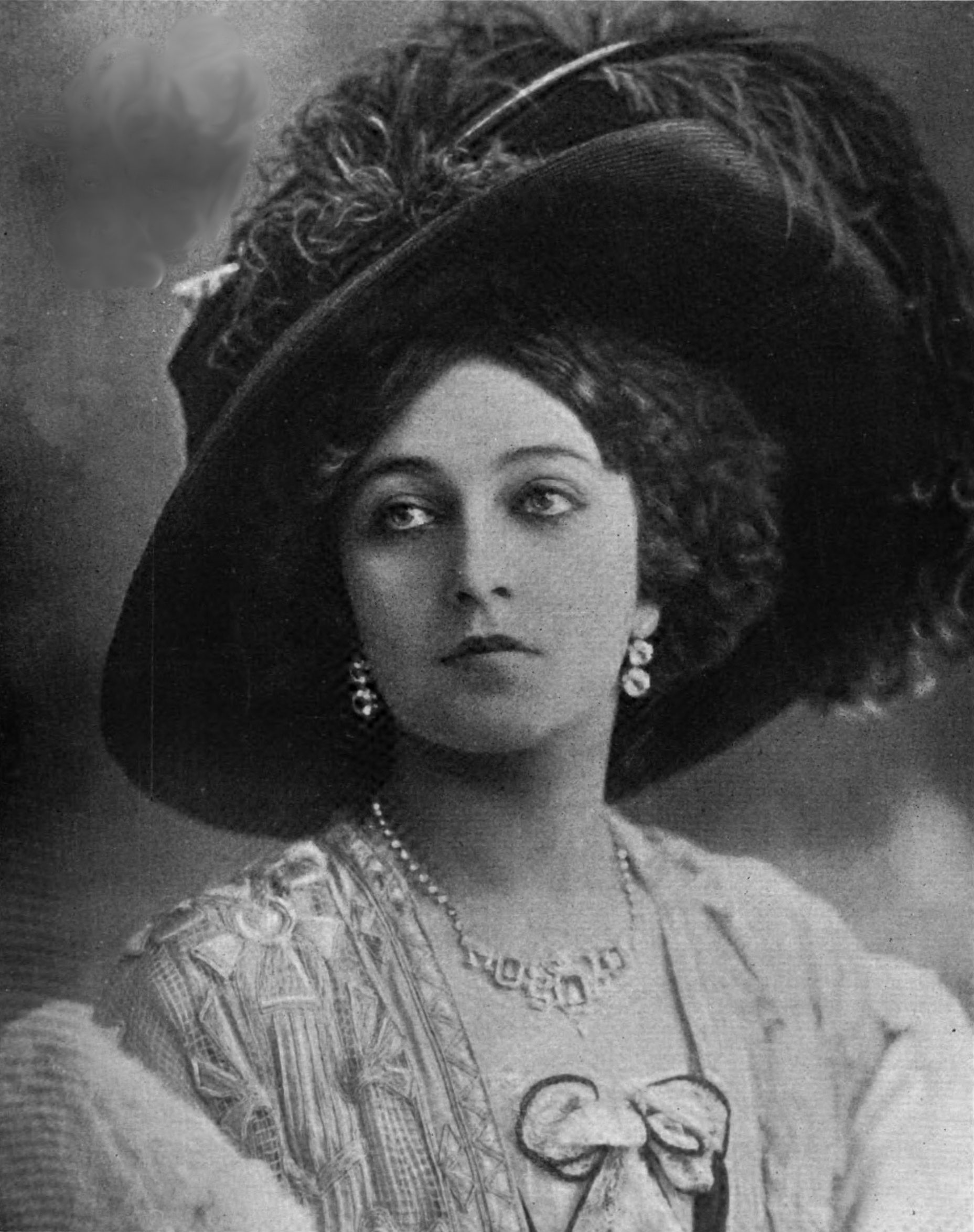
Odette Valery in 1908

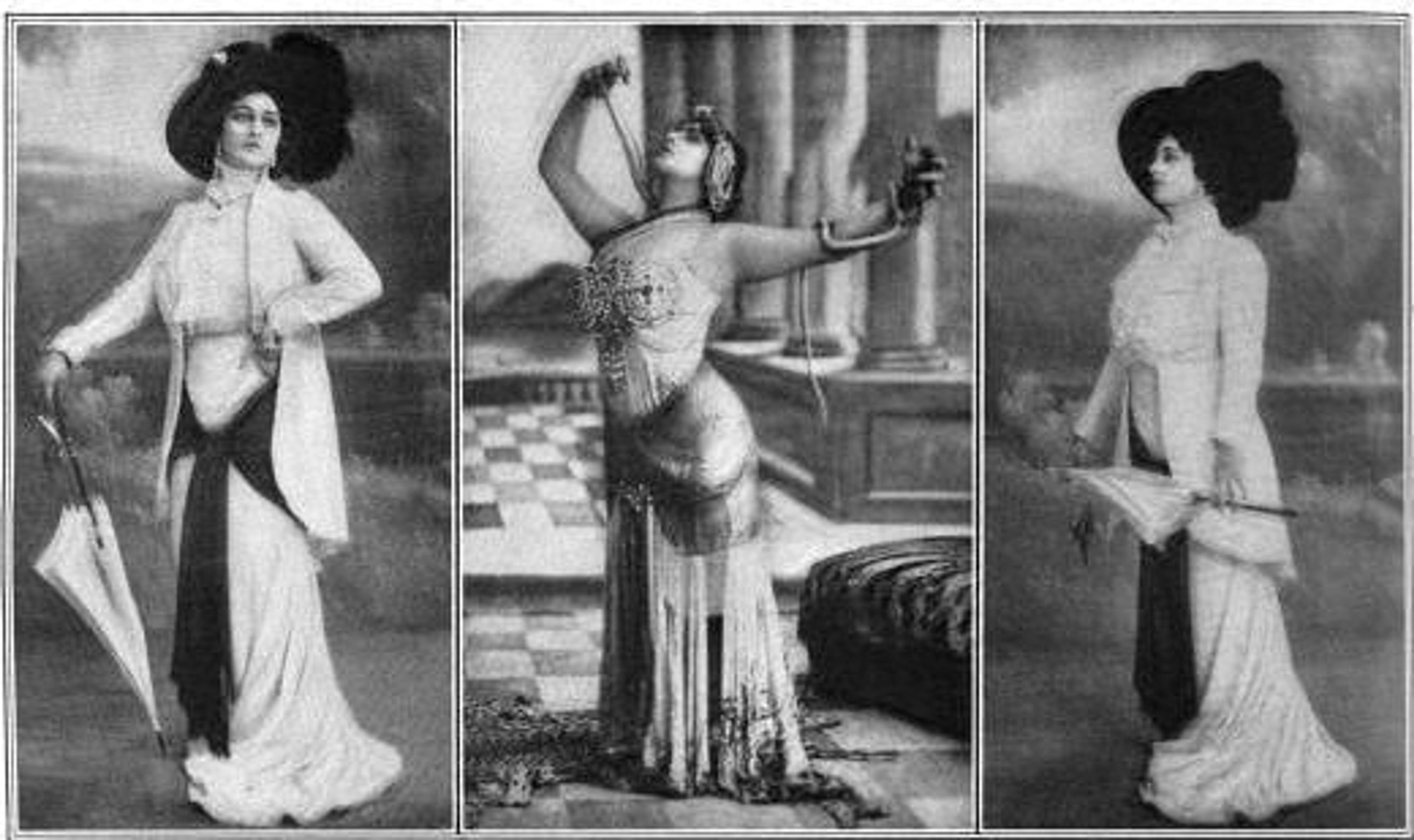
The centre photograph shows Valery as Cleopatra

Odette Valery (spelled Valéry in French publications), née Helene Vasilardi, (1883–?) was an Italian dancer of Greek parentage. She made her début at La Scala in 1898 at the age of fifteen. She moved to Paris where she danced with the Ballet Excelsior at the Folies Bergère.

She came to regard dancing en pointe as "old-fashioned" and made her name doing reconstructions of ancient Greek dances in bare feet. Later she portrayed Cleopatra and did an Egyptian dance with a live asp. She was well-educated and spoke French, German, Italian, Spanish and Russian as well as some English and she played the piano well.

In 1908, she caused a sensation in New York when she danced in the last act of Samson and Delilah at the Manhattan Opera House where she had been engaged by Oscar Hammerstein I. Her dance included the participation of one of three snakes (with fangs removed) which were cared for by their own groom, Robert, whom she had engaged in addition to other servants who traveled with her. In 1910 she was earning $1000 a week when dancing in the Teatro Comunale di Bologna. She owned several automobiles and amassed a fortune in jewellery. She spent lavishly and by 1912, she was destitute. Her money ran out when she had to have an operation and as a result she could not work for an extended period. Although her weekly salary was what a workman earned in a year at the time, she hadn't saved a penny.

She was found ill and starving in a cheap boarding house in Notting Hill, London where she was being cared for by her seven-year-old son, Gaeton. She had been surviving for a year by pawning her jewellery. She was found by a friend who was performing at Hammerstein's London Opera House. The friend took her in and was planning to send her back to her home in France to recover. She returned to Paris and although she was reputed to have had twenty-eight love affairs in one year at the height of her fame, she had few real friends and continued to live in poverty. It was a California heiress, Aimée Crocker, Mrs. Jackson Gouraud, who came to her aid on reading about her plight and gave a fund-raising ball in her honour at Martin's, New York. The hostess wore a live python around her neck for the event.
