= Adrien Vély =

French playwright and screenwriter

Anselme Adrien Raymond Lévy called Adrien Vély or Vély (3 September 1864 – 30 May 1935) was a French journalist and playwright. A Contest for a Handkerchief (1909), Le dîner du 9 (1909), and Un monsieur qui suit les dames (1906) are some of Adrien Vely's best-known works.

== Life ==
Born in the first arrondissement of Paris, a journalist, he wrote and performed his plays under the pseudonym of Vély. He also uses in the press the pseudonyms of Addé, Brioché and Plumquick. His plays were represented on the most important Parisian stages of the end of the 19th and the beginning of the 20th century. He also wrote songs, novels and film scripts.

== Work ==
As playwright

- 1887: Valentine crue Zoé, comédie-vaudeville en 1 acte, avec Adrien Moch, au théâtre des Menus-Plaisirs (13 April)
- 1892: La Petite Salammbô, parodie en 1 acte du roman de Gustave Flaubert, with Alévy, at Théâtre Déjazet (29 September)
- 1892: Cligne en haut ! Cligne en bas !, revue de fin d'année en 1 acte et 2 tableaux, avec Alévy, music by Charles Raiter, at Concert-Parisien (15 December)
- 1893: Veuve Prosper, successeur, opérette en 3 actes, avec Alévy, au Théâtre Déjazet (11 October)
- 1893: Paris-Printemps, revue, avec Alévy, au théâtre d'Application
- 1894: Napoléon intime, comédie en 1 acte, avec Alévy, au théâtre d'Amiens (9 juillet). Reprise au théâtre du Grand-Guignol in June 1897.
- 1894: Paris-Trianon, revue en 2 actes et 3 tableaux, with Alévy, at Trianon-Concert (31 July)
- 1894: Une Bonne soirée, opérette en 1 acte, with Alévy, music by Paul Marcelles, at Théâtre de l'Ambigu (21 December)
- 1895: Paris-Montmartre, revue en deux actes, un prologue et six tableaux, avec Alévy
- 1898: Paris qui trotte, revue à grand spectacle, with Alévy and Laurent Grillet, Nouveau-Cirque (8 February)
- 1898: Une lecture, ou les Jolies filles du Marché des Innocents, one act comedy, Théâtre des Capucines (20 October)
- 1900: Ya d'la femme, revue en deux actes et un tableau, with Victor de Cottens, music by Laurent Halet, at Concert Parisien (15 October)
- 1901: La revue des Variétés, three acts review, with Paul Gavault, at Théâtre des Variétés (11 December)
- 1901: Bichette, three acts vaudeville, with Alexandre Fontanes, at Théâtre du Palais-Royal (19 September)
- 1902: Les Aventures du capitaine Corcoran, play in 5 acts and 17 scenes based on the novel by Alfred Assollant, with Paul Gavault and Georges Berr, at Théâtre du Châtelet (30 October)
- 1902: V'là l'métro !, revue in two acts and ten scenes, with Henry de Gorsse, at la Cigale (7 November)
- 1902: Monsieur Tranquille, one act comedy, with Léon Miral, at Théâtre des Capucines (22 December)
- 1903: Qu'est-ce qu'on risque ?, revue in two acts and ten scenes, with Charles Clairville, at la Cigale
- 1904: Pour trente-deux francs, one act play, with Léon Miral, at Théâtre des Capucines (21 April)
- 1905: Une revue au Théâtre du Palais Royal, review in ten scenes including a prologue, with Pierre Veber, at Théâtre du Palais-Royal (1 December)
- 1905: Le Numéro 33, one act play, with Léon Miral, at Théâtre des Capucines (24 January)
- 1906: English school, one act play, at Théâtre du Palais-Royal (4 May)
- 1906: Ohé ! La r'vue du Français, revue locale et féerique en 3 actes et 7 tableaux, au Théâtre-Français de Bordeaux (23 December)
- 1909: La Poire, pièce en 1 acte, with Léon Miral, at Théâtre des Capucines (25 April)
- 1914: Le 1er janvier de la sous-préfète, one act comedy
- 1916: Le Locataire est sans pitié, one act comedy, in verses
- 1920: La Poupée américaine, three acts operetta, with Victor de Cottens, Armand Lévy and Fernand Rouvray, Alcazar de Brussels (19 February)
- 1926: La Double gageure, unpublished comedy
- undated: Un directeur de naguère, at Théâtre Michel.

Novelist

- 1894: Contes panachés, éditions Calmann-Lévy
- 1902: L'Illustre Saint-Gratien, illustrations by Paul Destez, librairie Paul Ollendorf
- 1909: Les petites amies de M. St-Gratien, illustrations by Paul Destez, librairie Paul Ollendorf
- 1913: Saint-Gratien est dans nos murs !, illustrations by Paul Destez, librairie Paul Ollendorf
- 1914: M. Schnitz et M. Schnatz, foreword by Hansi, illustrations by Paul Destez, librairie Paul Ollendorf
- 1924: En voilà des histoires, éditions Ferenczi
- 1924: La Plus aimée, éditions Albin Michel
- 1924: Mlle Charlequine, poule, éditions Flammarion

Journalist

- 1894: La Galerie des chefs-d’œuvre
- 1921: La Grande détresse de la poésie française
- 1929: Le Prix de français en Alsace, 6th year, 1929.

Screenwriter

- 1908: Un monsieur qui suit les dames, short film (250 m) by Georges Monca
- 1909: Le Dîner du 9, short film (215 m) by an anonymous director
- 1909: La Course au mouchoir, short film by an anonymous director
- 1910: Amis de table d'hôte, short film by an anonymous director
- 1911: Pour voir Paris, short film by Albert Capellani
- 1912: Zoé a le cœur trop tendre, short film (155 m) by an anonymous director.

== Awards ==
- Chevalier de la Légion d'Honneur
- Officier d'Académie (ministerial order of 19 November 1889)
- Ordre des Palmes académiques (ministerial order of 17 January 1897)
