= Lars Cleveman =

Swedish musician and opera singer

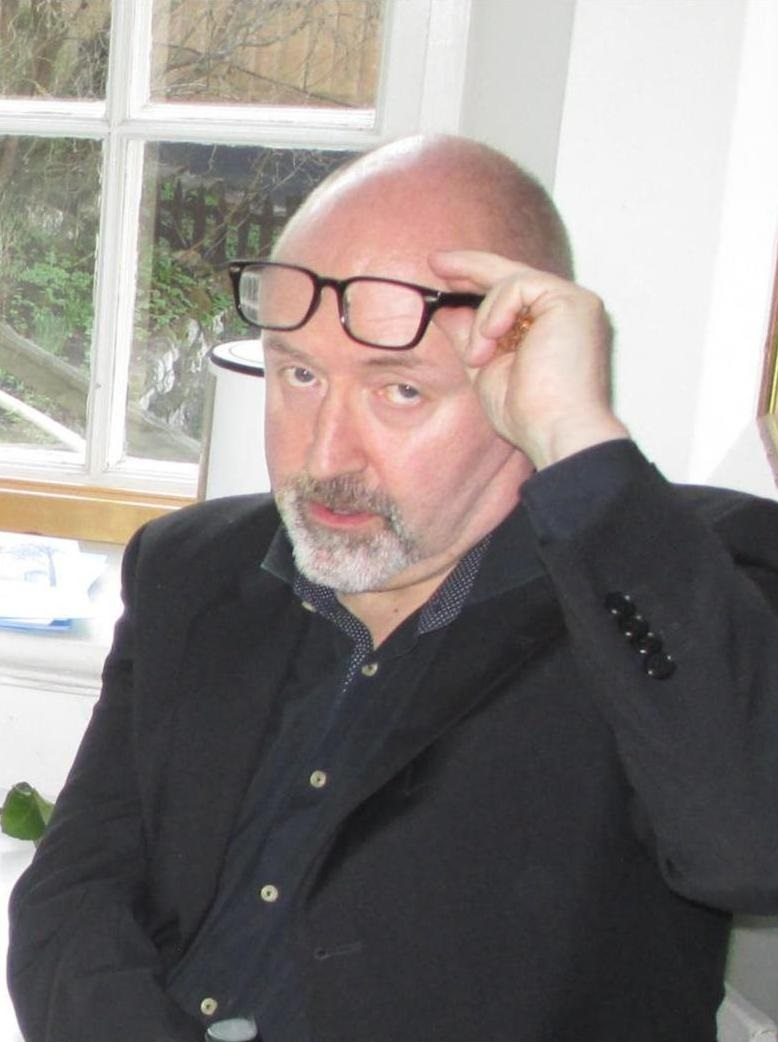
Cleveman in 2016

Lars Cleveman (born 16 June 1958) is a Swedish musician and opera singer.

== Career ==
Together with Martin Rössel, Cleveman founded Sweden's first electronic underground group, Dom Dummaste. Additionally, Cleveman is a tenor opera singer, performing at the Royal Swedish Opera in Stockholm. He made his début at Covent Garden in 2009 as Tristan in Tristan und Isolde replacing an indisposed Ben Heppner and subsequently also sang at Bayreuther Festspiele during 2011. In May 2013, Cleveman made his début at the Metropolitan Opera singing the role of Siegfried in the third of three performances of Wagner's Ring Cycle.

== Recordings ==
=== With Dom Dummaste ===
==== Albums ====
- Lars Cleveman, Martin Rössel & Dom Dummaste, Sista Bussen, 1980.
- Sympati För Djävulen, MNWP 122, 1982.
- Revolverkäke, DD Records, 1983.
- Live Teater Schahrazad 25 November 1983, Not On Label, 1984
- 4 Känsler, Criminal Records, 1992.
- The Backward Tapes, Sista Bussen, 1993
- Patrik, Criminal Records, 1997
- Fluffprestige 2000, Criminal Records, 2000
- Dom Dummaste, Launch Records, 2011

==== Singles & EPs ====
- Julsingel -81, Sista Bussen, 1981
- Huset E Fullt Me Syra, CBS, 1990

==== Compilations ====
- Var är ni nu Dom Dummaste?, Erik Axl Sund, 2018

=== With Cleveman Rössel ===
- Prayer Of Love. CD. The Label 2005.
- Memento, LP. Not an Label. 2012.

=== Solo ===
- The Ghost, single, DD-Records 1984.
- Cleveman, LP, DD-Records 1985.
- 100 Wars of Jesus Christ, single, Eternal Love 1986.
- Première!. Songs and arias. Malena Karlsson, piano. Anders Dahls ensemble. Proprius PRCD9155. 1996. CD.
- Verdi: Don Carlos (titelroll). Chorus and Orchestra of the Royal Swedish Opera. Dirigent Alberto Hold-Garrido. 3 CD. Naxos 8.660096-98, 3 cd 1996.
- Mannen som begav sig. CD. Criminal Records 2002.
- Beethoven: Symfoni nr 9 (tenorpartiet), CD. Simax Classics 2009.
- Voices in My Head, CD. Polythene Records. 2009.
- Wagner: Ragnarök (Siegfried). Hallé Orchestra under ledning av Sir Mark Elder. 5 CD. Hallé CD HLD7525. 2010.
- Under The Influence, LP/CD, Outbox Music 2014.
- Wagner: Parsifal. Hallé Orchestra under ledning av Sir Mark Elder. 4 CD. Hallé CD HLD7539. 2017.

== Opera Roles (highlights) ==
- Don José in Carmen
- Hertigen Duca in Rigoletto
- lead in Werther
- Hoffman in Hoffmanns äventyr
- lead in Don Carlos
- Grigorij in Boris Godunov
- Manrico in Trubaduren
- Pinkerton in Madama Butterfly
- Des Grieux in Manon Lescaut
- lead in Othello
- Cavaradossi in Tosca
- lead in Parsifal
- Tristan in Tristan och Isolde
- lead in Siegfried
- Siegfried in Ragnarök
- Siegmund in Die Walküre
- lead in Tannhäuser
- lead in Stiffelio
- Riccardo/Gustavo in Maskeradbalen
- Eleazar in La Juive av Fromental Halevy
