= Alfred Assollant =

French journalist and writer

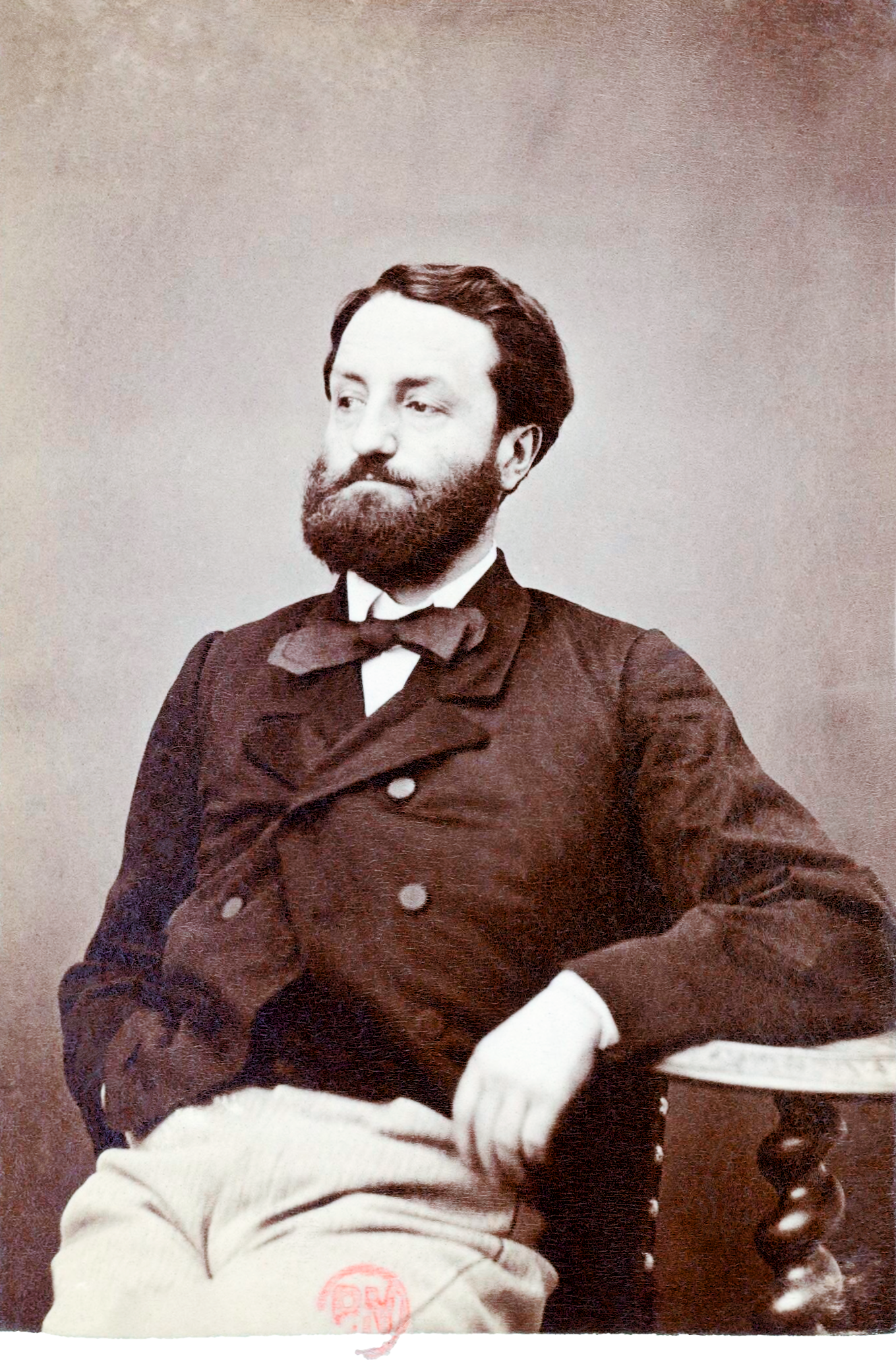
- Portrait of Alfred Assollant by Nadar
- Born: Jean-Baptiste-Alfred Assollant; 20 March 1828; Aubusson, Creuse, France
- Died: 3 March 1886 (aged 58); Paris, France
- Occupations: Novelist, journalist, politician

Jean-Baptiste-Alfred Assollant (20 March 1827 – 3 March 1886) was a French writer, journalist and activist.

== Biography ==
After graduating from École Normale, he began his career by teaching in Paris and in a few other cities. A staunch Republican, Assollant became involved in journalism by writing polemical articles against the reign of Louis-Philippe. Seeking to secure a freer existence in North America, he traveled for two years around the United States and Canada. He returned to Paris in 1858 and then in 1858 published Scènes de la vie des États-Unis, which he followed with novels and short stories based on his travels in North America. A fierce opponent of Napoleon III, Assollant returned to journalism by contributing to the opposition press.

Having become an author of novels for young people, he published, in 1867, The Marvelous Adventures of Captain Corcoran. This novel, as well as The Story of Pierrot were popular books among young adults at the time.

In 1869, he was a candidate in the legislative elections in the fifth constituency of Paris but obtained a small number of votes. In the 1871 elections, he canvassed the voters of Creuse, with no more success than in Paris. After the Franco-Prussian War, he devoted himself to political writing and became especially linked to the organs close to the supporters of the Paris Commune.

Under the influence of political defeats and personal sorrows, Assollant spent the last years of his life living in a small hotel. After his death, Assollant was first buried in the cemetery of Saint-Ouen but his grave was relocated to Père-Lachaise since 1890.

== Selected works ==
- Scènes de la vie des États-Unis, Acacia, les butterfly, une fantasie américaine, Paris 1859
- Brancas, Paris 1859
- Deux amis en 1792, Paris 1859 (dt. Zwei Freunde im Jahre 1792, 1863)
- Histoire fantastique du célèbre Pierrot écrite par le magicien Alcofribas, 1860
- Les aventures de Karl Brunner, Paris 1860
- Marcomir, histoire d'un étudiant: Roman, Paris 1862.
- Aventures merveilleuses mais authentiques du capitaine Corcoran, Paris 1867 (en. The Marvelous Adventures of Captain Corcoran)
- François Bûchamor: récits de la vieille France, Paris 1872
- Rachel, histoire joyeuse, Paris 1874
- La croix des prêches, Paris 1877
- Pendragon, Paris 1881
