= Samson and Delilah (opera) =

Opera by Camille Saint-Saëns and Ferdinand Lemaire

Samson et Dalila
- Grand opera by Camille Saint-Saëns
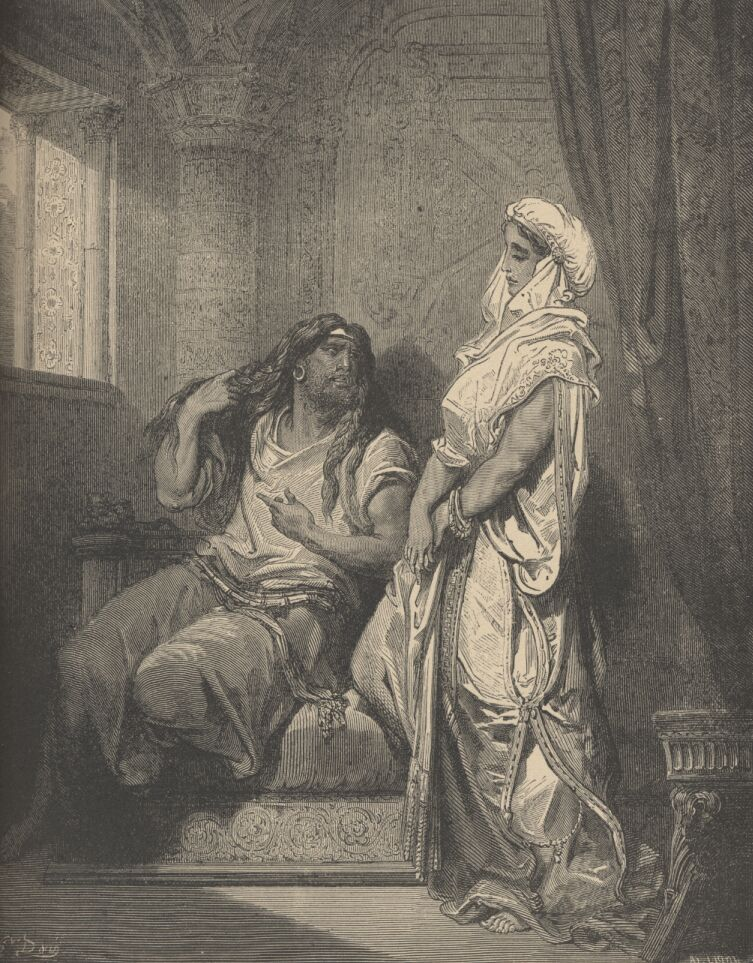
- Samson and Delilah, by Gustave Doré, c. 1860
- Librettist: Ferdinand Lemaire
- Language: French
- Based on: Samson and Delilah
- Premiere: 2 December 1877; Ducal Theatre, Weimar

Samson and Delilah (French: Samson et Dalila), Op. 47, is a grand opera in three acts and four scenes by Camille Saint-Saëns to a French libretto by Ferdinand Lemaire. It was first performed in Weimar at the Grossherzogliches (Grand Ducal) Theater (now the Staatskapelle Weimar) on 2 December 1877 in a German translation.

The opera is based on the Biblical tale of Samson and Delilah found in Chapter 16 of the Book of Judges in the Old Testament. It is the only opera by Saint-Saëns that is regularly performed. The second act love scene in Delilah's tent is one of the set pieces that define French opera. Two of Delilah's arias are particularly well known: "Printemps qui commence" ("Spring begins") and "Mon cœur s'ouvre à ta voix" ("My heart opens itself to your voice", also known as "Softly awakes my heart"), the latter of which is one of the most popular recital pieces in the mezzo-soprano/contralto repertoire.

== Composition history ==
In the middle of the 19th century, a revival of interest in choral music swept France, and Saint-Saëns, an admirer of the oratorios of Handel and Mendelssohn, made plans to compose an oratorio on the subject of Samson and Delilah as suggested by Voltaire's libretto Samson for Rameau. The composer began work on the theme in 1867, just two years after completing his first (and as then yet unperformed) opera, Le timbre d'argent. Saint-Saëns had approached Ferdinand Lemaire, the husband of one of his wife's cousins, about writing a libretto for the oratorio but Lemaire convinced the composer that the story was better suited to an opera.

Saint-Saëns later wrote:

A young relative of mine had married a charming young man who wrote verse on the side. I realized that he was gifted and had in fact real talent. I asked him to work with me on an oratorio on a biblical subject. 'An oratorio!', he said, 'no, let's make it an opera!', and he began to dig through the Bible while I outlined the plan of the work, even sketching scenes, and leaving him only the versification to do. For some reason I began the music with act 2, and I played it at home to a select audience who could make nothing of it at all.

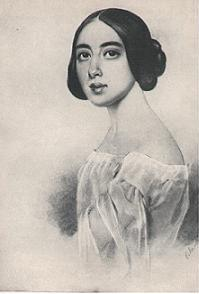
The role of Dalila was written for Pauline Viardot (1821–1910) (pictured) but the singer was too old to assay the role for the 2 December 1877 Weimar premiere and the role was entrusted to Auguste von Müller.

After Lemaire finished the libretto, Saint-Saëns began actively composing act 2 of the opera, producing an aria for Dalila, a duet for Samson and Dalila, and some musical pieces for the chorus (some of which were later assigned to act 1) during 1867–1869. From the very beginning, the work was conceived as a grand duet between Samson and Dalila set off against the approaching tempest. Although the orchestration was not yet complete, act 2 was presented in a private performance in 1870 just prior to the outbreak of the Franco-Prussian War with Saint-Saëns playing the orchestral parts, which were largely improvised, on the piano. Composer Augusta Holmès (Dalila), painter Henri Regnault (Samson), and Romain Bussine (High Priest) rendered their roles from part books. In spite of many precedents, the French public reacted negatively to Saint-Saëns's intention of putting a Biblical subject on the stage. The alarm on the part of the public caused him to abandon working further on the opera for the next two years.

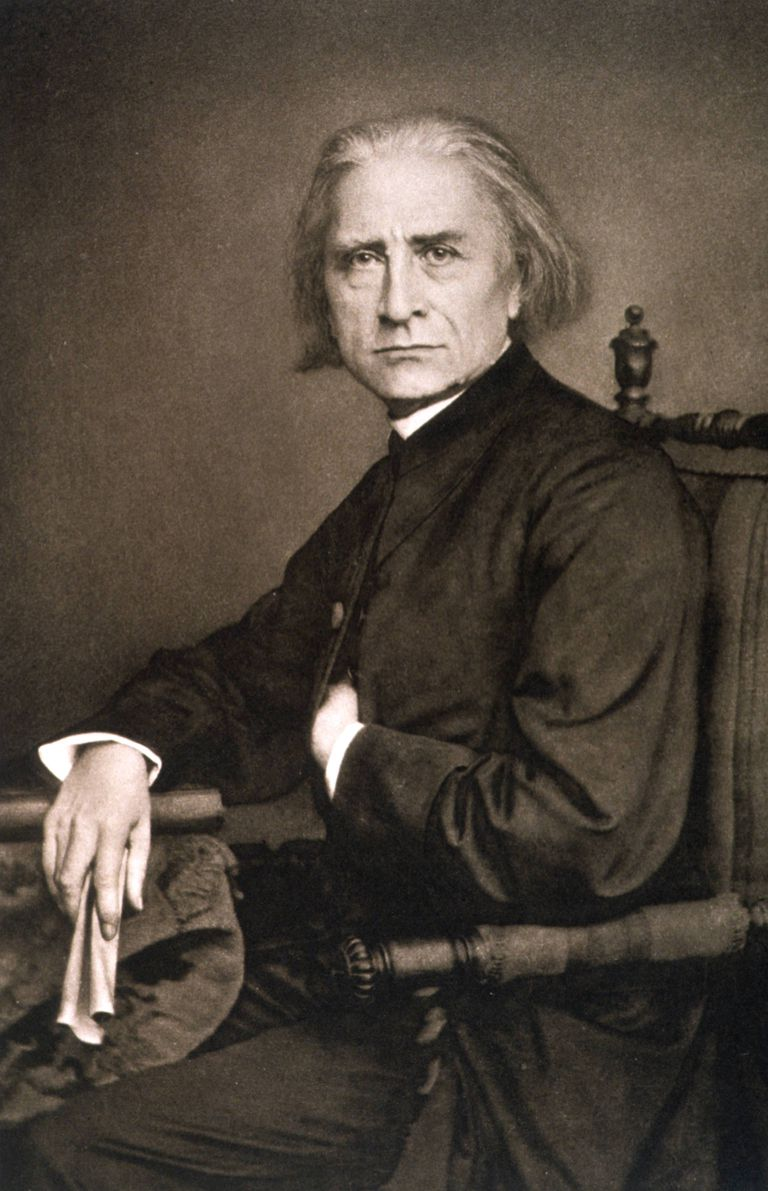
Franz Liszt (1811–1886) was an enthusiastic supporter of Samson et Dalila and was instrumental in arranging the first production in Weimar. (Photograph, 1870)

In the summer of 1872, not too long after the premiere of Saint-Saëns's second opera La princesse jaune, the composer went to Weimar to see the first revival of Wagner's Das Rheingold under the baton of Franz Liszt, the former musical director of the Weimar court orchestra and opera. Liszt was highly interested in producing new works by talented composers and persuaded Saint-Saëns to finish Samson and Delilah, even offering to produce the completed work at the grand-ducal opera house in Weimar. Encouraged, Saint-Saëns began composing act 1 in late 1872 and worked on it sporadically for the next few years. He wrote a large amount of act 1 and completed it during a trip to Algiers in 1874. Upon returning to France in 1875, Saint-Saëns presented act 1 in Paris at the Théâtre du Châtelet in a similar format as the 1870 performance of act 2. The work was harshly received by music critics and failed to gain the public's interest. That year acclaimed mezzo-soprano Pauline Viardot, for whom Saint-Saëns wrote the role of Dalila, organized and performed in a private performance of act 2 at a friend's home in Croissy, with the composer at the piano. Viardot was a great admirer of the work and she hoped that this private performance would encourage Halanzier, the director of the Paris Opéra who was in attendance, to mount a full production. Although Saint-Saëns completed the score in 1876, no opera houses in France displayed any desire to stage Samson et Dalila. Liszt's sustained support however led to the work being mounted in Weimar in 1877.

== Performance history ==
=== Premiere in Weimar ===
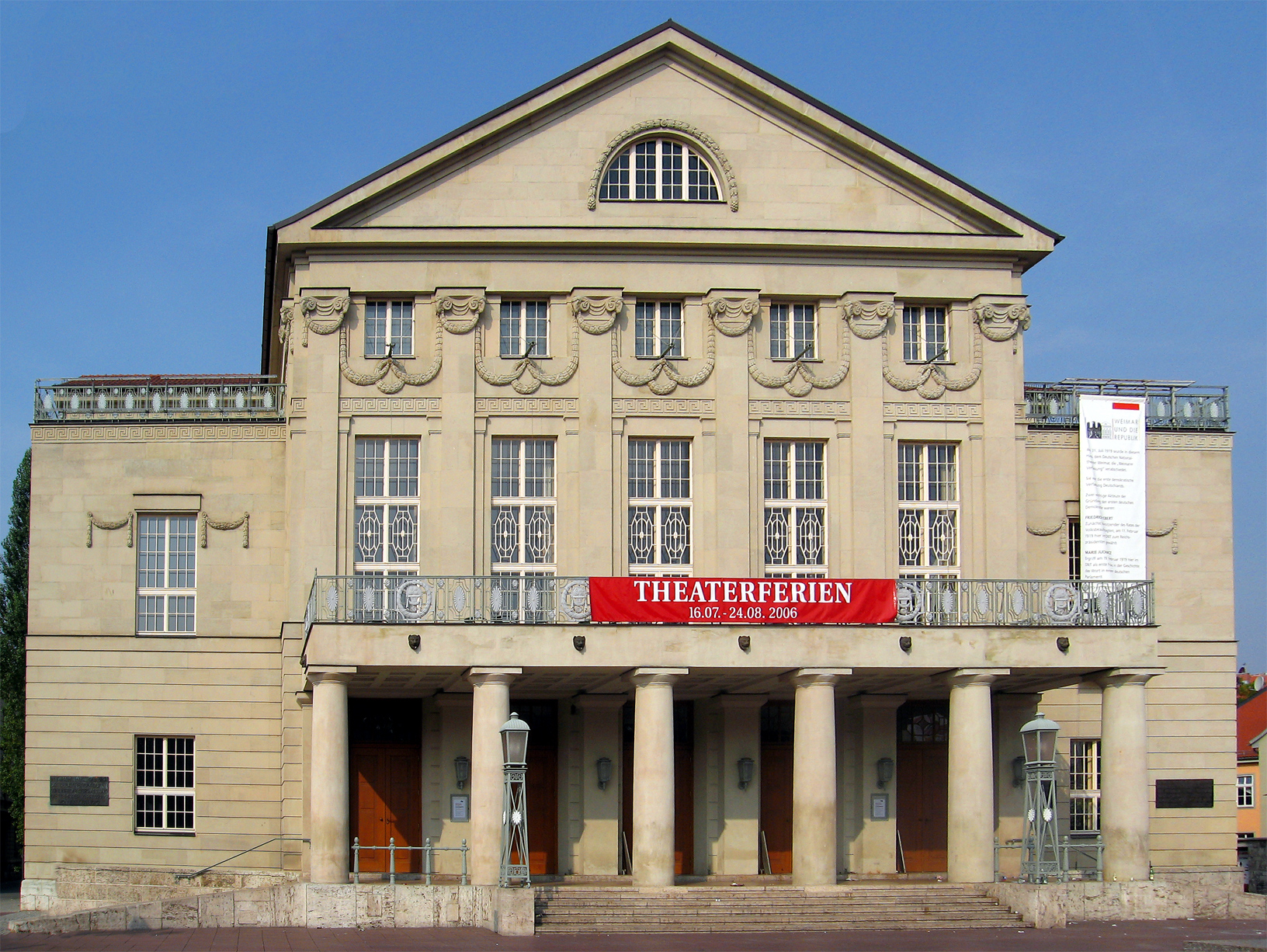
The Grand Ducal Theater in Weimar (now the Staatskapelle Weimar) was the site of the premiere of the complete Samson et Dalila on 2 December 1877.

Although Liszt was no longer the musical director in Weimar, he still exerted a powerful influence at the Weimar court. Eduard Lassen, the director who followed Liszt at Weimar, owed much of his success to his celebrated predecessor, and Liszt used his influence to arrange the premiere of Samson et Dalila with Lassen on the podium during the 1877/1878 season. The libretto was duly translated into German for the production and the opera's first performance was given on 2 December 1877 at the Grossherzogliches Theatre (Grand Ducal Theater). Viardot was too old to sing Delilah so the role was entrusted to Auguste von Müller, a resident performer at the Weimar opera house. Although a resounding success with the Weimar critics and audience, the opera was not immediately revived in other opera houses.

=== Beginning of international popularity in the 1890s ===
After the numerous setbacks it suffered in its early years, Samson et Dalila finally began to attract the attention of the world's great opera houses during the 1890s. Although the next new production of Samson et Dalila was in Germany at the Hamburg State Opera in 1882, afterwards the opera was not seen again until it was performed for the first time in France at the Théâtre des Arts in Rouen on 3 March 1890 with Carlotta Bossi as Dalila and Jean-Alexandre Talazac as Samson. The opera received its Paris premiere at the Éden-Théâtre on 31 October 1890 with Rosine Bloch as Dalila and Talazac singing Samson once again, this time with a much warmer reception by Paris audiences. Over the next two years, performances were given in Bordeaux, Geneva, Toulouse, Nantes, Dijon, and Montpellier. The Paris Opéra finally staged the opera on 23 November 1892 in a performance under the supervision of Saint-Saëns conducted by Édouard Colonne with Blanche Deschamps-Jéhin as Dalila and Edmond Vergnet as Samson. Directed by Lapissida, the staging had costumes by Charles Bianchini and sets by Amable and Eugène Gardy (acts 1 and 2), and Eugène Carpezat (act 3). The performance was lauded by critics and spectators alike.

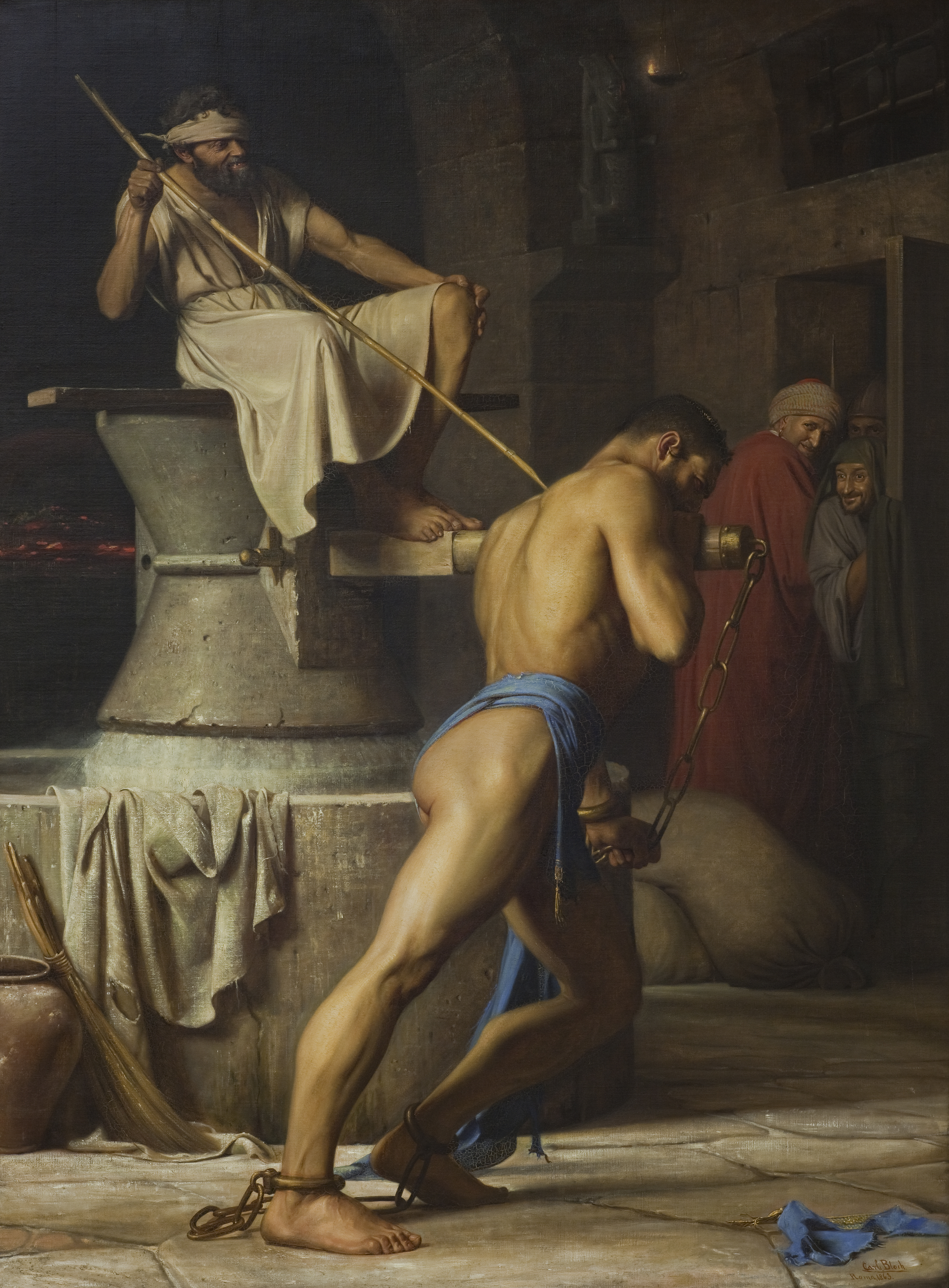
Samson at the Treadmill (Carl Bloch, 1834–1890)

Samson et Dalila also earned a great deal of popularity outside France during the 1890s. The opera debuted successfully in Monaco at the Opéra de Monte-Carlo on 15 March 1892. This was followed by the opera's United States premiere at Carnegie Hall in a concert version on 24 March 1892 by the Oratorio Society of New York, conducted by Walter Damrosch. The first staged performance of the opera in the U.S. was held at the French Opera House, New Orleans on 4 January 1893. The first of many productions at the Metropolitan Opera in New York City was held on 2 February 1895, with Eugenia Mantelli as Dalila, Francesco Tamagno as Samson, and Pol Plançon portraying both Abimélech and the Old Hebrew. There is some evidence that the sets for the Met's production had been taken from some of their other operas, and at the second performance that season the work was given in concert, with the ballet sequences omitted; in this form the work traveled to Boston, where it was performed on 3 March 1895.

The opera made its premiere in Italy at the Teatro Pagliano (Teatro Verdi (Florence)) on 26 March 1892. The opera was given in Venice at the Teatro La Fenice on 8 March 1893 with Elisa Persini as Dalila and Augusto Brogi as Samson. The work was first given at La Scala on 17 January 1895 with Renée Vidal as Dalila and Emanuele Lafarge as Samson. This was followed by its first performance at the Teatro Regio di Torino on 6 January 1897 with Alice Cucini and Irma De Spagni alternating as Dalila and Hector Dupeyron as Samson. The work was first performed at the Teatro Regio di Parma that same year and was mounted at the Teatro Comunale di Bologna in 1899.

In England, the opera was first performed on 25 September 1893 at the Royal Opera House, Covent Garden. Although the company planned on performing the work in a fully staged production, the Lord Chamberlain objected to a Biblical work being mounted and the company was forced to present the opera in a concert version. It was not staged in London until 1909 when the ban was finally lifted. Louise Kirkby Lunn portrayed Dalila and Charles Fontaine portrayed Samson in the 1909 production. Subsequently, Paul Franz replaced Fontaine in the protagonist's role, earning the composer's praise for both the quality of his voice and his interpretation.

=== 20th and 21st century performance history ===
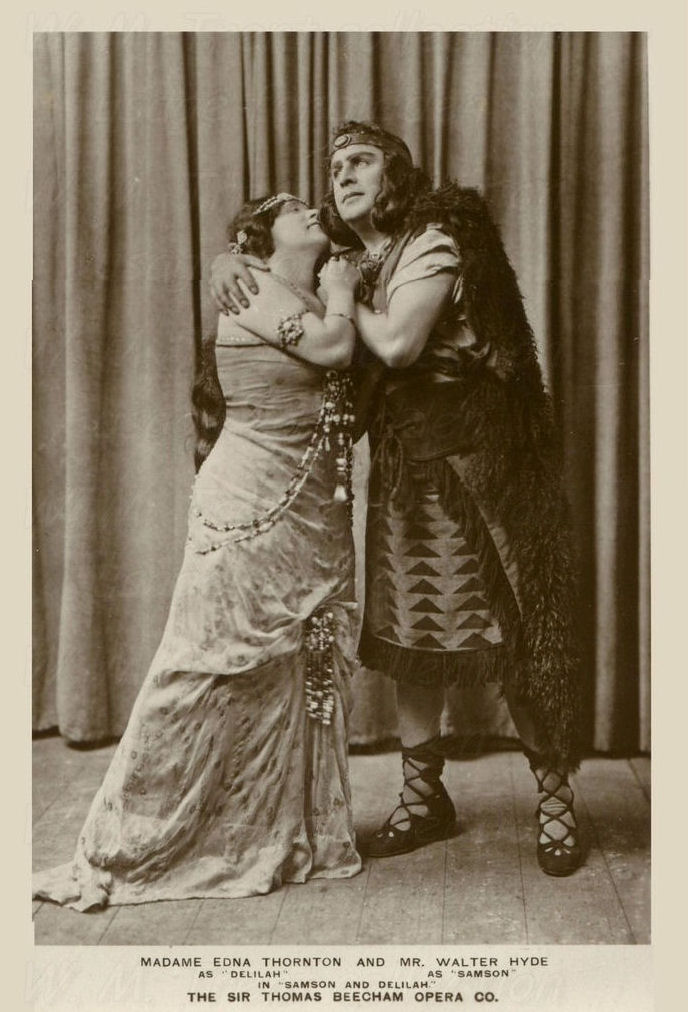
Walter Hyde and Edna Thornton in the 1919 London production of Samson and Delilah conducted by Sir Thomas Beecham

By 1906, Samson et Dalila had received more than 200 performances internationally. The opera has continued to remain moderately popular since and, while not being among the most frequently performed operas, the work has become a part of the standard opera performance repertory at most major opera houses. The opera has been revived numerous times not only in Europe and North America, but also in South America, Australia, and Asia. While none of Saint-Saëns's later operas suffered the tribulations endured by Samson et Dalila during its early years, none of his other works have achieved the same enduring success either.

In North America, French contralto Jeanne Gerville-Réache is largely credited for popularizing the work in the United States and Canada during the early twentieth century. Réache first performed the role of Delilah with the Manhattan Opera Company in New York City in 1908 and went on to sing the role several more times over the next seven years, including performances in Philadelphia, Boston, Chicago, and Montreal (for the Canadian premiere in 1915).

The Metropolitan Opera revived the opera in its 1915/1916 season with Margaret Matzenauer as Delilah, Enrico Caruso as Samson, and Pasquale Amato as the High Priest. Since then the company has staged productions of the opera at least once every decade giving more than 200 performances of the work. Plácido Domingo performed as Samson in the 1981 San Francisco Opera production co-starring Shirley Verrett, under Julius Rudel and at the Metropolitan Opera's 1998 production with Olga Borodina. More recent productions of the opera by the Metropolitan have been in 2006, with Marina Domashenko and Olga Borodina alternating as Delilah, and in 2018 with Elīna Garanča and Roberto Alagna. The Lyric Opera of Chicago gave their first performance of the opera in November 1962 with Rita Gorr as Delilah and Hans Kaart as Samson. The company has revived the work numerous times since then, most recently in their 2003/2004 season with Olga Borodina as Dalila and José Cura as Samson. Likewise, the San Francisco Opera has staged the opera 10 times during its history giving its first performance in 1925, with Marguerite d'Alvarez and Fernand Ansseau in the principal roles, and its most recent performance in 2008, with Borodina and Clifton Forbis.

Samson et Dalila became a consistent presence in the opera houses of Europe. By 1920, the Paris Opéra alone had given more than five hundred performances of the opera. In the decades after World War II, it was less often heard by European audiences; but since the 1980s it has regained much of its former Continental popularity. Recent European productions include performances at La Scala, Milan, in 2002 (Domingo and Borodina); the Royal Opera House, Covent Garden, in 2004 (Denyce Graves and José Cura), 2022 (Elīna Garanča and SeokJong Baek) and again in 2026 (Aigul Akhmetshina and SeokJong Baek); the Royal Swedish Opera in 2008 (Anna Larsson and Lars Cleveman). On October 10, 2025, Samson et Dalila became the first opera premiere of the 106th season of the Slovak National Theatre (SND) in Bratislava. This iconic work of Saint-Saëns returned to Bratislava almost a century after its initial performance in 1927. Since then, the opera has been staged twice in Slovakia: in Košice in 1970 and again in 2019.

"Vois ma misère, hélas!" ("Behold my misery, alas!", act 3, scene 1)
Enrico Caruso premiered the role of Samson at the Metropolitan Opera in New York City during its 1915/1916 season and recorded "Vois ma misère, hélas!" in 1916.

Throughout its history, Samson et Dalila has served as a star vehicle for many singers. The role of Delilah is considered to be one of the great opera roles for the mezzo-soprano.

== Libretto ==
Although the libretto of Samson et Dalila is taken from Chapter 16 of the Book of Judges, the opera does not include the accounts of Samson's heroic deeds which earned him both fame and leadership among the Hebrews. The accounts of Samson's slaying of a lion and his triumph over 1000 Philistines while wielding only the jawbone of an ass are omitted. Saint-Saëns and his librettist most likely made this choice so the story would concentrate on Dalila. Samson, therefore, is presented as an inspiring leader rather than the almost supernatural hero of the Bible. It is his vulnerable, tender heart and his susceptibility to the protestations of love from a dissembling woman that is the focus of the plot. Delilah is portrayed as a manipulative, conniving, ruthless woman bent on revenge. Samson's numerous attempts to conceal the secret of his strength in the Biblical account are only referenced by Dalila in her duet with the High Priest in the opera, and the revelation that his strength resides in his hair occurs offstage. The opera includes some material not found in the Bible such as the death of Abimélech in act 1.

== Roles ==
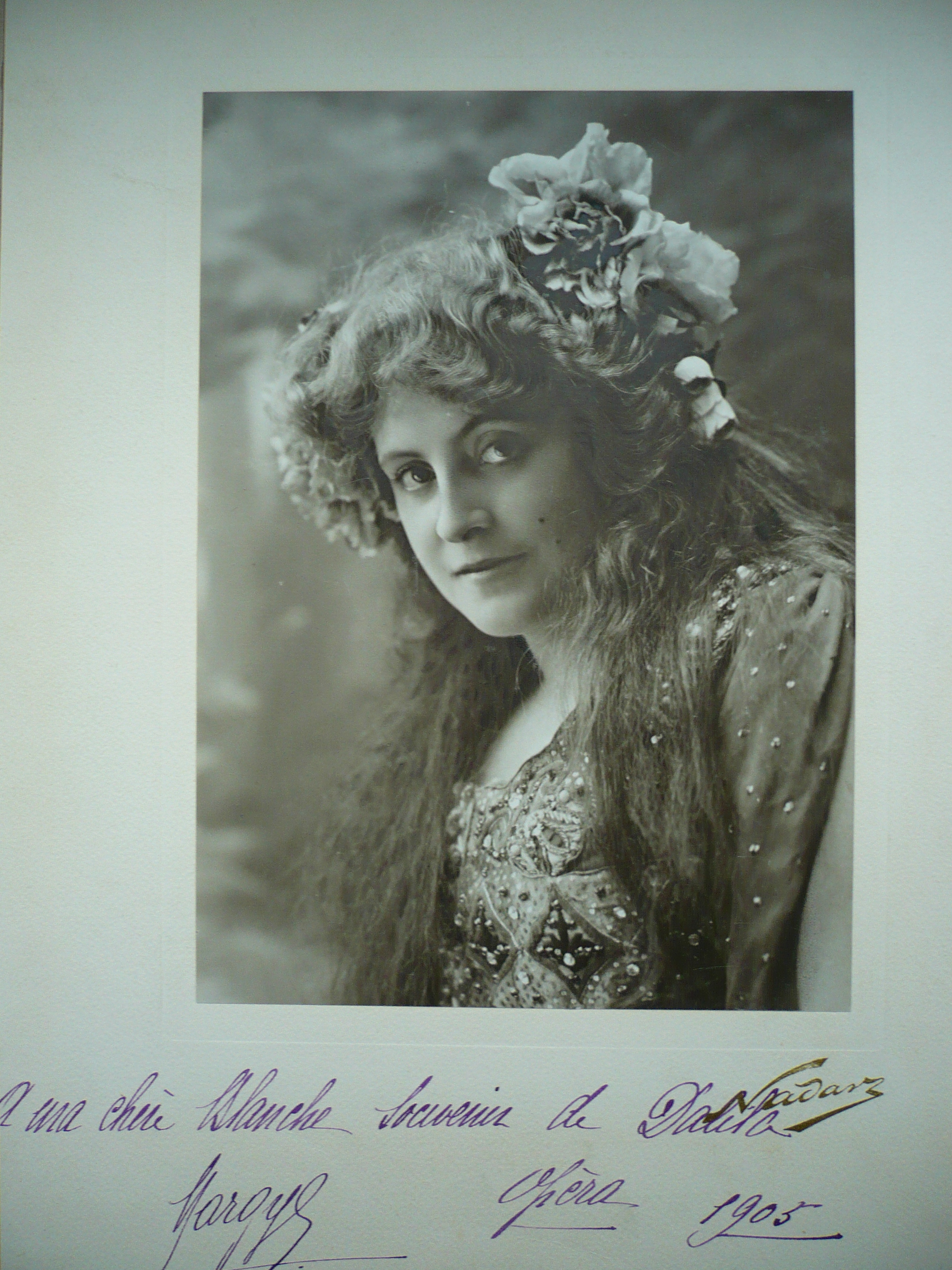
Jane Margyl (1862–1934) in Samson and Delilah (1905)

Role	Voice type	Premiere cast, 2 December 1877 (Conductor: Eduard Lassen)
Samson	tenor	Franz Ferenczy
Dalila	mezzo-soprano or contralto	Auguste von Müller
High Priest of Dagon	baritone	Hans von Milde
Abimélech, satrap of Philistine	bass	Dengler
First Philistine	tenor	Karl Knopp
Second Philistine	bass	Felix Schmidt
Philistine Messenger	tenor	Winiker
Old Hebrew	bass	Adolf Hennig
Hebrews and Philistines

== Synopsis ==
Place: Kingdom of Israel and Judea
Time: c. 1150 BC

=== Act 1 ===
A square in Israel at night

In a square outside the temple of Dagon, a group of Hebrews beg Jehovah for relief from their bondage to the Philistines in a melancholy chorus ("Dieu d'Israël – God of Israel"), which leads into a fugue ("Nous avons vu nos cités renversées – We have seen our cities overturned"). Samson tries to revive the Israelites' morale and faith in God ("Arrêtez, ô mes frères – Stop, O my brothers") in a rousing aria set against the chorus's continuous prayer. Abimelech, the Philistine governor, appears and taunts the Israelites, saying that they are helpless because their god has abandoned them. He further states that his god, Dagon, is far superior ("Ce Dieu que votre voix implore – This God that your voice implores"). The Hebrews cower in fear before Abimelech until Samson incites them into defiant action. Enraged, Abimelech attacks an unarmed Samson with his sword. Samson manages to wrest the sword from Abimelech and kills him.

Afraid of what might now happen, the Hebrews flee, abandoning Samson. The High Priest of Dagon comes from the Philistine temple and curses the Hebrews and Samson's prodigious strength. A messenger arrives and informs the High Priest that the Hebrews are destroying the harvest. He responds with a further curse that alludes to his plot to utilize Dalila's beauty to outwit Samson's strength ("Qu'enfin une compagne infâme trahisse son amour! – Finally an infamous companion betrays his love!").

As dawn breaks the Hebrews lift up a humble prayer to God in a style reminiscent of plainchant. Out of the temple emerges Dalila along with several priestesses of Dagon. As they walk down the temple steps, they sing of the pleasures of spring. Dalila engages seductively with Samson proclaiming that he has won her heart and bids him to come with her to her home in the valley of Sorek. As she tries to charm him, a trio forms as an old Hebrew warns of the danger this woman presents and Samson prays for God's protection from Dalila's charms. In an attempt to seduce Samson away from his leadership of the Israelite uprising, Dalila and the priestesses begin a sexually charged dance for him accompanied by a tambourine. After the dance, Dalila sings how spring is blossoming all around her yet, in her heart, she feels like it is still winter ("Printemps qui commence – Spring begins"). As Samson struggles with his desire for Dalila, the old Hebrew repeats his cautionary plea. His warning, however, is made in vain and the curtain closes as Samson meets Dalila's gaze with every intention of going to her nearby dwelling.

=== Act 2 ===
Delilah's retreat in the Valley of Sorek

Dalila knows that Samson is entranced with her and will come to her instead of leading the revolution against the Philistines. Sitting on a rock outside the entrance to her retreat, she sings triumphantly about her power to ensnare Samson. She says that all of his strength is hopeless to withstand love's onslaught ("Amour! viens aider ma faiblesse – Love! come help my weakness").

Distant lightning is seen as the High Priest arrives to report that Samson and the Hebrews have conquered the Philistines. He attempts to achieve Samson's capture by offering Dalila gold, but she refuses saying she cares not for money but only for revenge. Her desire to hurt Samson is motivated solely by her loyalty to her gods and her hatred for the Hebrews. Dalila and the High Priest sing a duet expressing their mutual abhorrence for Samson and the Hebrews. Dalila vows to discover the secret of Samson's strength.

Now alone, Dalila contemplates her chances of success. Samson, intent on taking his place as the leader of the Hebrew revolt, emerges to say his last farewell as distant lightning is once again seen. In an attempt to close the trap which she has set for Samson, Dalila tells Samson seductively that she is completely his if he wants her. She begs him to respond to her caresses, hoping that he will finally let go of all other things and concentrate completely on her. His admission Je t'aime! introduces her main aria "Mon cœur s'ouvre à ta voix – My heart opens to your voice", which becomes a duet on the second verse when Samson joins her in song. Now that Dalila has him in her power, she feigns disbelief in his constancy and demands that he show his love by confiding in her the secret of his strength. Samson hears rolling thunder again which now seems like a warning from God and refuses. Dalila weeps and scorns Samson and runs into her dwelling. Samson is momentarily torn but then follows Dalila inside. Not long afterward, having finally learned that the secret of Samson's strength is his long hair, she calls to hidden Philistine soldiers, who rush in to capture and blind Samson.

=== Act 3 ===
"Danse Bacchanale"
Performed by the United States Air Force Band

The city of Gaza

Scene 1: In a dungeon at Gaza

His hair shorn and now blind and shackled, Samson is turning a mill-wheel and praying for his people, who will suffer for his sin. He hears their voices, echoing the Hebrews' lament from act 1. Overcome with remorse, Samson offers his life in sacrifice, while the Hebrews are heard in the distance lamenting his fate.

Scene 2: In the Temple of Dagon

A musical interlude is played as the scene changes to the temple of Dagon, where the Philistines are preparing a sacrifice to commemorate their victory. The priests and priestesses of Dagon sing softly, reprising the song to spring from act 1. The music turns savage as the priests dance a wild Bacchanale. Following the dance, Samson enters led by a boy. He is ridiculed by the High Priest and the crowd. Dalila taunts Samson further by recounting to him the details of her devious plot in a variant of her love song. When the priests try to force him to kneel before Dagon, he asks the boy to lead him to the two main pillars of the temple, then telling the child to flee. Samson prays to God to restore his strength, and pushes down the pillars and the temple with them, crushing himself and his enemies. The curtain falls.
