= Javotte (Saint-Saëns) =

One act ballet by Camile Saint-Saëns

- by Camille Saint-Saëns
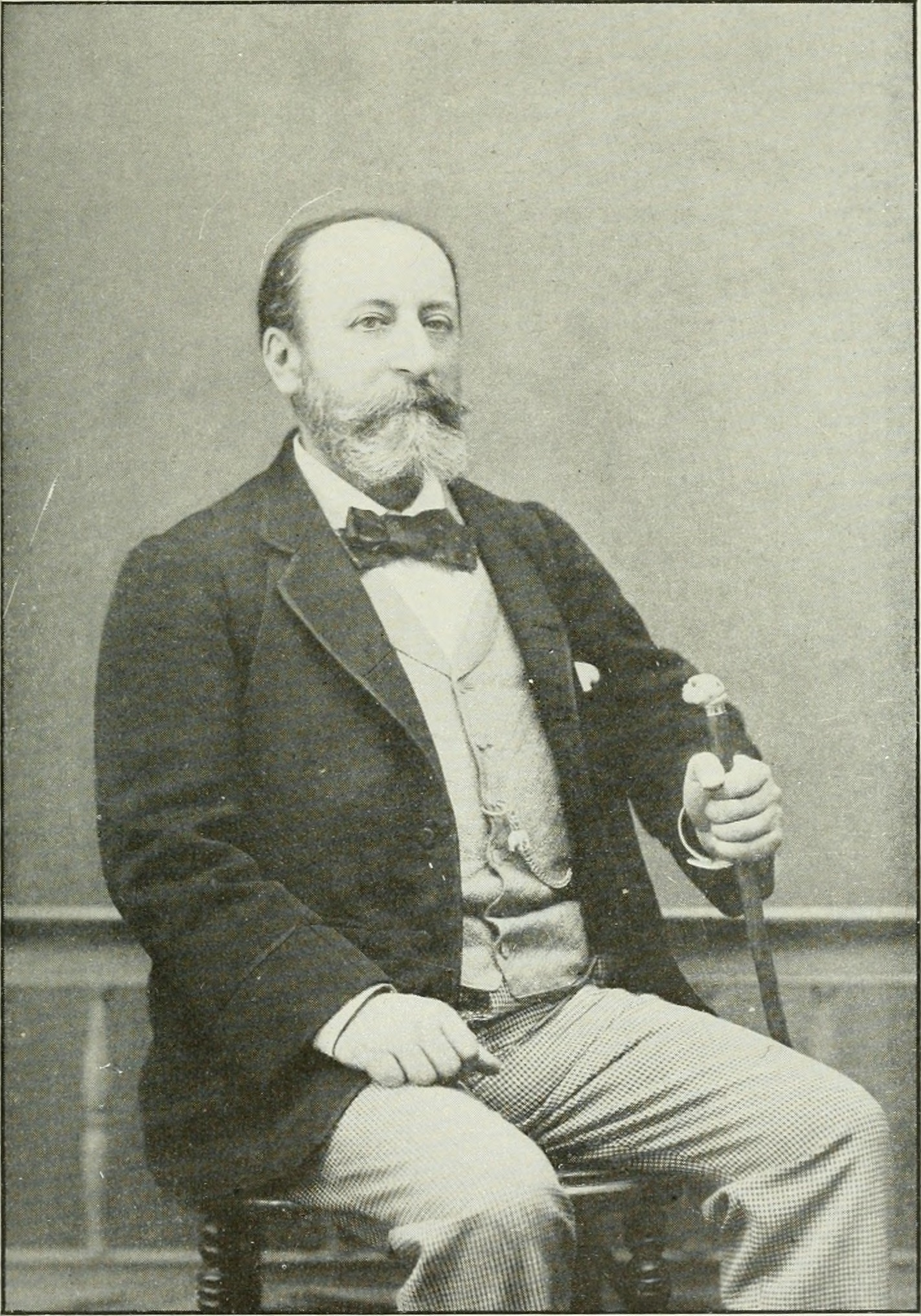
- Opus: None
- Period: Romantic
- Genre: Ballet
- Composed: 1896
- Movements: 3
- Scoring: Full orchestra

Premiere
- Date: December 3, 1896
- Location: Grand Théâtre of Lyon

Javotte by Camille Saint-Saëns is a ballet written in 1896 and was premiered the same year. The work is notated for full orchestra.

== Background ==
By 1896, Saint-Saëns had written eight operas, yet only Samson and Delilah had seen success.

The idea of Javotte was proposed to Saint-Saëns by Jean-Louis Croze, the two having previously collaborated. Croze would write the libretto for the ballet, loosely basing it on La fille mal gardée. The work was originally to be produced at the Théâtre Marigny where Croze worked, but the theater ran into financial difficulties. The ballet was then jointly backed by the Grand Theatre in Lyon and La Monnaie in Brussels.

Days before its premiere, Saint-Saëns reportedly told the publisher, Auguste Durand, "This short ballet will appeal because it is essentially joyful". The work would premier on December 3, 1896, in Lyon's Grand Theater.

== Structure ==
The ballet consists of one act that is split into three tableaus:

1. La fête au village
2. La maison
3. La reine du bal

== Plot ==
The first tableau is set in the a village square, where there is a festival. Jean waits for Javotte, the ballet's titular character, to arrive and declines the advances of other women. Javotte arrives and dances with Jean until her parents appear and forcibly remove her.

The second tableau is set in Javotte's home. Javotte is locked inside by her parents and forced to do chores but is repeatedly distracted by daydreams of her dances with Jean. Jean enters the cottage through a window and escapes with Javotte. Javotte's parents return and begin to search for their daughter with the help of a constable.

The third tableau returns to the festival where there is a dance competition being held. The competition will decide who will be crowned queen of the festival. After several unimpressive performances, Javotte takes the stage and wins the competition. Her parents appear and are persuaded to accept the marriage between Jean and Javotte.

The ballet ends with a Pas de deux accompanied by four cellos, a danse des coryphées, and a danse générale accompanied by the full orchestra.
