= Martin Rössel =

Swedish musician

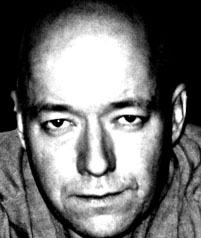

Background information
- Born: 8 April 1959
- Genres: electronic
- Formerly of: Dom Dummaste

Martin Rössel (born 8 April 1959), is a Swedish musician and producer. Together with Lars Cleveman, he founded Sweden's first electronic underground group, Dom Dummaste.

He later ran a recording studio in Stockholm together with Marty Willson-Piper of The Church. His solo records include "Martin Rössel" (1987), "Tivolit" (1989), and "Resan..." (1990). He also collaborated on Marty Willson-Piper's solo records "Rhyme" (1989) and "Spirit Level" (1992), as well as The Church's "Sometime Anywhere" (1994).

Rössel rejoined his old bandmate Lars Cleveman, with whom he recorded "Prayer of Love" (2004) and "Memento" (2012) under the name Cleveman Rössel.
