= Eduard Lassen =

Belgian-Danish composer and conductor

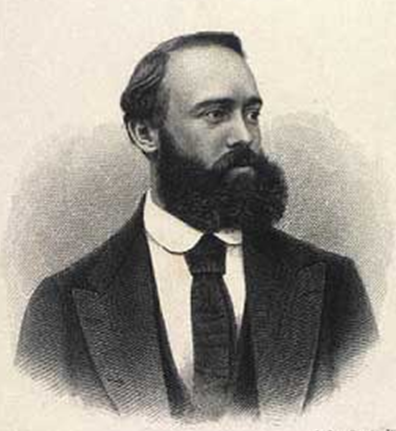

Eduard Lassen (13 April 1830 – 15 January 1904) was a Belgian-Danish composer and conductor. Although of Danish birth, he spent most of his career working as the music director at the court in Weimar. A moderately prolific composer, Lassen produced music in a variety of genres including operas, symphonic works, piano works, lieder, and choral works among others. His most successful pieces were his fine vocal art songs for solo voice and piano which often used elements of German and Belgian folk music.

== Biography ==
He was born in Copenhagen, but was taken as a child to Brussels to which his father was president of the Jewish Consistor of Belgium. He was educated at the Brussels Conservatory where he earned prizes for piano (1844) and composition (1847). He won the Prix de Rome in 1851, which provided him with the opportunity to make a long tour in Germany and Italy. While touring he met Louis Spohr and Franz Liszt and composed much of his first opera Le roi Edgard. After returning to Brussels in 1855, Lassen actively sought to get his opera performed but was unable to do so. Liszt, however, agreed to produce the opera at the Grossherzogliches Theater (now the Staatskapelle Weimar) and the work premiered in Weimar in 1857. The following year, Liszt recommended Lassen as his replacement as the court music director in Weimar, which involved conducting both the opera and the court orchestra. He happily took the job and remained in that role until his retirement in 1895. While there he conducted several world premieres including the first performance of Camille Saint-Saëns's Samson et Dalila in 1877. He also conducted the first performance in Weimar, and the first outside Munich, of Wagner's Tristan und Isolde (1874).

He remained in Weimar after his retirement and died there in 1904, shortly after receiving an honorary doctorate from the University of Jena.

== Works ==
A moderately prolific composer, Lassen produced four operas, a significant amount of instrumental music to stage plays, two symphonies (in D major, performed 1867/published 1868 and C major, Op. 78, published 1884), a Violin Concerto in D major, Op.87 (1888), a festival march for symphony orchestra, two overtures, and 11 character pieces for piano. He also produced a significant amount of choral music, lieder, and art songs for voice and piano.

Lassen's operas, Landgraf Ludwig's Brautfahrt (1857), Frauenlob (1861), and Le Captif (1868), did not have lasting success, though his music to Goethe's Faust (1876) gained popularity and was praised by Franz Liszt. His incidental music to Hebbel's Die Nibelungen (1873) was also well known. In 1878–79, Liszt combined excerpts from both these works in a single piano transcription, Aus der Musik zu Hebbels Nibelungen und Goethes Faust (S.496).

Lassen's solo songs and duets show a variety of treatment from the folklike Sei nur ruhig, lieber Robin or the songs with dance rhythms to the through-composed Abendlandschaft (with its more interesting modulations and accompaniment) to the rhapsodic and improvisatory Ich hab im Traum geweinet. Many of his songs, for instance Vöglein wohin so schnell, were translated into both English and French and were popular at the end of the 19th century.
