= Paul Marcelles =

French musician

Marcel Paul Roger Fournier called Paul Marcelles, (16 November 1863 – 25 May 1947) was a French composer of songs, theatre music and ballet.

== Life ==
Fournier was born in Paris. A student of the École Centrale Paris and, for music, of André Gedalge, he is credited with numerous pantomimes, song scores, and works for the stage. He made a name for himself in 1891 with Pierrette Doctoresse, a one-act pantomime by Gaston Guérin.

== Work ==
- 1891: Pierrette Doctoresse, pantomime en 1 acte, de Gaston Guérin: Cercle Mathurins
- 1891: Ludus pro patria, one act pantomime, by Henry Gerbault and Henri Arthus : Bodinière, 15 December
- 1891: Veuve Prosper, successeur, operetta in 3 acts, by Adrien Vély and Alévy : Théâtre Déjazet
- 1894: Une bonne soirée, One act comedy by Adrien Vély and Alévy, music by Paul Marcelles : Théâtre de l'Ambigu
- 1898: L'Enlèvement des Sabines, ballet-pantomime by Adrien Vély and Charles Dutreil, music by Paul Marcelles : Folies-Bergère, (September 1898)
- 1899: Les Babylones, lyrical prophecy in 23 scenes by Adrien Vély, music by Paul Marcelles
- 1901: La Danse à travers les âges !, rondeau, lyrics by Marcel de Germiny, music by Marcel Fournier (Paul Marcelles)
- 1902: Le Minotaure, three acts operetta, lyrics by Charles Clairville and Adrien Vély, music by Paul Marcelles
- 1903: Le Prince consort, fantasy comedy in 3 acts by Léon Xanrof and Jules Chancel, music by Paul Marcelles
- 1904: Deux Fables by Miguel Zamacoïs, set in music by Paul Marcelles
- 1904: Voluptata, operetta in two acts and four scenes, by P.-L. Flers and Charles Clairville, music by Paul Marcelles : Moulin-Rouge, 20 January
- 1907: Au drapeau, national epic in sixteen scenes, words by Gaston Guérin, shadow theatre by Amédée Vignola
- 1907: Les Babylones, prophétie lyrique by Adrien Vély, music by M. Paul Marcelles
- undated: Pour la Patrie, shadow theatre, music by Paul Marcelles, lyrics by Amédée Vignola
