= List of French films of 1937 =

French films released in 1937

A list of films produced in France in 1937:

== A-L ==
Title	Director	Cast	Genre	Notes
The Alibi	Pierre Chenal	Erich von Stroheim, Jany Holt , Albert Préjean	Mystery	
Aloha, le chant des îles	Léon Mathot	Jean Murat, Danièle Parola, Arletty	Adventure	
Arsene Lupin, Detective	Henri Diamant-Berger	Jules Berry, Gabriel Signoret, Suzy Prim	Crime	
Ballerina	Jean Benoît-Lévy, Marie Epstein	Yvette Chauviré, Mia Slavenska, Janine Charrat	Drama	
Balthazar	Pierre Colombier	Jules Berry, Danièle Parola, André Alerme	Comedy	
The Beauty of Montparnasse	Maurice Cammage	Frédéric Duvallès, Jeanne Aubert, Colette Darfeuil	Comedy	
Beethoven's Great Love	Abel Gance	Harry Baur, Annie Ducaux, Jany Holt	Biopic	
Bizarre, Bizarre	Marcel Carné	Louis Jouvet, Michel Simon, Françoise Rosay	Comedy	
Blanchette	Pierre Caron	Marie Bell, Jean Martinelli, Abel Tarride	Drama	
Boissière	Fernand Rivers	Andrée Spinelly, Pierre Renoir, Suzanne Desprès	Drama	
Boulot the Aviator	Maurice de Canonge	Robert Arnoux, Michel Simon, Marguerite Moreno	Comedy	
Chaste Susanne	André Berthomieu	Raimu, Meg Lemonnier, Henri Garat	Comedy	Co-production with Britain
The Cheat	Marcel L'Herbier	Victor Francen, Sessue Hayakawa, Louis Jouvet	Drama	
Cinderella	Pierre Caron	Joan Warner, Christiane Delyne, Maurice Escande	Comedy	
The Citadel of Silence	Marcel L'Herbier	Annabella, Pierre Renoir, Bernard Lancret	Drama	
Claudine at School	Serge de Poligny	Max Dearly, Pierre Brasseur, Suzet Maïs	Comedy	
The Club of Aristocrats	Pierre Colombier	Jules Berry, Elvire Popesco, Viviane Romance	Comedy	
The Courier of Lyon	Claude Autant-Lara, Maurice Lehmann	Pierre Blanchar, Dita Parlo , Sylvia Bataille	Historical	
Culprit	Raymond Bernard	Pierre Blanchar, Gabriel Signoret, Madeleine Ozeray	Drama	
The Dark Angels	Willy Rozier	Suzy Prim, Paul Bernard, Henri Rollan	Drama	
Désiré	Sacha Guitry	Jacqueline Delubac, Jacques Baumer, Arletty	Comedy	
Double Crime in the Maginot Line	Félix Gandéra	Victor Francen, Véra Korène, Jacques Baumer	Mystery	
The Drunkard	Jean Kemm	Germaine Rouer, Jean Debucourt, Jacqueline Daix	Drama	
Francis the First	Christian-Jaque	Fernandel, Mona Goya, Alexandre Rignault	Comedy	
The Fraudster	Léopold Simons	Félicien Tramel, Ginette Leclerc, Robert Lynen	Drama	
Gigolette	Yvan Noé	Florelle, Gabriel Gabrio, Rosine Deréan	Drama	
Grand Illusion	Jean Renoir	Jean Gabin, Pierre Fresnay, Erich von Stroheim	War drama	Nominated for Oscar, +3 wins, +1 nomination
The Green Jacket	Roger Richebé	Elvire Popesco, Victor Boucher, Jules Berry	Comedy	
Grey's Thirteenth Investigation	Pierre Maudru	Maurice Lagrenée, Raymond Cordy, Colette Darfeuil	Crime	
Gribouille	Marc Allégret	Raimu, Michèle Morgan, Gilbert Gil	Comedy	
Harvest	Marcel Pagnol	Fernandel, Orane Demazis, Gabriel Gabrio	Drama	
The House Opposite	Christian-Jaque	Elvire Popesco, André Lefaur, Pierre Stéphen	Comedy	
Ignace	Pierre Colombier	Fernandel, Fernand Charpin, Alice Tissot	Comedy	
In Venice, One Night	Christian-Jaque	Albert Préjean, Elvire Popesco, Roger Karl	Comedy	
Josette	Christian-Jaque	Fernandel, Mona Goya, Lucien Rozenberg	Comedy	
The Kings of Sport	Pierre Colombier	Raimu, Fernandel, Jules Berry, Lisette Lanvin	Comedy	
The Kiss of Fire	Augusto Genina	Tino Rossi, Michel Simon, Mireille Balin, Viviane Romance	Romance	
The Ladies in the Green Hats	Maurice Cloche	Alice Tissot, Micheline Cheirel, Mady Berry	Comedy	
The Lady from Vittel	Roger Goupillières	Alice Field, Frédéric Duvallès, Fernand Charpin	Comedy	
Lady Killer	Jean Grémillon	Jean Gabin, Mireille Balin, Pierre Magnier	Drama	
The Lie of Nina Petrovna	Viktor Tourjansky	Isa Miranda, Fernand Gravey, Annie Vernay	Drama	
Life Dances On	Julien Duvivier	Harry Baur, Marie Bell, Françoise Rosay	Drama	

== M-Z ==
Title	Director	Cast	Genre	Notes
Madelon's Daughter	Georges Pallu	Henri Garat, Hélène Robert, Ninon Vallin	Comedy drama	
Mademoiselle ma mère	Henri Decoin	Danielle Darrieux, Pierre Brasseur, Pierre Larquey	Comedy	
The Man from Nowhere	Pierre Chenal	Pierre Blanchar, Isa Miranda, Ginette Leclerc	Drama	
The Man of the Hour	Julien Duvivier	Maurice Chevalier, Elvire Popesco, Josette Day	Musical	
A Man to Kill	Léon Mathot	Jean Murat, Jules Berry, Viviane Romance	Spy thriller	
Marthe Richard	Raymond Bernard	Edwige Feuillère, Erich von Stroheim, Marcel Dalio	Spy thriller	
Men of Prey	Willy Rozier	Jeanne Boitel, Jean Galland, Jean-Max	Crime drama	
The Men Without Names	Jean Vallée	Constant Rémy, Tania Fédor, Lucien Gallas	Action	
The Messenger	Raymond Rouleau	Gaby Morlay, Jean Gabin, Jean-Pierre Aumont	Drama	
Miarka	Jean Choux	Suzanne Desprès, Marcel Dalio, José Noguero	Drama	
Monsieur Bégonia	André Hugon	Josette Day, Paul Pauley, Colette Darfeuil	Comedy	
My Aunts and I	Yvan Noé	René Lefèvre, Marguerite Moreno, Jacqueline Francell	Comedy	
My Little Marquise	Robert Péguy	Josseline Gaël, Paul Pauley, André Bervil	Comedy	
Nights of Fire	Marcel L'Herbier	Gaby Morlay, Victor Francen, Madeleine Robinson	Drama	
Paris	Jean Choux	Harry Baur, Renée Saint-Cyr, Camille Bert	Comedy	
The Pearls of the Crown	Sacha Guitry, Christian-Jaque	Jacqueline Delubac, Renée Saint-Cyr, Lyn Harding	Historical	
Pépé le Moko	Julien Duvivier	Jean Gabin, Mireille Balin, Gabriel Gabrio	Crime drama	2 wins
A Picnic on the Grass	Marcel Cravenne	Gaby Morlay, Jules Berry, Josseline Gaël	Comedy	
The Red Dancer	Jean-Paul Paulin	Véra Korène, Maurice Escande, Jean Galland	Drama	
Romarin	André Hugon	Jean Aquistapace, Yvette Lebon, Antonin Berval	Comedy	
Sarati the Terrible	André Hugon	Harry Baur, Jacqueline Laurent, George Rigaud	Drama	
The Secrets of the Red Sea	Richard Pottier	Harry Baur, Gaby Basset, Alexandre Mihalesco	Adventure	
The Silent Battle	Pierre Billon	Käthe von Nagy, Pierre Fresnay, Michel Simon	Thriller	
Sisters in Arms	Léon Poirier	Jeanne Sully, Josette Day, Thomy Bourdelle	War drama	
Southern Mail	Pierre Billon	Pierre Richard-Willm, Jany Holt, Charles Vanel	Action	
Street of Shadows	G.W. Pabst	Dita Parlo, Pierre Fresnay, Viviane Romance	Thriller	
White Cargo	Robert Siodmak	Käthe von Nagy, Jean-Pierre Aumont, Jules Berry	Drama	
Widow's Island	Claude Heymann	Pierre Renoir, Marcelle Chantal, Aimé Clariond	Drama	
Woman of Malacca	Marc Allégret	Edwige Feuillère, Pierre Richard-Willm, Jacques Copeau	Drama	
A Woman of No Importance	Jean Choux	Pierre Blanchar, Lisette Lanvin, Marguerite Templey	Drama	
Yoshiwara	Max Ophüls	Pierre Richard-Willm, Sessue Hayakawa, Roland Toutain	Drama	

== See also ==
- 1937 in France
