= 1931 in science fiction =

The year 1931 was marked, in science fiction, by the following events.

== Births and deaths ==
=== Births ===
- January 9 : Algis Budrys, American writer, (d. 2008)
- January 28 : Sakyo Komatsu, Japan writer, (d. 2011)
- December 3 : Bob Shaw, British writer, (d. 1996)

== Literary releases ==
=== Novels ===
- (in French) Druso oder : die gestohlene Menschheit, by (in German) Friedrich Freksa.

== Movies ==
- Frankenstein, by James Whale.
- End of the World, by Abel Gance.
- A Connecticut Yankee, by David Butler.

== Awards ==
The main science-fiction Awards known at the present time did not exist at this time.

== See also ==
- 1931 in science
