= Paul Madeux =

Paul Madeux was a French film director, film producer and screenwriter.

== Filmography ==
Production assistant

- 1935 : Lucrezia Borgia by Abel Gance

Production director

- 1932: Mimi Pandore by Roger Capellani
- 1936: L'Assaut by Pierre-Jean Ducis
- 1936: Au son des guitares by Pierre-Jean Ducis
- 1937: Au soleil de Marseille by Pierre-Jean Ducis
- 1937: Le Porte-veine by André Berthomieu
- 1938: Le Petit chose by Maurice Cloche
- 1938: Le Révolté by Robert Bibal and Léon Mathot
- 1939: Le Duel by Pierre Fresnay
- 1939: Le jour se lève by Marcel Carné
- 1940: L’École des femmes by Max Ophüls (unfinished)
- 1941: Parade en sept nuits by Marc Allégret
- 1942: Une femme disparaît by Jacques Feyder
- 1946: Last Refuge by Marc Maurette
- 1947: Bethsabée by Léonide Moguy

Assistant director

- 1927 : The Love of Sunya by Albert Parker

Director

- 1936 : You Can't Fool Antoinette

Screenwriter

- 1938 :Education of a Prince by Alexander Esway
