= Agent Cody Banks 2: Destination London =

2004 film by Kevin Allen

- Theatrical release poster
- Directed by: Kevin Allen
- Screenplay by: Don Rhymer
- Story by: Harald Zwart; Dylan Sellers; Don Rhymer
- Based on: Characters by Jeffrey Jurgensen
- Produced by: David Glasser; Bob Yari; Guy Oseary; David Nicksay; Evan Plummer; Dylan Sellers
- Starring: Frankie Muniz; Anthony Anderson; Hannah Spearritt; Cynthia Stevenson; Daniel Roebuck; Keith David
- Cinematography: Denis Crossan
- Edited by: Andrew MacRitchie
- Music by: Mark Thomas
- Production companies: Metro-Goldwyn-Mayer Pictures; Splendid Pictures; Maverick Films; Dylan Sellers Productions
- Distributed by: MGM Distribution Co. (United States and Canada); 20th Century Fox (International)
- Release date: March 12, 2004
- Running time: 100 minutes
- Country: United States
- Language: English
- Budget: $26 million
- Box office: $29 million

Agent Cody Banks 2: Destination London is a 2004 American spy action-comedy film and the sequel to the 2003 film Agent Cody Banks. Directed by Kevin Allen and written by Don Rhymer, the film stars Frankie Muniz, Anthony Anderson, Hannah Spearritt, and Keith David. The film takes place in London with Cody and his buffoonish adult partner, Derek, trying to recover a stolen software and stop the activation of the government's mind control project.

Agent Cody Banks 2 was released by MGM in the United States on March 12, 2004, by 20th Century Fox. It received generally negative reviews from critics, and grossed $29 million against a $26 million budget.

== Plot ==
Agent Cody Banks attends summer camp, which is actually a secret training facility for undercover teenage agents in the CIA. When a group of soldiers attempt to abduct head counselor Victor Diaz, Cody helps him escape, mistaking the CIA operation for a training exercise. The CIA director informs Cody that Diaz stole disks containing plans for a secret mind-control device, and sends Cody to recapture him.

In the United Kingdom, Cody poses as a summer orchestra student at the Kenworth estate to spy on owner Lord Duncan Kenworth, suspected of working with Diaz, supported by his handler, Derek and Kumar, Derek's right-hand man, who are disguised as a chef hired by Lady Josephine Kenworth and a taxi driver respectively. Whilst keeping his mission a secret from his fellow students, Cody sneaks around the estate and confirms that Diaz and Duncan are working together and that they have a working prototype of the mind control device.

The next day, Cody breaks into a lab owned by Duncan, where he sees the finished device: a microchip inserted as a filling into a tooth cavity by dentist Santiago. Cody and Derek chase Diaz through London streets, but Cody is instead arrested and taken to Scotland Yard. He is later freed by fellow student Emily Sommers, who is actually an undercover MI6 agent. While Emily is distracted, Diaz's henchmen takes Cody hostage and implant him with the microchip.

Under Duncan, Santiago, and Diaz's influence, Cody meets the CIA director on a London bus who is then also converted. Emily, having secretly witnessed the events, enlists Derek's help to get the microchip out of Cody. After knocking out Cody, Derek carefully cuts up one of Cody's gadgets, exploding Mentos mints, into a precisely minuscule amount to safely remove it. The group later realizes Diaz intends to implant the world leaders, who are all in London for a G7 summit at Buckingham Palace.

Deducing that with the CIA director under Diaz's control, Cody, Derek, and Emily may be put on the most wanted list. The trio infiltrate the party before the summit. There, they realize that most of the dignitaries have already been implanted and Duncan was appointed director of the Royal Mint by the British Prime Minister. They explain the truth to the other students, who perform for the guests and urge them to keep the world leaders from attending the G7 summit. They later proceed to do so with an impromptu but rousing performance of "War", whilst Cody, Emily, and Derek search for the villains. Derek is implanted with the microchip and is set on Cody by Santiago. Before Santiago can kill him through Derek, Emily finds and subdues him, disabling the mind control software and rescuing the U.S. president, who was to be implanted.

Shortly after Cody kicks out Derek's microchip, the two of them remove the CIA director's microchip. Diaz attempts to flee, but he is captured by Cody in the Queen's gift room. Duncan also attempts to escape but is tripped by Trival Jenkins, his apparently senile and blind butler, who turns out to be Emily's handler. Duncan is arrested with Diaz and Santiago.

After the three villains are arrested, Cody returns to America, and both he and Emily promise to keep in contact. Alongside Cody returning to America as a reward, Derek also returned to the camp and replaced Diaz as head counselor. Cody's parents pick him up, completely oblivious to the summer camp. Alex, Cody's younger brother tries to eat a few of his explosive Mentos, but Cody tosses them into the pond where they explode harmlessly.

== Cast ==
- Frankie Muniz as Cody Banks, a 16-year-old teenager working for the CIA as an undercover junior agent
- Anthony Anderson as Derek Bowman, Cody's new agent partner. He replaces Ronica Miles, Cody's original partner in the first movie who was portrayed by Angie Harmon.
- Hannah Spearritt as Emily Sommers, Cody's fellow orchestra student and second love interest who is actually a British undercover operative. She replaces Natalie Connors, Cody Banks' original love interest in the first movie who was portrayed by Hilary Duff.
- Cynthia Stevenson as Mrs. Banks, Cody's mother
- Daniel Roebuck as Mr. Banks, Cody's father
- Anna Chancellor as Lady Josephine Kenworth, a governess of the International Youth Orchestra
- Keith Allen as Victor Diaz, a rogue CIA agent who is in charge of a mind control program
- James Faulkner as Lord Duncan Kenworth, a corrupt English businessman who is working for Diaz
- David Kelly as Trival Jenkins, a senile and blind butler who turns out to be Emily's handler
- Santiago Segura as Dr. Santiago, a dimwitted scientist who works with Diaz and Kenworth to try to take over the world
- Connor Widdows as Alex Banks, Cody's 11-year-old brother
- Keith David as the CIA Director
- Paul Kaye as Neville, Derek's hysterical and quirky assistant who helps Cody with a variety of gadgets
- Mark Williams as Inspector Crescent
- Rod Silvers as Kumar, Derek's right-hand man
- Jack Stanley as Ryan
- Olivia Adams as Gabrielle
- Don Jones as George
- Joshua Brody as Bender
- Sarah McNicholas as Marisa
- Alfie Allen as Johan Berchamp
- Leilah Isaac as Sabeen – Bassoon Player
- Keiron Nelson as Habu – French Horn Player
- Ray Donn as Soldier (uncredited)

== Production ==
The director of the first Cody Banks film, Harald Zwart, was initially poised to return but left over financial disagreements. MGM executives disputed Zwart's figures, saying that twice they had bumped up the film's budget during negotiations to meet his expectations. The proposed budget had moved north of $30 million, with the price rising moderately, as often happens with sequels. Director Kevin Allen was offered the directing job after MGM brass were impressed with his indie comedies. An executive mandate for the film was for less reliance on CGI setpieces and placing more emphasis on comedy with Allen saying of the mandate, "If you ain't got the money, make 'em laugh."

Agent Cody Banks 2: Destination London filmed in London and Cobham Hall in Kent where the Gilt Room doubled as the Queen's gift room at Buckingham Palace as Cody Banks (Frankie Muniz) fights Victor Diaz (Keith Allen) in a room full of treasures.

== Reception ==
On review aggregation website Rotten Tomatoes gives the film a 13% rating based on 94 reviews, with an average rating of 3.6/10. The site's consensus reads: "Young kids may find this London adventure fun, but older kids may find it too simplistic." On Metacritic, the film has a score of 32 out of 100 based on reviews from 25 critics, indicating "generally unfavorable reviews". Audiences polled by CinemaScore gave the film an average grade of "B+" on an A+ to F scale. Like the first film, Roger Ebert gave the movie 2 1/2 out of 4 stars.

Agent Cody Banks 2: Destination London opened with $8 million, compared to $14.1 million for its predecessor. It grossed a total of $29 million worldwide.

== Possible sequel and spinoff ==
In 2021, while speaking with Steve-O, Frankie Muniz revealed that MGM had pitched to him two ideas for a family-friendly sequel and an adult-oriented animated series. The sequel would feature Cody Banks training a group of new teenage spies while the series, described as being similar to BoJack Horseman, would feature Banks as a washup trying to regain his spy credibility from his youth.
