= Jocelyn (1933 film) =

1933 film

- Directed by: Pierre Guerlais
- Written by: Alphonse de Lamartine; Pierre Guerlais
- Starring: Samson Fainsilber; Marguerite Weintenberger; Octave Berthier
- Cinematography: Roger Hubert
- Music by: Jean-Jacques Grünenwald
- Release date: December 1933
- Running time: 86 minutes
- Country: France
- Language: French

Jocelyn is a 1933 French historical drama film directed by Pierre Guerlais and starring Samson Fainsilber, Marguerite Weintenberger and Octave Berthier. It was remade in 1952. It is based on the 1836 novel of the same title by Alphonse de Lamartine set during the French Revolution.

== Cast ==
- Samson Fainsilber as Jocelyn
- Marguerite Weintenberger as Laurence
- Octave Berthier as Le pâtre
- Louis Rouyer as L'évéque
- Jacqueline Carlier as Julie
- Blanche Beaume as La mére

== Bibliography ==
- Crisp, Colin. Genre, Myth and Convention in the French Cinema, 1929-1939. Indiana University Press, 2002.
