= The Pont-Biquet Family =

1935 film

- Directed by: Christian-Jaque
- Written by: Suzette Desty; Henri Vendresse
- Based on: The Pont-Biquet Family by Alexandre Bisson
- Produced by: Henri Ullmann
- Starring: Gina Manès; Armand Bernard; Paul Pauley
- Cinematography: Willy Faktorovitch
- Edited by: André Versein
- Music by: Casimir Oberfeld
- Production company: D.U. Films
- Distributed by: Les Films Paramount
- Release date: 20 September 1935
- Running time: 90 minutes
- Country: France
- Language: French

The Pont-Biquet Family (French: La famille Pont-Biquet) is a 1935 French comedy film directed by Christian-Jaque and starring Gina Manès, Armand Bernard and Paul Pauley. It is based on the 1897 play of the same title by Alexandre Bisson. The film's sets were designed by the art directors Henri Ménessier and René Renoux.

== Synopsis ==
The Pont-Biquet is headed my a judge and his domineering wife. Their two daughters and son-in-law try to get round the elder generation.

== Cast ==
- Gina Manès as Carmen
- Armand Bernard as La Reynette
- Paul Pauley as Monsieur Pont-Biquet - juge d'instruction
- Jacqueline Daix as Gabrielle
- Jacques de Féraudy as Dagobert
- Claude Lehmann as Jacques Dubois
- Pierre Stéphen as Toupance
- Alice Tissot as Madame Pont-Biquet

== Bibliography ==
- Bessy, Maurice & Chirat, Raymond. Histoire du cinéma français: 1935-1939. Pygmalion, 1986.
- Crisp, Colin. Genre, Myth and Convention in the French Cinema, 1929-1939. Indiana University Press, 2002.
- Oscherwitz, Dayna & Higgins, MaryEllen . The A to Z of French Cinema. Scarecrow Press, 2009.
- Rège, Philippe. Encyclopedia of French Film Directors, Volume 1. Scarecrow Press, 2009.
