= Jean Chevrier =

French actor

- Postcard
- Born: Jean Dufayard; 25 April 1915; Paris, France
- Died: 13 December 1975 (aged 60); Paris, France
- Resting place: Monaco Cemetery
- Occupation: Actor
- Years active: 1936-1972
- Spouse: Marie Bell

Jean Chevrier (25 April 1915 – 13 December 1975) was a French film actor and member of the Comédie-Française. He appeared in 50 films between 1936 and 1972. He was married to actress Marie Bell. He was buried alongside his wife at the Monaco Cemetery in Monaco.

== Partial filmography ==
- Mademoiselle ma mère (1937) - Un gigolo
- Liberté (1938)
- Three from St Cyr (1939) - Pierre Mercier
- Grandfather (1939) - Gérard Bréval
- The Emigrant (1940) - François Champart
- The Last of the Six (1941) - Jean Perlonjour
- La prière aux étoiles (1941) - Dominique de Ravel
- Andorra ou les hommes d'Airain (1942) - Angelo Xiriball
- The Murderer is Afraid at Night (1942) - Olivier Rol
- La grande marnière (1943) - Pascal Carvajan
- La sévillane (1943) - Rafaelito
- Tornavara (1943) - Gérard Morhange
- Love Around the Clock (1943) - Le condamné
- Paris Frills (1945) - Daniel Rousseau
- The Angel They Gave Me (1946) - François Lemaresquier
- Messieurs Ludovic (1946) - Ludovic Mareuil
- The Mysterious Monsieur Sylvain (1947) - Chantenay
- Woman of Evil (1947) - Diego
- The Ironmaster (1948) - Philippe Derblay
- To the Eyes of Memory (1948) - Le commandant Pierre Aubry
- Le droit de l'enfant (1949) - Jacques Herbelin
- The Voice of Dreams (1949) - Le docteur Rameau
- The White Squadron (1949) - Le capitaine Marsay
- Women and Brigands (1950) - Generale Hugo
- Messalina (1951) - Valerio / Valerius Asiaticus
- The House on the Dune (1952) - L'inspecteur des douanes Lourges
- Je l'ai été trois fois (1952) - Man in front of the hotel (uncredited)
- The Long Teeth (1953) - Walter - le rédacteur en chef
- Endless Horizons (1953) - André Danet
- Royal Affairs in Versailles (1954) - Turenne
- The Big Flag (1954) -Jean Favrel
- The Courier of Moncenisio (1956) - Colonnello napoleonico
- Napoléon (1955) - Le général Duroc
- Men in White (1955) - Dr. Legendre
- Le couteau sous la gorge (1955) - Pacos le Maltais
- Ce soir les jupons volent (1956) - Pierre Roussel
- The Three Musketeers (1959, TV Movie) - Athos
- The Gigolo (1960) - Doctor Dampier
- Amazons of Rome (1961) - Porcenna - Etruscan Leader
- Le captif (1962) - Hamelin
- Phèdre (1968) - Théramène
