= Mirages (1938 film) =

1938 film directed by Alexandre Ryder

- Directed by: Alexandre Ryder
- Written by: François Campaux
- Based on: Mirages by Léopold Marchand
- Produced by: François Campaux
- Starring: Arletty; Jeanne Aubert; Michel Simon
- Cinematography: Léonce-Henri Burel
- Music by: Vincent Scotto
- Production company: Productions François Campaux
- Distributed by: Compagnie Générale Cinématographique
- Release date: 28 January 1938
- Running time: 98 minutes
- Country: France
- Language: French

Mirages (French: Mirages or Si tu m'aimes) is a 1938 French drama film directed by Alexandre Ryder and starring Arletty, Jeanne Aubert and Michel Simon.

== Synopsis ==
It portrays the romance between a woman emerging as a star at the Folies Bergère in Paris and Pierre, an engineer who goes to work on a project in French Algeria.

== Cast ==
- Arletty as Arlette
- Jeanne Aubert as Jeanne Dumont
- Michel Simon as Michel
- Jean-Louis Barrault as Pierre Bonvais
- Pierre Nay as Charles
- Nicole Vattier as Lucie
- Tirmont as Le ténor
- Paul Derval as Le directeur
- Triel as Le régisseur
- Marcel Mouloudji as Groom

== Bibliography ==
- Dayna Oscherwitz & MaryEllen Higgins. The A to Z of French Cinema. Scarecrow Press, 2009.
