= Odette (1934 film) =

- Directed by: Jacques Houssin; Giorgio Zambon
- Written by: Victorien Sardou (play); Benno Vigny; Giorgio Zambon
- Starring: Francesca Bertini; Samson Fainsilber; Jacques Maury
- Cinematography: Alberto G. Carta; René Gaveau; Joseph-Louis Mundwiller; Aldo Tonti
- Edited by: Francesco De Robertis
- Music by: Umberto Mancini
- Production company: Caesar Film
- Distributed by: Caesar Film
- Release date: 1934
- Running time: 70 minutes
- Country: Italy
- Language: Italian

Odette is a 1934 Italian drama film based upon the play by Victorien Sardou, directed by Jacques Houssin and Giorgio Zambon and starring Francesca Bertini, Samson Fainsilber, Jacques Maury. Bertini had appeared in two previous versions of the story, the first a 1916 silent film Odette.

== Cast ==
- Francesca Bertini as Odette
- Samson Fainsilber as Dario d'Alhucemas
- Jacques Maury as Philippe d'Armande
- Claude May as Jacqueline
- Yolanda Marcus as Sarah
- May Muriel as Mitza
- Léon Walther as Il conte Hubert de Clermont-Latour
- Henri Trévoux as Béchamel
- Maurice Maillot as Jean de Bordes
- Henri Fabert as Morizet

== Bibliography ==
- Goble, Alan. The Complete Index to Literary Sources in Film. Walter de Gruyter, 1999.
