= The Angel They Gave Me =

1946 film

- Directed by: Jean Choux
- Written by: Jean Charmat; Jean Choux; Françoise Giroud
- Produced by: Aimé Frapin
- Starring: Simone Renant; Jean Chevrier; Gabrielle Dorziat
- Cinematography: Marcel Grignon
- Edited by: Yvonne Martin
- Music by: René Sylviano
- Production company: Consortium du Film
- Distributed by: Consortium du Film
- Release date: 27 March 1946
- Running time: 90 minutes
- Country: France
- Language: French

The Angel They Gave Me (French: L'ange qu'on m'a donné) is a 1946 French drama film directed by Jean Choux and starring Simone Renant, Jean Chevrier and Gabrielle Dorziat. It was shot at the Boulogne Studios in Paris and on location around Vigny in the Val-d'Oise. The film's sets were designed by the art director Hugues Laurent.

== Synopsis ==
In 1940 during the German invasion and the fall of France, Claire finds an abandoned baby and brings him up. Five years later after the Allied victory, the boy's father who has been held as a prisoner of war and has now been released wants the child back. Claire manages to get herself hired as governess by the boy's grandmother the Countess de Cébrat at the family's country estate. She discovers the boy's real mother suffering from amnesia in a displaced persons camp and reunites the family, before removing herself from the scene with a heavy heart.

== Cast ==
- Simone Renant as Claire Girard
- Jean Chevrier as François Lemaresquier
- Gabrielle Dorziat as La comtesse de Cébrat
- Catherine Fonteney as Mme. Dubreuil - La directrice de la Croix-Rouge
- Michel Marsay as Jean Vernay
- Mady Berry as Nane
- Jean Wall as Jules
- Anne Laurens as Isabelle, l'amnésique
- Charles Vissières as L'aubergiste
- Albert Glado as Le petit Poum
- Charlotte Ecard
- Henri Charrett
- José Davilla
- Henri Coutet
- Maurice Marceau
- Paul Amiot

== Bibliography ==
- Burch, Noël & Sellier, Geneviève. The Battle of the Sexes in French Cinema, 1930–1956. Duke University Press, 2013.
- Rège, Philippe. Encyclopedia of French Film Directors, Volume 1. Scarecrow Press, 2009.
