= The Voice of Dreams =

1949 film

- Directed by: Jean-Paul Paulin
- Written by: Albert Husson; Jacques Maret; Pascal Paulin
- Based on: The Voice of Dreams by Jacques Maret
- Produced by: Jean-Paul Paulin
- Starring: Renée Saint-Cyr; Jean Chevrier; Marcello Pagliero
- Cinematography: Jean Bourgoin
- Edited by: Renée Guérin
- Music by: Georges Van Parys
- Production company: Francinalp
- Distributed by: Ciné Sélection
- Release date: 13 May 1949
- Running time: 94 minutes
- Country: France
- Language: French

The Voice of Dreams (French: La voix du rêve) is a 1949 French drama film directed by Jean-Paul Paulin and starring Renée Saint-Cyr, Jean Chevrier and Marcello Pagliero.

== Synopsis ==
During an accident, Laure lost her fiancée and was blinded. Her kindly sister Eve and Doctor Rameau conceal the loss of her lover by having Marcel, who has an identical voice, impersonate the man. But Marcel falls in love with Eve.

== Cast ==
- Renée Saint-Cyr as Eve
- Jean Chevrier as Le docteur Rameau
- Marcello Pagliero as Marcel
- Jeanne Fusier-Gir as Amélie
- Marina de Berg as Christne
- France Descaut as Laure

== Bibliography ==
- Oscherwitz, Dayna & Higgins, MaryEllen. The A to Z of French Cinema. Scarecrow Press, 2009.
- Rège, Philippe. Encyclopedia of French Film Directors, Volume 1. Scarecrow Press, 2009.
