= Pierre Nay =

- Born: 6 November 1898; Paris, France
- Died: 17 August 1978 (aged 79); Quimper, France
- Other name: Pierre Lucien Nonnes-Lopez
- Occupation: Actor
- Years active: 1928–1940 (film)

Pierre Nay (1898–1978) was a French film actor who appeared in 42 French films between 1928 and 1940.

== Selected filmography ==
- Le Roi des resquilleurs (1930)
- Venetian Nights (1931)
- 77 Rue Chalgrin (1931)
- Under the Leather Helmet (1932)
- The Tunnel (1933)
- The Concierge's Daughters (1934)
- Thirteen Days of Love (1935)
- The Call of Silence (1936)
- Port Arthur (1936)
- Ultimatum (1938)
- Rail Pirates (1938)
- Mirages (1938)
- The Rules of the Game (1939)

== Bibliography ==
- Jung, Uli & Schatzberg, Walter. Beyond Caligari: The Films of Robert Wiene. Berghahn Books, 1999.
