= Rothchild (film) =

1934 film

- Directed by: Marco de Gastyne
- Written by: Paul Laffitte (novel); Jean Guitton; E.R. Escalmel
- Produced by: E.R. Escalmel
- Starring: Harry Baur; Fred Pasquali; Paul Pauley
- Cinematography: Gaston Brun; Paul Parguel; Marius Roger
- Edited by: Jacques Tourneur
- Music by: Guido Curto
- Production company: Productions Escalmel
- Distributed by: Les Films Osso
- Release date: 4 May 1934
- Running time: 93 minutes
- Country: France
- Language: French

Rothchild is a 1934 French comedy film directed by Marco de Gastyne and starring Harry Baur, Fred Pasquali and Paul Pauley. It was remade as a 1935 British film The Guv'nor starring George Arliss.

The film's sets were designed by the art director Guy de Gastyne.

== Synopsis ==
Rothchild, a tramp, is assumed by a number of people to be a member of the famous banking family because of his surname.

== Cast ==
- Harry Baur as Rothchild
- Fred Pasquali as Flip
- Claudie Clèves as Madeleine
- Paul Pauley as Barsac
- Christian Casadesus as Marcel
- Germaine Michel as Mademoiselle Fallot
- Germaine Auger as Gaby Barsac
- Philippe Hériat as Diégo
- Georges Paulais as Marty
- Pierre Piérade as Fil de Fer
- Jean d'Yd as Le professeur

== Bibliography ==
- Cook, Pam. Gainsborough Pictures. Cassell, 1997.
- Fujiwara, Chris. Jacques Tourneur: The Cinema of Nightfall. McFarland, 1998.
