= Life Is a Bed of Roses =

- Theatrical release poster (artwork: Enki Bilal)
- Directed by: Alain Resnais
- Written by: Jean Gruault
- Produced by: Philippe Dussart
- Starring: Vittorio Gassman; Ruggero Raimondi; Fanny Ardant; Geraldine Chaplin; Pierre Arditi
- Cinematography: Bruno Nuytten
- Edited by: Albert Jurgenson
- Music by: Philippe-Gérard
- Distributed by: AAA-Soprofilms Distribution
- Release date: 20 April 1983 (France)
- Running time: 110 minutes
- Country: France
- Language: French
- Box office: $2.3 million

Life Is a Bed of Roses (French: La vie est un roman) is a 1983 French film directed by Alain Resnais from a screenplay by Jean Gruault. The English-language distribution title of the film is Life Is a Bed of Roses, though it has also been known as Forbek's Castle and Life Is a Fairy Tale. A literal translation of the original title is "Life is a novel [or story, romance]"; in the film the French quotation (or misquotation) is attributed to Napoleon.

== Plot ==
The film interweaves three stories from different eras but sharing a common location, in the forest of Ardennes.

In legendary times, the baby son of a king is rescued by his nurse when his father is killed by a rival. When the boy grows up, he kills a dragon, rescues a maiden, and reclaims his kingdom, to initiate a reign of love and happiness.

In 1914, the wealthy Count Forbek announces to his friends his plan to build an extravagant castle, a "temple of happiness", as a home for himself and for them, which he will dedicate to Livia, the woman he intends to marry. His plans are disrupted by the onset of the First World War, and Livia marries Raoul, an army officer; but in 1920 the castle is sufficiently complete for Forbek to entertain his friends there. He invites them all to participate in an experiment in which their present discontents and all their memories will be wiped away when they drink a potion, and they will be reborn as new people, re-educated to live in perfect harmony. Livia alone secretly avoids drinking the potion and observes its effect on the others. When she learns that Raoul has died in the experiment, she denounces Forbek's scheme, and he is devastated by her rejection.

In the 1980s, the castle has been converted into the Institut Holberg, a progressive school and teacher-training establishment. An educational conference brings together delegates who include Walter Guarini, a utopian architect, Nora Winkle, an American anthropologist, Elisabeth Rousseau, an earnest provincial schoolmistress, and Roger Dufresne, a games expert at the Institute. The determination of Georges Leroux, the conference convenor, to unite everyone in shared ideals of how the next generation should be educated is subverted when Elisabeth's demonstration of her practical method of integrated teaching provokes an outbreak of ideological disputes. Meanwhile, Nora's mischievous plan to foster a romance between Elisabeth and Roger has completely contrary results. The conference breaks up in disarray.

== Cast ==
- Vittorio Gassman as Walter Guarini
- Ruggero Raimondi as Michel Forbek
- Geraldine Chaplin as Nora Winkle
- Fanny Ardant as Livia Ceraskier
- Pierre Arditi as Robert Dufresne
- Sabine Azéma as Elisabeth Rousseau
- Robert Manuel as Georges Leroux
- Martine Kelly as Claudine Obertin
- Samson Fainsilber as Zoltan Forbek
- Véronique Silver as Nathalie Holberg
- André Dussollier as Raoul Vandamme
- Jean-Michel Dupuis as Laplaud
- Philippe Laudenbach as The educator
- Cathy Berberian as The nurse
- Francine Bergé as Young Lady
- Marie Rivière
- Chantal Ladesou

== Production ==
When the collaboration of Resnais and Jean Gruault on Mon oncle d'Amérique proved to be successful, the producer asked them to work on another film together. They developed an original scenario from their personal interests and enthusiasms into a three-tiered narrative which explored different attitudes towards happiness. Resnais's interest in 18th century British architecture and the extravagant projects of William Beckford provided the starting point for the section about Forbek and his castle.

Music was a significant element of the film. Resnais was eager to use an alternation of speaking and singing in the dialogue. The final scenes of the 1980s section with its shifting romantic coupling was modelled with The Marriage of Figaro in mind. The operatic dimension of the film was further emphasised by the casting of the bass Ruggero Raimondi in the role of Forbek (though he does not sing). The singer Cathy Berberian appeared in the legendary sequence, in the singing role of the old nurse which was one of her last performances; she died before the film was released.

To create distinct visual textures for different sections, different types of film stock were used: Eastmancolor for the 1920s section about Count Forbek, and Fujicolor for the 1980s episode of the educational conference.

For the fantasy scenes, the graphic artist Enki Bilal (who had previously designed the publicity poster for Mon oncle d'Amérique) created grotesque images of trees, plants and roots, painted on glass, which were placed in front of the camera to give an air of unreality to the filmed sets and landscapes.

For the exterior scenes of the castle, a château on the outskirts of Paris was used; the set designer Jacques Saulnier built a structure around it to give its extravagant aspects which were in a mixture of styles, including many oriental influences. This produced the effect described in the film as "une pâtisserie" ("a cake"). Interior scenes were filmed at the Studios de Boulogne.

== Reception ==
When the film was released in April 1983, it received many bad reviews: a critic for Le Monde called it a "catastrophe". It also drew the lowest-ever number of cinema admissions in France for a Resnais film to that date.

It was also coolly received by English-language critics when shown at film festivals. Some reviewers saw the film as a comic counterpart to its predecessor Mon oncle d'Amérique which had also used a triple narrative as the means of exploring theories of human behaviour; and both films were written by the same screenwriter, Jean Gruault. A rare positive reaction was stated in Sight & Sound: "After Mon oncle d'Amérique, which drew its multiple narratives from the forbidding stuff of the behavioural sciences, Resnais's latest collage seems quite frivolously based, intertwining fairy tale, comedy of manners and Feuillade-like fantasy. But the result is the same: a delicious celebration of imaginative possibility and narrative cunning".

Robert Benayoun, the critic and friend of Resnais, attributed the film's lack of success to the public's confusion when confronted with what appeared to be an overtly comic film from a director previously more associated with serious themes. Benayoun asserted however that this film "was made more than ever in the full likeness of Resnais: composite in style, baroque, intricate, built upon levels which are multiplied without restraint".
