= Simone Renant =

French actress

- Born: 19 March 1911; Amiens, France
- Died: 29 March 2004 (aged 93); Garches, France
- Occupation: Actress
- Years active: 1934–1983
- Spouses: Charles Gombault (m. 1933, divorced); Christian-Jaque (m. 1940; div. 1944); Alexandre Mnouchkine (m. 1975; died 1993)

Simone Renant (19 March 1911 – 29 March 2004) was a French film actress. She appeared in more than 40 films between 1934 and 1983. She was born in Amiens, France and died in Garches, France.

== Partial filmography ==
- La folle nuit (1932)
- Thirteen Days of Love (1935) - Marcelle
- You Can't Fool Antoinette (1936) - Antoinette
- School for Journalists (1936) - Simone Dubreuil
- The Mysterious Lady (1936) - La secrétaire
- L'ange du foyer (1937)
- The Pearls of the Crown (1937) - Madame Du Barry
- Rail Pirates (1938) - Marie Pierson
- They Were Twelve Women (1940) - Gaby
- Miss Bonaparte (1942) - Adèle Rémy
- The Duchess of Langeais (1942) - La vicomtesse Emilie de Fontaines
- Romance for Three (1942) - Huguette
- Love Letters (1942) - La préfète Hortense de la Jacquerie
- Domino (1943) - Laurette
- Voyage Without Hope (1943) - Marie-Ange
- La tentation de Barbizon (1946) - L'ange et Eva Parker / Angel
- The Angel They Gave Me (1946) - Claire Girard
- The Mysterious Monsieur Sylvain (1947) - Françoise Dastier
- Quai des Orfèvres (1947) - Dora Monier
- After Love (1947) - Nicole Mésaule
- The Cupid Club (1949) - Isabelle
- No Pity for Women (1950) - Marianne Séverin
- The Happy Man (1950) - Madeleine Jolivet
- Tapage nocturne (1951) - Marie Varescot
- Son of the Hunchback (1952) - Mathilde Pérolle
- The Night Is Ours (1953) - Françoise Clozat
- Stopover in Orly (1955) - Gloria Morena
- Bedevilled (1955) - Francesca
- If Paris Were Told to Us (1956) - Marquise de V...
- The Ostrich Has Two Eggs (1957) - Thérèse Barjus
- Not Delivered (1958) - Denise Giraucourt
- The Adventures of Remi (1958) - Lady Mary Milligan
- Women Are Weak (1959) - Marguerite Maroni, Helene's mother
- Les liaisons dangereuses (1959) - Mme Volanges
- Love and the Frenchwoman (1960) - Desire's advocate (segment "Femme seule, La")
- Vive Henri IV... vive l'amour! (1961) - Charlotte de Trémoille
- Cadavres en vacances (1963) - L'hôtelière
- That Man from Rio (1964) - Lola, Cabaret Singer
- Love Is a Funny Thing (1969) - Françoise's friend - cameo appearance
- Dear Inspector (1977) - Suzanne
- Three Men to Kill (1980) - Mme. Gerfaut
