= You Can't Fool Antoinette =

1936 film

- Directed by: Paul Madeux
- Written by: Madeleine Bussy; Maurice Hennequin (play); Pierre Veber (play); Henri Vendresse
- Produced by: Henri Ullmann
- Starring: Armand Bernard; Paul Pauley; Simone Renant
- Cinematography: Boris Kaufman
- Music by: Casimir Oberfeld
- Distributed by: Paramount Pictures
- Release date: 20 May 1936
- Running time: 77 minutes
- Country: France
- Language: French

You Can't Fool Antoinette (French: On ne roule pas Antoinette) is a 1936 French comedy film directed by Paul Madeux and starring Armand Bernard, Paul Pauley and Simone Renant. The film's sets were designed by the art directors Henri Ménessier and René Renoux.

== Cast ==
- Armand Bernard as Hubert de Prémaillac
- Paul Pauley as Le marquis de la Tour-Barrée
- Simone Renant as Antoinette
- Pierre Stéphen as Stanislas de Varini
- Alice Tissot as La marquise de la Tour-Barrée
- Saint-Granier as Lepitois
- Charles Lemontier as Le domestique
- Suzy Leroy
- Rogers

== Bibliography ==
- Goble, Alan. The Complete Index to Literary Sources in Film. Walter de Gruyter, 1999.
