= Marie-Martine =

1943 film

- Directed by: Albert Valentin
- Written by: Jean Anouilh; Jacques Viot
- Produced by: François Chavane
- Starring: Renée Saint-Cyr; Jules Berry; Saturnin Fabre
- Cinematography: Jean Isnard
- Edited by: Raymond Lamy
- Music by: Georges Van Parys
- Production company: Éclair-Journal
- Distributed by: Éclair-Journal
- Release date: 11 May 1943
- Running time: 103 minutes
- Country: France
- Language: French

Marie-Martine is a 1943 French drama film directed by Albert Valentin and starring Renée Saint-Cyr, Jules Berry and Saturnin Fabre. It was shot at the Photosonor Studios in Paris. The film's sets were designed by the art director Jean Perrier.

== Synopsis ==
Just released from prison after a false accusation of murder, Marie-Martine attempts to rebuild her life. However her hopes to get married are threatened by a blackmailing novelist.

== Cast ==
- Renée Saint-Cyr as Marie-Martine
- Jules Berry as Le romancier Loïc Limousin
- Saturnin Fabre as L'oncle Parpain
- Bernard Blier as Maurice
- Marguerite Deval as Mademoiselle Aimée
- Jeanne Fusier-Gir as Mademoiselle Crémier
- Sylvie as La mère de Maurice
- Héléna Manson as Madame Limousin
- Jean Debucourt as Monsieur de Lachaume
- Michel Marsay as Philippe Ponthieu
- Frédéric Mariotti as Ernest - le garçon de café
- Hélène Constant as Hélène

== Bibliography ==
- Bertin-Maghit, Jean Pierre. Le cinéma français sous Vichy: les films français de 1940 à 1944. Revue du Cinéma Albatros, 1980.
