= The Woman with Closed Eyes =

1926 film directed by Alexandre Ryder

- Directed by: Alexandre Ryder
- Written by: Pierre L'Ermite (novel)
- Starring: Marise Maia; Jean Lorette; Pierre Stéphen
- Cinematography: Marcel Lucien
- Production company: Iris-Film
- Release date: 1 March 1926
- Running time: 73 minutes
- Country: France
- Languages: Silent; French intertitles

The Woman with Closed Eyes (French: La femme aux yeux fermés) is a 1926 French silent drama film directed by Alexandre Ryder and starring Marise Maia, Jean Lorette and Pierre Stéphen.

== Cast ==
- Marise Maia as Roselyne de Crécy
- Jean Lorette as Le chauffeur
- Mme. de Rodde as Madame Hugues
- Pierre Stéphen as Le jeune homme
- Nicolas Martin as Le père du jeune homme
- Nicolas Redelsperger as Monsieur Hugues

== Bibliography ==
- Rège, Philippe. Encyclopedia of French Film Directors, Volume 1. Scarecrow Press, 2009.
