= A Connecticut Yankee (film) =

1931 film

- Theatrical release poster
- Directed by: David Butler
- Written by: William Conselman; Owen Davis; Jack Moffitt
- Based on: A Connecticut Yankee in King Arthur's Court by Mark Twain
- Produced by: William Fox
- Starring: Will Rogers; William Farnum; Maureen O'Sullivan; Myrna Loy
- Cinematography: Ernest Palmer
- Edited by: Irene Morra
- Music by: Arthur Kay
- Color process: Black and white
- Production company: Fox Film Corporation
- Distributed by: Fox Film Corporation
- Release date: April 6, 1931
- Running time: 95 minutes
- Country: United States
- Language: English
- Box office: $1.2 million

A Connecticut Yankee is a 1931 American pre-Code fantasy comedy film adaptation of Mark Twain's 1889 novel, A Connecticut Yankee in King Arthur's Court. It was directed by David Butler to a script by William M. Conselman, Owen Davis, and Jack Moffitt. It was produced by Fox Film Corporation (later 20th Century Fox), who had earlier produced the 1921 silent adaptation of the novel, A Connecticut Yankee in King Arthur's Court. A Connecticut Yankee is the first sound film adaptation of Twain's novel. It is unrelated to the 1927 musical also titled A Connecticut Yankee.

As in The Wizard of Oz, many of the actors in the film play more than one role, a character in the real world and one in the dream world. The film stars Will Rogers as Hank Martin, an American accidental time traveler who finds himself in Camelot back in the days of King Arthur (William Farnum, a Fox star for many years). Myrna Loy and Brandon Hurst play the evil Morgan le Fay and Merlin, who must be overcome by Hank's modern technical knowledge, while Maureen O'Sullivan plays Alisande.

The hero's name was changed from Hank Morgan to Hank Martin, possibly because the original name sounded too similar to that of actor Frank Morgan.

A trailer for the film exists at the Library of Congress.

== Plot ==
Radio salesman Hank Martin, after being knocked out by a toppled suit of armor, travels back in time to Camelot where he is welcomed by King Arthur and must use his modern knowledge to stop Morgana Le Fay and Merlin from taking over.

== Cast ==
- Will Rogers as Hank Martin
- William Farnum as King Arthur/Inventor
- Frank Albertson as Emile le Poulet/Clarence
- Maureen O'Sullivan as Alisande/Woman in Mansion
- Brandon Hurst as Merlin/Doctor in Mansion
- Myrna Loy as Morgana Le Fay/Evil Sister in Mansion
- Mitchell Harris as Sagramor/Butler in Mansion
- Heinie Conklin as Sneezing Man (uncredited)

== Production ==
Fox was likely inspired to produce A Connecticut Yankee based on the success of the 1921 silent film. The 1931 version was likewise successful, and was re-released in 1936. The film cost $750,000 to make; the production used 174 Austin automobiles, among other pieces of modern machinery, to make the final battle scene. It was a commercial success despite being released during the Depression.

Although the film was released in black and white, director David Butler used progressively darker shades of pink tint to emphasize a scene in which Morgana Le Fay flirts with Hank Martin.

== See also ==
- 1931 in science fiction
