= End of the World (1931 film) =

1931 French science fiction film

- Quad poster under original French title
- Directed by: Abel Gance
- Written by: Jean Boyer; Camille Flammarion; Abel Gance; André Lang
- Produced by: K. Ivanoff
- Starring: Victor Francen; Colette Darfeuil; Abel Gance; Jeanne Brindeau; Samson Fainsilber
- Cinematography: Nicolas Rudakov; Jules Kruger; Roger Hubert
- Edited by: Mme. Bruyere
- Release date: 23 January 1931
- Running time: 105 minutes
- Country: France
- Language: French

End of the World (French: La Fin du monde) is a 1931 French science fiction film directed by Abel Gance based on the novel Omega: The Last Days of the World by Camille Flammarion. The film stars Victor Francen as Martial Novalic, Colette Darfeuil as Genevieve de Murcie, Abel Gance as Jean Novalic, and Jeanne Brindeau as Madame Novalic.

The plot concerns a comet hurtling toward Earth on a collision course and the different reactions of people to the impending disaster. The scientist Martial Novalic, who discovers the comet, seeks a solution to the problem and becomes a fugitive after skeptical authorities blame him for starting a mass panic.

It was director Abel Gance's first sound film. The original film was to be over three hours long, but the backing production took the film from Gance and cut it to be 105 minutes. It was again cut on its release in the United States under the title of Paris after Dark. Neither abridged version of the film was well received by audiences or critics.

== Plot ==
Jean Novalic plays Jesus Christ in a passion play. Isabelle Bolin attends with her boyfriend, the stock promoter Schomburg, who is entranced by the blonde actress playing Mary Magdalene, Genevieve de Murcie. Genevieve defies her scientist father Monsieur de Murcie to propose to Jean, who tells her that they cannot marry. Back home, Genevieve's father, jealous of fame of the wealthy Martial Novalic, accepts money from Schomburg to build an observatory better than Novalic's. Schomburg then announces his intention to court de Murcie's daughter.

As Jean aids a young woman being abused, he is accused of rape and is critically wounded by a blow to the head. Schomburg accompanies Genevieve to a fancy party, but takes her back to her apartment and rapes her. In his observatory, Martial determines that Lexell's Comet is on a collision course with Earth. Jean predicts a coming apocalypse and claims that the cataclysm has arrived to "save the hearts of man". Martial confides to his colleagues that the comet will strike in 114 days. After Jean is taken to an asylum, Martial and Genevieve listen to his phonographs, which instruct Genevieve to abandon her worldly life and help Martial inaugurate a new world government. Jean's voice tells them they must marry and become the shepherd and shepherdess of humanity. Genevieve sees a vision of Jean as Christ.

With 92 days left, Schomburg invests heavily in armaments, while Martial goes to the rich Werster and tells him that the world will end. Werster deals with Schomburg and gives Martial money to buy a newspaper and a broadcast station. Genevieve has remained single but helps to organize Radio Martial Novalic's broadcasts of peace bulletins. Martial's confederates jam official radio news that have warnings that war mobilization is imminent. Martial announces the coming end of the world. Stock markets plunge around the globe, but Schomburg continues to buy. De Murcie and Schomburg accuse Novalic of kidnapping Genevieve and using the comet as a hoax to destroy the economy. A government minister orders the closure of the exchanges and the arrest of Martial and Werster. However, Martial's agents learn of the arrest warrant with a hidden microphone. The newspaper is confiscated and the radio station destroyed, but Martial and Werster escape.

The government hides the truth, which allows the stock markets to recover. Schomberg holds a party the very night that Martial claims that the comet will become visible. Schomberg tells gangsters that he will pay a million francs if Martial and Werster are found dead before morning. Genevieve returns to her father and joins Schomburg in the garden; the jealous Isabelle runs to warn Martial Novalic. At the party, the comet comes into sight. Isabelle helps Martial escape and learns that war mobilization will soon be announced. He and Werster rush to destroy the government's radio antenna in the Eiffel Tower. Genevieve tips off Martial by telephone that Schomburg and his killers are ascending in an elevator. Werster warns Genevieve to stay on the ground and uses a cutting torch to sever the elevator cable, but Genevieve had taken the elevator as well and is killed with the rest.

The entire world can now see Lexell's Comet, and Radio Novalic resumes broadcasting. Martial calls for the first convention of the "General States of the Universe" on 5 August, the night before the collision. People around the world begin to pray as the comet looms larger in the sky, and extreme weather ensues, including blizzards, storms, tidal waves. Riots break out and a thousand revelers bring musicians into a great hall for a feast and orgy. Monks carrying candles interrupt the orgy and lead the group in prayer. As the orbits of the comet and the Earth converge, Martial Novalic addresses the One World Congress, which unanimously agrees to unite all governments into a single harmonious entity. The comet narrowly misses the Earth. Much of the world has been reduced to rubble, but life will go on.

== Production ==
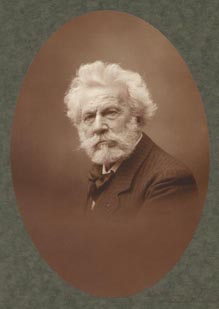
The film is based on a novel by Camille Flammarion

Director Abel Gance had meditated on the idea of End of the World since 1913. After he created the film Napoleon in 1927, he convinced himself and backers to go forward with the project. Gance originally was going to title the film The End of the World, as Seen, Heard and Rendered, by Abel Gance. Filming began in mid-1929 and was finished roughly a year later.

The film had been edited to a running time of just over three hours. When the backers felt that the film was becoming far too long, they took production control away from Gance and cut the film to 105 minutes.

It was shot at the Joinville Studios in Paris.

== Cast ==
- Abel Gance as Jean Novalic
- Colette Darfeuil as Genevieve de Murcie
- Sylvie Gance as Isabelle Bolin (as Sylvie Grenade)
- Jeanne Brindeau as Mme. Novalic
- Samson Fainsilber as Schomburg
- Georges Colin as Werster
- Jean d'Yd as M. de Murcie
- Victor Francen as Martial Novalic

== Release ==
The film was released in France in January 1931 under the title La Fin du monde at a rough length of 105 minutes and was never shown in the United States in this form. Although the American director Cecil B. DeMille showed interest in purchasing the rights to the film, it was released in 1934 by American film distributor Harold Auten who trimmed the running time to 54 minutes in the fashion of various exploitation films of the time.

Auten's version was retitled Paris After Dark and included a new opening by Dr. Clyde Fisher discussing the scientific nature of the film. The film removed most of the film's dialogue filling it with title cards and made the leading character Jean Novalic into a minor character, with only a few scenes in the background.

== Reception ==
The film received a disastrous reception from audiences and critics alike. The contemporary critic Philippe Soupault described it as "portentously naive" and "blatantly unrealistic". Gance himself referred to the film as "an abortive work" ruined by the producer taking the film away from him so he could edit it himself.

The lack of success of End of the World forced Gance to turn to more conventional subject matter in order to continue working as a filmmaker.

== See also ==
- 1931 in science fiction
- Warning from Space - a 1956 Japanese film potentially influenced by End of the World
