= 1937 in film =

The year 1937 in film involved some significant events, including the Walt Disney production of the first American full-length animated film, Snow White and the Seven Dwarfs. Jean Harlow's final movie, Saratoga, was domestically the year's top grossing film but internationally, Maytime surpassed it with initial box office of over 4 million dollars.

== Events ==
- March 26 – London Films abandons production of I, Claudius two weeks after its female lead, Merle Oberon, is injured in a car crash.
- April 16 – Laurel and Hardy comedy Way Out West premieres in the US.
- May 7 – Fred Astaire and Ginger Rogers musical comedy Shall We Dance premieres in the US.
- May 11 – Drama Captains Courageous, starring Spencer Tracy, premieres in New York, going into general release on June 25.
- June 7 – Jean Harlow, one of the biggest Hollywood stars of the decade, dies aged 26 at Good Samaritan Hospital, Los Angeles. The official cause of death is listed as cerebral edema, a complication of kidney failure.
- June 11 – Marx Brothers comedy A Day at the Races premieres in the U.S.
- July 9 – The silent film archives of Fox Film Corporation are destroyed by the 1937 Fox vault fire.
- July 23 – Six weeks after Jean Harlow's death, her final film, Saratoga, is released. It is an instant box office success and becomes the year's highest-grossing film, as well as the highest-grossing film of her career.
- September 20 - Japan's Ministry of Finance sanctions the United States by placing restrictions on the transfer of Hollywood box office revenues from Japan to the United States.
- December 21 – Walt Disney's debut feature film Snow White and the Seven Dwarfs, the first feature-length cartoon to be made in America, in Technicolor, and in sound, premieres at the Carthay Circle Theatre in Los Angeles. The film opens nationwide on February 4, 1938, and is a massive box office success, briefly holding the record as the highest-grossing sound film of all time.
- Monogram Pictures, who had merged with Republic Pictures two years earlier, decide to separate and distribute their own films again.

== Academy Awards ==
- Best Picture: The Life of Emile Zola – Warner Bros.
- Best Director: Leo McCarey – The Awful Truth
- Best Actor: Spencer Tracy – Captains Courageous
- Best Actress: Luise Rainer – The Good Earth
- Best Supporting Actor: Joseph Schildkraut – The Life of Emile Zola
- Best Supporting Actress: Alice Brady – In Old Chicago

== Top-grossing films (U.S.) ==
The top ten 1937 released films by box office gross in North America are as follows:

Highest-grossing films of 1937
Rank	Title	Distributor	Domestic rentals
1	Saratoga	MGM	$2,432,000
2	Maytime	MGM	$2,183,000
3	The Good Earth	MGM	$2,002,000
4	Stella Dallas	United Artists	$2,000,000
5	Rosalie	MGM	$1,946,000
6	Broadway Melody of 1938	MGM	$1,889,000
7	Captains Courageous	MGM	$1,688,000
8	Lost Horizon	Columbia	$1,683,000
9	A Day at the Races	MGM	$1,602,000
10	Thin Ice	20th Century Fox	$1,590,000

== Top ten money-making stars ==
Rank	Actor/Actress
1.	Shirley Temple
2.	Clark Gable
3.	Robert Taylor
4.	Bing Crosby
5.	William Powell
6.	Jane Withers
7. (tie)	Fred Astaire; Ginger Rogers
8.	Sonja Henie
9.	Gary Cooper
10.	Myrna Loy

== Notable films ==
United States unless stated.

=== # ===
- 100 Men and a Girl, directed by Henry Koster, starring Deanna Durbin, Leopold Stokowski and Adolphe Menjou

=== A ===
- The Academy Award Review of Walt Disney Cartoons
- Action for Slander, directed by Tim Whelan, starring Clive Brook and Ann Todd – (GB)
- Ali Baba Goes to Town, directed by David Butler, starring Eddie Cantor and Tony Martin
- Andula Won (Andula vyhrála), directed by Miroslav Cikán, starring Věra Ferbasová – (Czechoslovakia)
- Angel, directed by Ernst Lubitsch, starring Marlene Dietrich, Herbert Marshall and Melvyn Douglas
- Annapolis Salute, directed by Christy Cabanne, starring James Ellison, Marsha Hunt, Harry Carey and Van Heflin
- Artists and Models, directed by Raoul Walsh, starring Jack Benny, Ida Lupino and Richard Arlen
- The Awful Truth, directed by Leo McCarey, starring Irene Dunne, Cary Grant and Ralph Bellamy

=== B ===
- Battle of Greed, directed by Howard Higgin, starring Tom Keene
- Bezhin Meadow, directed by Sergei Eisenstein – (USSR)
- Big City, directed by Frank Borzage, starring Luise Rainer and Spencer Tracy
- Bizarre, Bizarre (Drôle de drame), directed by Marcel Carné, starring Louis Jouvet and Michel Simon – (France)
- Black Legion, directed by Archie Mayo, starring Humphrey Bogart and Ann Sheridan
- Born to the West, directed by Charles Barton, starring John Wayne, Marsha Hunt and John Mack Brown
- The Bride Wore Red, directed by Dorothy Arzner, starring Joan Crawford, Franchot Tone, Robert Young and Billie Burke
- Brief Ecstasy, directed by Edmond T. Gréville, starring Paul Lukas – (GB)
- Broadway Melody of 1938, directed by Roy Del Ruth, starring Robert Taylor, Eleanor Powell and Judy Garland
- Bulldog Drummond's Revenge, directed by Louis King, starring John Barrymore and John Howard

=== C ===
- Captains Courageous, directed by Victor Fleming, starring Freddie Bartholomew, Spencer Tracy, Lionel Barrymore and Melvyn Douglas
- Charlie Chan at the Olympics, directed by H. Bruce Humberstone, starring Warner Oland
- Confession, directed by Joe May, starring Kay Francis and Basil Rathbone
- Conquest, directed by Clarence Brown, starring Greta Garbo and Charles Boyer
- Crossroads (Shízì jiētóu), directed by Shen Xiling, starring Bai Yang and Zhao Dan – (China)

=== D ===
- A Damsel in Distress, directed by George Stevens, starring Fred Astaire, George Burns, Gracie Allen and Joan Fontaine
- Daughter of Shanghai, directed by Robert Florey, starring Anna May Wong, Philip Ahn and Charles Bickford
- The Daughter of the Samurai (Die Tochter des Samurai / Atarashiki tsuchi), directed by Arnold Fanck and Mansaku Itami, starring Setsuko Hara and Sessue Hayakawa – (Germany/Japan)
- A Day at the Races, directed by Sam Wood, starring the Marx Brothers, Allan Jones and Maureen O'Sullivan
- Dead End, directed by William Wyler, starring Sylvia Sidney, Joel McCrea, Humphrey Bogart and Claire Trevor
- Double Wedding, directed by Richard Thorpe, starring William Powell and Myrna Loy
- Dreaming Lips, directed by Paul Czinner, starring Elisabeth Bergner and Raymond Massey – (GB)
- Duniya Na Mane (Kunku / The Unexpected), directed by V. Shantaram, starring Shanta Apte – (India)
- The Dybbuk (Der Dibuk), directed by Michał Waszyński – (Poland)

=== E ===
- Easy Living, directed by Mitchell Leisen, starring Jean Arthur, Edward Arnold and Ray Milland
- The Edge of the World, directed by Michael Powell – (GB)
- Elephant Boy, directed by Robert J. Flaherty and Zoltan Korda, starring Sabu – (GB)
- España 1936, a documentary directed by Jean-Paul Le Chanois, produced and co-written by Luis Buñuel – (Spain)
- Ever Since Eve, directed by Lloyd Bacon, starring Marion Davies and Robert Montgomery

=== F ===
- A Family Affair, directed by George B. Seitz, starring Lionel Barrymore, Cecilia Parker and Mickey Rooney
- Fire Over England, directed by William K. Howard, starring Flora Robson, Laurence Olivier, Vivien Leigh and Raymond Massey – (GB)
- The Firefly, directed by Robert Z. Leonard, starring Jeanette MacDonald, Allan Jones and Warren William
- First Lady, directed by Stanley Logan, starring Kay Francis and Preston Foster

=== G ===
- Gangway, directed by Sonnie Hale, starring Jessie Matthews – (GB)
- Girl Loves Boy, directed by W. Duncan Mansfield, starring Eric Linden and Cecilia Parker
- The Good Earth, directed by Sidney Franklin, starring Paul Muni and Luise Rainer
- Good Morning, Boys, directed by Marcel Varnel, starring Will Hay and Graham Moffatt – (GB)
- La Grande Illusion (The Grand Illusion), directed by Jean Renoir, starring Jean Gabin, Dita Parlo and Erich von Stroheim – (France)
- The Great Barrier, directed by Milton Rosmer and Geoffrey Barkas, starring Richard Arlen and Lilli Palmer – (GB)
- The Great Garrick, directed by James Whale, starring Brian Aherne and Olivia de Havilland
- The Great O'Malley, directed by William Dieterle, starring Pat O'Brien, Humphrey Bogart and Ann Sheridan
- Green Fields, directed by Jacob Ben-Ami and Edgar G. Ulmer
- Gribouille (The Meddler), directed by Marc Allégret, starring Raimu and Michèle Morgan – (France)

=== H ===
- La Habanera, directed by Douglas Sirk, starring Zarah Leander – (Germany)
- Head Over Heels, directed by Sonnie Hale, starring Jessie Matthews – (GB)
- Heidi, directed by Allan Dwan, starring Shirley Temple and Jean Hersholt
- High, Wide, and Handsome, directed by Rouben Mamoulian, starring Irene Dunne and Randolph Scott
- History is Made at Night, directed by Frank Borzage, starring Charles Boyer and Jean Arthur
- The Hound of the Baskervilles (Der Hund von Baskerville), directed by Karel Lamač – (Germany)
- Humanity and Paper Balloons (Ninjō kami fūsen), directed by Sadao Yamanaka – (Japan)
- The Hurricane, directed by John Ford, starring Dorothy Lamour, Mary Astor, Raymond Massey and John Carradine

=== I ===
- It Happened in Hollywood, directed by Harry Lachman, starring Richard Dix and Fay Wray
- It's Love I'm After, directed by Archie Mayo, starring Leslie Howard, Bette Davis and Olivia de Havilland

=== J ===
- Jump for Glory, directed by Raoul Walsh, starring Douglas Fairbanks Jr. and Valerie Hobson – (GB)

=== K ===
- Kid Galahad, directed by Michael Curtiz, starring Edward G. Robinson, Bette Davis and Humphrey Bogart
- King Solomon's Mines, directed by Robert Stevenson, starring Cedric Hardwicke and Paul Robeson – (GB)
- Knight Without Armour, directed by Jacques Feyder, starring Marlene Dietrich and Robert Donat – (GB)

=== L ===
- Lancashire Luck, directed by Henry Cass, starring Wendy Hiller – (GB)
- The Last Gangster, directed by Edward Ludwig, starring Edward G. Robinson and James Stewart
- The Last of Mrs. Cheyney, directed by Richard Boleslawski, starring Joan Crawford, William Powell, Robert Montgomery and Frank Morgan
- Law for Tombstone, directed by and starring Buck Jones
- Layla and Majnun (Leyli va Majnun), directed by Abdolhossein Sepanta – (Iran)
- The Life of Emile Zola, directed by William Dieterle, starring Paul Muni
- Lost Horizon, directed by Frank Capra, starring Ronald Colman and Jane Wyatt
- Love from a Stranger, directed by Rowland V. Lee, starring Ann Harding and Basil Rathbone – (GB)
- Love Is on the Air, directed by Nick Grinde, starring Ronald Reagan and June Travis

=== M ===
- Madame X, directed by Sam Wood, starring Gladys George and Warren William
- Maid of Salem, directed by Frank Lloyd, starring Claudette Colbert and Fred MacMurray
- Make Way for Tomorrow, directed by Leo McCarey, starring Victor Moore and Beulah Bondi
- The Man Who Could Work Miracles, directed by Lothar Mendes, starring Roland Young and Ralph Richardson – (GB)
- The Man Who Was Sherlock Holmes (Der Mann, der Sherlock Holmes war), directed by Karl Hartl, starring Hans Albers and Heinz Rühmann – (Germany)
- Marked Woman, directed by Lloyd Bacon, starring Bette Davis and Humphrey Bogart
- Maytime, directed by Robert Z. Leonard, starring Jeanette MacDonald, Nelson Eddy and John Barrymore
- Morality Above All Else (Mravnost nade vše), directed by Martin Frič, starring Hugo Haas – (Czechoslovakia)

=== N ===
- Nancy Steele Is Missing, directed by George Marshall and Otto Preminger, starring Victor McLaglen and Peter Lorre
- Navy Blue and Gold, directed by Sam Wood, starring James Stewart, Robert Young and Lionel Barrymore
- Night Must Fall, directed by Richard Thorpe, starring Robert Montgomery and Rosalind Russell
- Nothing Sacred, directed by William A. Wellman, starring Carole Lombard and Fredric March

=== O ===
- O-Kay for Sound, directed by Marcel Varnel, starring the Crazy Gang – (GB)
- Oh, Mr Porter!, directed by Marcel Varnel, starring Will Hay, Moore Marriott and Graham Moffatt – (GB)
- The Old Mill, a Silly Symphonies cartoon directed by Wilfred Jackson
- On the Avenue, directed by Roy Del Ruth, starring Dick Powell, Madeleine Carroll and Alice Faye

=== P ===
- Parnell, directed by John M. Stahl, starring Clark Gable and Myrna Loy
- Pépé le Moko, directed by Julien Duvivier, starring Jean Gabin – (France)
- The Perfect Specimen, directed by Michael Curtiz, starring Errol Flynn and Joan Blondell
- Pick a Star, directed by Edward Sedgwick, starring Patsy Kelly and Jack Haley
- Popeye the Sailor Meets Ali Baba's Forty Thieves, directed by Dave Fleischer, starring Jack Mercer
- The Prince and the Pauper, directed by William Keighley, starring Errol Flynn and Claude Rains
- The Prisoner of Zenda, directed by John Cromwell, starring Ronald Colman, Madeleine Carroll, Douglas Fairbanks Jr., Raymond Massey, Mary Astor and David Niven

=== Q ===
- Quality Street, directed by George Stevens, starring Katharine Hepburn and Franchot Tone

=== R ===
- The Road Back, directed by James Whale
- Rosalie, directed by W. S. Van Dyke, starring Nelson Eddy, Eleanor Powell and Frank Morgan

=== S ===
- Saratoga, directed by Jack Conway, starring Clark Gable, Jean Harlow, Lionel Barrymore, Frank Morgan, Walter Pidgeon and Una Merkel
- The Seven Ravens (Die sieben Raben), directed by the Diehl Brothers – (Germany)
- Seventh Heaven, directed by Henry King, starring Simone Simon and James Stewart
- Shall We Dance, directed by Mark Sandrich, starring Fred Astaire and Ginger Rogers
- Il signor Max (Mr. Max), directed by Mario Camerini, starring Vittorio De Sica – (Italy)
- Silver Blaze (US: Murder at the Baskervilles), directed by Thomas Bentley, starring Arthur Wontner and Ian Fleming – (GB)
- Skeleton on Horseback (Bílá nemoc), directed by and starring Hugo Haas – (Czechoslovakia)
- Slave Ship, directed by Tay Garnett, starring Warner Baxter, Wallace Beery and Mickey Rooney
- Slim, directed by Ray Enright, starring Pat O'Brien and Henry Fonda
- Snow White and the Seven Dwarfs, animated film directed by David Hand, with the voice of Adriana Caselotti
- The Soldier and the Lady, directed by George Nicholls Jr., starring Anton Walbrook and Elizabeth Allan
- Something to Sing About, directed by Victor Schertzinger, starring James Cagney and William Frawley
- Song at Midnight (Yèbàn gēshēng), directed by Ma-Xu Weibang, starring Jin Shan – (China)
- Souls at Sea, directed by Henry Hathaway, starring Gary Cooper and George Raft
- Stage Door, directed by Gregory La Cava, starring Katharine Hepburn, Ginger Rogers and Adolphe Menjou
- Stand-In, directed by Tay Garnett, starring Leslie Howard, Joan Blondell and Humphrey Bogart
- A Star Is Born, directed by William A. Wellman, starring Janet Gaynor, Fredric March and Adolphe Menjou
- Stella Dallas, directed by King Vidor, starring Barbara Stanwyck and John Boles
- Storm in a Teacup, directed by Ian Dalrymple and Victor Saville, starring Vivien Leigh and Rex Harrison – (GB)
- Street Angel (Mǎlù tiānshǐ), directed by Yuan Muzhi, starring Zhou Xuan – (China)

=== T ===
- The Tale of the Fox (Le Roman de Renard), directed by Ladislas Starevich – (France)
- That Certain Woman, directed by Edmund Goulding, starring Bette Davis and Henry Fonda
- They Gave Him a Gun, directed by W. S. Van Dyke, starring Spencer Tracy, Gladys George and Franchot Tone
- They Won't Forget, directed by Mervyn LeRoy, starring Claude Rains
- Thin Ice, directed by Sidney Lanfield, starring Sonja Henie and Tyrone Power
- Think Fast, Mr. Moto, directed by Norman Foster, starring Peter Lorre
- This Is My Affair, directed by William A. Seiter, starring Robert Taylor, Barbara Stanwyck and Victor McLaglen
- The Three Garridebs, directed by Eustace Wyatt, starring Louis Hector
- Thunder in the City, directed by Marion Gering, starring Edward G. Robinson and Nigel Bruce – (GB)
- To New Shores (Zu neuen Ufern), directed by Douglas Sirk, starring Zarah Leander – (Germany)
- Topper, directed by Norman Z. McLeod, starring Constance Bennett, Cary Grant, Roland Young and Billie Burke
- Tovarich, directed by Anatole Litvak, starring Claudette Colbert, Charles Boyer and Basil Rathbone
- Tři vejce do skla (Three Eggs in a Glass), directed by Martin Frič – (Czechoslovakia)
- True Confession, directed by Wesley Ruggles, starring Carole Lombard, Fred MacMurray, John Barrymore and Una Merkel

=== V ===
- The Vicar of Bray, directed by Henry Edwards, starring Stanley Holloway – (GB)
- Victoria the Great, directed by Herbert Wilcox, starring Anna Neagle and Anton Walbrook – (GB)

=== W ===
- Way Out West, directed by James W. Horne, starring Laurel and Hardy
- Wee Willie Winkie, directed by John Ford, starring Shirley Temple, Victor McLaglen and Cesar Romero
- Wells Fargo, directed by Frank Lloyd, starring Joel McCrea
- What Did the Lady Forget? (Shukujo wa nani wo wasureta ka), directed by Yasujirō Ozu – (Japan)
- Wise Girl, directed by Leigh Jason, starring Miriam Hopkins and Ray Milland
- Without a Dowry (Bespridannitsa), directed by Yakov Protazanov – (USSR)
- Woman Chases Man, directed by John G. Blystone, starring Miriam Hopkins and Joel McCrea
- The Woman I Love, directed by Anatole Litvak, starring Paul Muni and Miriam Hopkins

=== Y ===
- Yoshiwara, directed by Max Ophüls, starring Sessue Hayakawa – (France)
- You Can't Have Everything, directed by Norman Taurog, starring Alice Faye and Don Ameche
- You Only Live Once, directed by Fritz Lang, starring Sylvia Sidney and Henry Fonda
- Young and Innocent, directed by Alfred Hitchcock, starring Nova Pilbeam and Derrick De Marney – (GB)
- You're a Sweetheart, directed by David Butler, starring Alice Faye
- You're Only Young Once, directed by George B. Seitz, starring Lewis Stone, Cecilia Parker, Mickey Rooney and Fay Holden

=== Z ===
- Znachor (The Quack), directed by Michał Waszyński – (Poland)

== 1937 film releases ==
=== January–March ===
- January 1937
  - 13 January
    - Thunder in the City (GB)
  - 14 January
    - Action for Slander
  - 17 January
    - Battle of Greed
  - 26 January
    - Without Dowry (U.S.S.R.)
  - 28 January
    - Pépé le Moko (France)
  - 29 January
    - The Good Earth
    - You Only Live Once
  - 30 January
    - Black Legion
- February 1937
  - 2 February
    - Dreaming Lips (Britain)
  - 4 February
    - The Daughter of the Samurai (Germany/Japan)
  - 12 February
    - Head Over Heels (GB)
    - On the Avenue
  - 13 February
    - The Great O'Malley
  - 19 February
    - The Last of Mrs. Cheyney
- March 1937
  - 2 March
    - Lost Horizon
  - 3 March
    - Maid of Salem
  - 5 March
    - Fire Over England (GB)
    - History is Made at Night
    - Jump for Glory (GB)
  - 12 March
    - A Family Affair
    - Nancy Steele Is Missing!
  - 22 March
    - Layla and Majnun (Iran)
  - 25 March
    - Seventh Heaven
  - 26 March
    - Maytime
    - Quality Street
  - 27 March
- Girl Loves Boy

=== April–June ===
- April 1937
  - 5 April
    - Elephant Boy (GB)
  - 9 April
    - The Soldier and the Lady
  - 10 April
    - Marked Woman
    - The Tale of the Fox (Germany)
  - 16 April
    - Way Out West
  - 18 April
    - Love from a Stranger (GB)
  - 20 April
    - A Star Is Born
  - 23 April
    - The Woman I Love
  - 28 April
    - Woman Chases Man
  - 30 April
    - Night Must Fall
- May 1937
  - 7 May
    - Shall We Dance
    - They Gave Him a Gun
  - 8 May
    - The Prince and the Pauper
  - 9 May
    - Make Way for Tomorrow
    - The Vicar of Bray
  - 19 May
    - Academy Award Review of Walt Disney Cartoons
  - 21 May
    - Charlie Chan at the Olympics
    - Pick a Star
  - 26 May
    - Kid Galahad
  - 28 May
    - This Is My Affair
- June 1937
  - 1 June
    - Knight Without Armour (GB)
    - The Road Back
  - 4 June
    - Parnell
  - 8 June
    - Grand Illusion (France)
  - 11 June
    - A Day at the Races
  - 12 June
    - Storm in a Teacup (GB)
  - 17 June
    - King Solomon's Mines (GB)
  - 23 June
    - Slim
  - 25 June
    - Captains Courageous
    - Wee Willie Winkie
  - 30 June
    - Silver Blaze

=== July–September ===
- July 1937
  - 6 July
    - The Edge of the World (GB)
  - 7 July
    - Easy Living
  - 14 July
    - They Won't Forget
  - 15 July
    - Ever Since Eve
  - 16 July
    - Topper
  - 21 July
    - High, Wide, and Handsome
  - 23 July
    - Saratoga
  - 24 July
    - Street Angel (China)
- August 1937
  - 3 August
    - You Can't Have Everything
  - 4 August
    - Artists and Models
  - 6 August
    - Stella Dallas
  - 9 August
    - Souls at Sea
  - 11 August
    - The Life of Emile Zola
  - 19 August
    - Confession
  - 20 August
    - Broadway Melody of 1938
  - 25 August
    - Humanity and Paper Balloons (Japan)
  - 27 August
    - Dead End
  - 31 August
    - To New Shores (Germany)
- September 1937
  - 1 September
    - The Firefly
  - 2 September
    - The Prisoner of Zenda
  - 3 September
    - Big City
  - 5 September
    - One Hundred Men and a Girl
  - 7 September
    - It Happened in Hollywood
  - 10 September
    - Annapolis Salute
    - Gribouille (France)
  - 16 September
    - Victoria the Great (GB)
  - 18 September
    - That Certain Woman
  - 24 September
    - Tři vejce do skla (Czechoslovakia)
  - 26 September
    - The Dybbuk
  - 30 September
    - Something to Sing About

=== October–December ===
- October 1937
  - 1 October
    - Madame X
  - 2 October
    - Love Is on the Air
  - 8 October
    - Stage Door
  - 10 October
    - Law for Tombstone
  - 12 October
    - Green Fields
  - 14 October
    - Think Fast, Mr. Moto
  - 15 October
    - The Bride Wore Red
    - Double Wedding
    - Heidi
  - 20 October
    - Bizarre, Bizarre (France)
  - 21 October
    - The Awful Truth
  - 22 October
    - Conquest
    - Yoshiwara (France)
  - 23 October
    - The Perfect Specimen
  - 29 October
    - Ali Baba Goes to Town
    - Angel
    - Stand-In
  - 30 October
    - The Great Garrick
- November 1937
  - 9 November
    - The Hurricane
  - 12 November
    - The Last Gangster
  - 19 November
    - A Damsel in Distress
    - Navy Blue and Gold
  - 20 November
    - It's Love I'm After
  - 25 November
    - Nothing Sacred
- December 1937
  - 2 December
    - Andula Won (Czechoslovakia)
    - The Seven Ravens (Germany)
  - 4 December
    - First Lady
  - 7 December
    - Telephone Operator
  - 10 December
    - Born to the West
  - 17 December
    - Daughter of Shanghai
  - 18 December
    - La Habanera (Germany)
  - 21 December
    - Skeleton on Horseback (Czechoslovakia)
  - 24 December
    - Rosalie
    - True Confession
  - 25 December
    - Tovarich
  - 29 December
    - You're a Sweetheart
  - 31 December
    - Wells Fargo
    - Wise Girl

== Serials ==
- Blake of Scotland Yard, starring Ralph Byrd and Herbert Rawlinson
- Dick Tracy, starring Ralph Byrd
- Jungle Jim
- Jungle Menace, starring Frank Buck
- The Mysterious Pilot, starring Frank Hawks
- The Painted Stallion, starring Ray Corrigan
- Radio Patrol
- Secret Agent X-9, starring Scott Kolk
- S.O.S. Coast Guard, starring Ralph Byrd and Bela Lugosi
- Tim Tyler's Luck, starring Frankie Thomas
- Wild West Days
- Zorro Rides Again, starring John Carroll

== Comedy film series ==
- Harold Lloyd (1913–1938)
- Charlie Chaplin (1914–1940)
- Lupino Lane (1915–1939)
- Buster Keaton (1917–1944)
- Laurel and Hardy (1921–1945)
- Our Gang (1922–1944)
- Wheeler and Woolsey (1929–1937)
- The Marx Brothers (1929–1946)
- The Three Stooges (1934–1959)

== Animated short film series ==
- Krazy Kat (1925–1940)
- Oswald the Lucky Rabbit (1927–1938)
- Mickey Mouse (1928–1953)
- Silly Symphonies
  - Woodland Café
  - Little Hiawatha
  - The Old Mill
- Screen Songs (1929–1938)
- Looney Tunes (1930–1969)
- Terrytoons (1930–1964)
- Merrie Melodies (1931–1969)
- Scrappy (1931–1941)
- Betty Boop (1932–1939)
- Popeye (1933–1957)
- Happy Harmonies (1934–1938)
- Color Rhapsodies (1934–1949)
- Meany, Miny, and Moe (1936-1937)
- Donald Duck (1937–1956)
- Pluto (1937–1951)

== Births ==
- January 1 – Suzy Kendall, British actress
- January 2 – Terence Rigby, English actor (d. 2008)
- January 4 – Dyan Cannon, American actress
- January 10 – John M. Watson Sr., American actor and musician (d. 2006)
- January 11 – Felix Silla, Italian actor, musician, stunt artist and voice artist (d. 2021)
- January 12 – Shirley Eaton, English actress and model
- January 14 – Stefano Satta Flores, Italian actor and voice actor (d. 1985)
- January 15 – Margaret O'Brien, American actress
- January 16 – Lorraine Bayly, Australian actress, singer, director and writer (d. 2026)
- January 17 – Dick Durock, American actor and stuntman (d. 2009)
- January 24
  - Julie Gregg, American actress (d. 2016)
  - Barton Heyman, American actor (d. 1996)
- January 30 – Vanessa Redgrave, English actress
- January 31 – Suzanne Pleshette, American actress (d. 2008)
- February 1 – Garrett Morris, American comedian, actor and singer
- February 2 – Tom Smothers, American comedian and musician (d. 2023)
- February 14 – Soher Al Bably, Egyptian actress (d. 2021)
- February 17 – Benjamin Whitrow, English actor (d. 2017)
- February 19 – David Margulies, American actor (d. 2016)
- February 21 – Gary Lockwood, American actor
- February 24 – Shawn Elliott, American actor and singer (d. 2016)
- February 25 – Tom Courtenay, English actor
- February 27 – Barbara Babcock, American character actress
- March 3 – Bobby Driscoll, American actor (d. 1968)
- March 5 – Sal Borgese, Italian actor
- March 10 – Joe Viterelli, American actor (d. 2004)
- March 19 - Maurice Roëves, British actor (d. 2020)
- March 21 – Bill Capizzi, American voice actor (d. 2007)
- March 22 – Angelo Badalamenti, American screen composer (d. 2022)
- March 23
  - Tony Burton, American actor (d. 2016)
  - Chung King-fai, Hong Kong actor (d. 2026)
- March 30
  - Warren Beatty, American actor and director
  - James D. Brubaker, American film producer (d. 2023)
- April 1
  - Jordan Charney, American character actor
  - Yılmaz Güney, Kurdish director, screenwriter, actor, producer and author (d. 1984)
- April 2 – Ken Olfson, American actor (d. 1997)
- April 3 – Lawrence Dane, Canadian actor and producer (d. 2022)
- April 4 - Thomas Mauch, German cinematographer and producer
- April 6
  - Terrence Hardiman, English actor (d. 2023)
  - Billy Dee Williams, American actor
- April 9 - Marty Krofft, Canadian puppeteer and film producer (d. 2023)
- April 12 - Dennis Banks, Native American actor and activist (d. 2017)
- April 13
  - Corinne Cole, American actress
  - Edward Fox, English actor
- April 15
  - Rochelle Oliver, American actress (d. 2024)
  - Uldis Pūcītis, Latvian actor (d. 2000)
  - Frank Vincent, American actor (d. 2017)
- April 18 – Robert Hooks, American actor and producer
- April 19 – Elinor Donahue, American actress
- April 20 – George Takei, American actor, author and activist
- April 22 – Jack Nicholson, American actor
- April 27 – Sandy Dennis, American actress (d. 1992)
- May 5 – John Martino, American actor
- May 8 – Shin Seong-il, South Korean actor (d. 2018)
- May 12
  - George Carlin, American stand-up comedian, actor, social critic and author (d. 2008)
  - Susan Hampshire, English actress
- May 16 – Yvonne Craig, American actress (d. 2015)
- May 19 – Pat Roach, English actor and professional wrestler (d. 2004)
- June 1 – Morgan Freeman, American actor and director
- June 2 – Sally Kellerman, American actress and singer (d. 2022)
- June 10 – Luciana Paluzzi, Italian actress
- June 11
  - Johnny Brown, American actor and singer (d. 2022)
  - Chad Everett, American actor (d. 2012)
- June 14 – Jørgen Leth, Danish director (d. 2025)
- June 16 – Charmian May, English character actress (d. 2002)
- June 17 - Arthur Schmidt, American film editor (d. 2023)
- June 26 – Sombat Metanee, Thai actor and film director (d. 2022)
- June 28 – Richard Bright, American actor (d. 2006)
- July 2 – Polly Holliday, American actress (d. 2025)
- July 6 – Ned Beatty, American character actor (d. 2021)
- July 12 – Bill Cosby, American stand-up comedian and actor
- July 16 – Ada Rogovtseva, Ukrainian actress
- July 19 – Richard Jordan, American actor (d. 1993)
- July 20
  - Ken Ogata, Japanese actor (d. 2008)
  - Timothy Scott, American actor (d. 1995)
- July 21 – Gray Frederickson, American film producer (d. 2022)
- July 25 – Paul Collins, British actor
- July 27 - Don Galloway, American actor (d. 2009)
- July 28 – Viktor Merezhko, Russian screenwriter, actor, writer and television presenter (d. 2022)
- August 3
  - Steven Berkoff, British actor and playwright
  - Richard Foronjy, American actor (d. 2024)
- August 5 – Alan Howard, English actor (d. 2015)
- August 6 – Barbara Windsor, English comedy actress (d. 2020)
- August 8 – Dustin Hoffman, American actor
- August 12 - Carol Rossen, America actress
- August 14
  - Fran Bennett, American actress (d. 2021)
  - Alberta Nelson, American actress (d. 2006)
- August 16 – Lorraine Gary, American retired actress
- August 17 - Spiros Focás, Greek actor (d. 2023)
- August 19 – Evadne Baker, English actress (d. 1995)
- August 26 – Kenji Utsumi, Japanese actor (d. 2013)
- September 4
  - Mikk Mikiver, Estonian actor and director (d. 2006)
  - Nicholas Worth, American character actor (d. 2007)
- September 5 - Dick Clement, British director and screenwriter
- September 6 – Jo Anne Worley, American actress, comedian and singer
- September 7
  - Cüneyt Arkın, Turkish film actor, producer and director (d. 2022)
  - Ray Donn, English actor
  - John Phillip Law, American actor (d. 2008)
- September 10 – Brian Murray, South African actor and theatre director (d. 2018)
- September 13
  - Don Bluth, American director and producer
  - Meeli Sööt, Estonian actress (d. 2024)
- September 21
  - Ron Cobb, American-Australian graphic and film designer (d. 2020)
  - Aarne Üksküla, Estonian actor (d. 2017)
- September 24 – Dee Pollock, American actor (d. 2005)
- September 26 – Jerry Weintraub, American producer and actor (d. 2015)
- October 7 – Clive Graham, British actor (d. 2007)
- October 10
  - Vic Tablian, Armenian-British actor
  - Peter White, American actor (d. 2023)
- October 11 – Ron Leibman, American actor (d. 2019)
- October 13 - Sami Frey, French actor
- October 14 - Carroll Ballard, American director
- October 15 – Linda Lavin, American actress and singer (d. 2024)
- October 21 – Édith Scob, French actress (d. 2019)
- October 22 – Alan Ladd Jr., American film producer (d. 2022)
- November 4 – Loretta Swit, American actress (d. 2025)
- November 5 – Harris Yulin, American actor (d. 2025)
- November 10 - Albert Hall, American actor
- November 13 - Adam Holender, Polish-American cinematographer
- November 17 – Peter Cook, British satirist and comedic actor (d. 1995)
- November 21
  - Ingrid Pitt, Polish-born British actress (d. 2010)
  - Marlo Thomas, American actress and producer
- November 23 – Dora Cadavid, Colombian actress, singer and announcer (d. 2022)
- November 27 – Rodney Bewes, English actor (d. 2017)
- November 30 – Ridley Scott, English director and producer
- December 4
  - Max Baer Jr., American actor, producer, comedian and director
  - David Bailie, South African actor (d. 2021)
  - Donnelly Rhodes, Canadian actor (d. 2018)
- December 7
  - Kenneth Colley, English actor (d. 2025)
  - Larry Hankin, American character actor
- December 8 – James MacArthur, American actor (d. 2010)
- December 9 – Darwin Joston, American actor (d. 1998)
- December 11 - Stephen Moore, English actor (d. 2019)
- December 12 – Connie Francis, American singer and actress (d. 2025)
- December 13 – Rob Houwer, Dutch producer (d. 2025)
- December 16 – Joyce Bulifant, American actress
- December 21 – Jane Fonda, American actress
- December 29 – Barbara Steele, English actress
- December 30 – Zaldy Zshornack, Filipino actor (d. 2002)
- December 31 – Anthony Hopkins, Welsh actor

== Deaths ==
- January 2 – Ross Alexander, 29, American actor, Captain Blood, A Midsummer Night's Dream, Flirtation Walk
- January 3 – Perry N. Vekroff, 55, American actor and director, Trailed by Three, A Woman's Experience
- January 13 – Martin Johnson, 52, American documentary filmmaker, Congorilla
- January 16 – John Miltern, 66, Actor, Big Town
- January 21 – Marie Prevost, 40, Canadian-born American actress, The Marriage Circle, The Racket, The Godless Girl, Cain and Mabel
- January 31 – Wallace Smith, 48, American writer and illustrator, The Gay Desperado
- February 16 – Paul Graetz, 47, German actor, Mr. Cohen Takes a Walk
- February 17 – George Hassell, 55, English actor, Captain Blood, Becky Sharp
- February 24
  - Humphrey Pearson, 43, American screenwriter, Red Salute
  - Sir Guy Standing, 63, English actor, Lloyd's of London
- March 1 - DeWitt Jennings, 65, American actor, Mutiny on the Bounty
- March 6 - Frank Vosper, 37, English actor, Blind Justice
- March 11
  - W. Graham Browne, 67, Irish actor, The Night of the Party
  - John F. Goodrich, 50, American screenwriter, The Last Command
- April 2 - Edward Laemmle, 49, American director, Top o' the Morning
- April 5 - Émile Pathé, French co-organiser of Pathé Frères
- April 7 - Helen Burgess, 20, American actress, The Plainsman, A Doctor's Diary
- April 10 - Ralph Ince, 50, American actor and director, The Sea Wolf
- April 20 - Fredric Hope, 37, American art director, The Merry Widow
- April 24 - Lucy Beaumont, 67, English actress, The Greater Glory
- April 29 - William Gillette, 83, American actor, Sherlock Holmes
- May 1 – Snitz Edwards, 69, Austro-Hungarian-born American actor, The Thief of Bagdad, The Phantom of the Opera, Seven Chances, College
- May 10 – William Tedmarsh, 61, English-American silent film actor
- June 5 – Emmett J. Flynn, 54-55, American director, A Connecticut Yankee in King Arthur's Court
- June 7
  - Jean Harlow, 26, American actress, The Public Enemy, Libeled Lady, Suzy, Red Dust
  - Monroe Owsley, 37, American actor, Holiday, Indiscreet, The Keyhole, Ex-Lady
- June 25 – Colin Clive, 37, British actor, Frankenstein, Bride of Frankenstein
- September 21 – Osgood Perkins, 45, American actor, Scarface, Gold Diggers of 1937
- November 13 – Mrs. Leslie Carter, 75, American stage and screen actress, Becky Sharp, Rocky Mountain Mystery
- December 21 – Ted Healy, 41, American actor and creator of The Three Stooges, San Francisco, Mad Love, Beer and Pretzels, Soup to Nuts

== Film debuts ==
- Don Beddoe – The 13th Man
- Larry J. Blake – Secret Agent X-9
- Lee Bowman – Clarence
- Hillary Brooke – New Faces of 1937
- Jack Carson – You Only Live Once
- James Craig – Sophie Lang Goes West
- Broderick Crawford – Woman Chases Man
- Laraine Day – Stella Dallas
- Albert Dekker – The Great Garrick
- Gabriel Dell – Dead End
- Douglas Evans – Public Cowboy No. 1
- Richard Farnsworth – A Day at the Races
- Hertha Feiler – Darling of the Sailors
- Mary Field – Call It a Day
- Márta Fónay – Viki
- Frances Gifford – Woman Chases Man
- Jody Gilbert – Confession
- Leo Gorcey – Dead End
- Lorna Gray – Hold 'Em Navy
- William Haade – Kid Galahad
- Huntz Hall – Dead End
- Billy Halop – Dead End
- Irene Handl – Missing, Believed Married
- John Hart – Daughter of Shanghai
- Susan Hayward – Hollywood Hotel
- Darryl Hickman – The Prisoner of Zenda
- Riley Hill – The Firefly
- John Hubbard – Hold 'Em Navy
- Allyn Joslyn – They Won't Forget
- Carole Landis – The King and the Chorus Girl
- Edward Lexy – Action for Slander
- Herbert Lom – Woman Below the Cross
- William Lundigan – Armored Car
- Donald O'Connor – It Can't Last Forever
- Damian O'Flynn – Marked Woman
- Oscar O'Shea – The Good Old Soak
- Nestor Paiva – Island Captives
- Ronald Reagan – Love Is on the Air
- Lynne Roberts – Circus Girl
- Blossom Rock – My Dear Miss Aldrich
- Victor Sen Yung – The Good Earth
- Peggy Stewart – Wells Fargo
- Amzie Strickland – You Only Live Once
- Gloria Talbott – Maytime
- Ray Teal – Sweetheart of the Navy
- Richard Todd – Good Morning, Boys
- Rosella Towne – Varsity Show
- Lana Turner – They Won't Forget
- Archie R. Twitchell – Sophie Lang Goes West
- Wally Vernon – Mountain Music
- Anthony Warde – Escape by Night
- Jan Wiley – New Faces of 1937
- Monty Woolley – Live, Love and Learn
- Jeff York – Kid Galahad

== Bibliography ==
- Block, Alex Ben; Wilson, Lucy Autrey, eds. (2010). George Lucas's Blockbusting: A Decade-By-Decade Survey of Timeless Movies Including Untold Secrets of Their Financial and Cultural Success. HarperCollins. ISBN 978-0-06-177889-6.
