= Bedevilled (1955 film) =

1955 film by Mitchell Leisen

- Directed by: Mitchell Leisen
- Written by: Jo Eisinger
- Produced by: Henry Berman
- Starring: Anne Baxter; Steve Forrest; Simone Renant
- Cinematography: Freddie Young
- Edited by: Frank Clarke
- Music by: William Alwyn
- Production company: Metro-Goldwyn-Mayer
- Distributed by: Metro-Goldwyn-Mayer
- Release date: April 28, 1955
- Running time: 85 minutes
- Country: United States
- Language: English
- Budget: $868,000
- Box office: $1,047,000

Bedevilled is a 1955 American crime drama film directed by Mitchell Leisen and starring Anne Baxter, Steve Forrest and Simone Renant.

== Plot ==
Gregory Fitzgerald and his friend Tony are leaving New York to fly to France, where they will study for the priesthood. On the plane, French fashion designer Francesca flirts with the handsome Greg, unaware of his vocation, and gives him her phone number.

Greg goes to see Father du Rochet, leaving behind Tony, who is feeling ill from the flight. He ends up sharing a taxi with an American woman named Monica Johnson, who drops a St. Christopher's medal. He picks it up and follows her into a club, where it turns out Monica is a singer.

In her dressing room, Greg arrives just as three French policemen are questioning her. He speaks the language and is shocked to hear Monica using him as an alibi. Monica panics and runs into an alley, where Greg fights off a man who tries to grab her. Monica goes to her hotel to pack a suitcase, but flees from three men who knock Greg cold.

Tony is concerned by Greg's disappearance and even calls Francesca, wondering if she's heard from him. Greg wakes up and is told by the concierge that Monica has been in touch. He goes to Napoleon's tomb to meet her. Monica says she witnessed the murder of a man and is now being pursued by men who work for the criminal responsible, Trevelle.

As they find a place to hide, Monica makes a romantic advance toward Greg, who resists. She later learns from Tony that they are in France to join a seminary.

Greg goes to seek help from Francesca, who is willing to help, her way; she takes Greg to meet Trevelle, a wealthy customer of hers. The story he is told is that the murdered man was Trevelle's brother, Michel, who had been romantically involved with the American woman.

Greg returns to Monica but is trailed by Trevelle's men despite his promise not to have Greg followed. The two escape by the roofs and find refuge in a church where Du Rochet is saying Mass. When they are safe, a confrontation with Greg turns up the truth, Monica's admission that she shot Michel when she tried to break up with him because he was married, but refused to let her go after having destroyed cruelly her chance to marry someone else.

She leaves and is shot in the street by Trevelle's men. Greg runs after her and assists her in reciting the Act of Contrition in which she expresses sorrow for her sins, as she dies in his arms, being saved from eternal damnation.

== Cast ==
- Anne Baxter as Monica Johnson
- Steve Forrest as Gregory Fitzgerald
- Simone Renant as Francesca
- Maurice Teynac as Trevelle
- Robert Christopher as Tony Lugacetti
- Joseph Tomelty as Father Cunningham
- Victor Francen as Father Du Rocher
- Raymond Bussières as Concierge
- Jacques Hilling as Taxi Driver
- Olivier Hussenot as Remy Hotel Manager

== Reception ==
According to MGM records the film earned $525,000 in the US and Canada and $522,000 elsewhere resulting in a loss of $518,000.

== See also ==
- List of American films of 1955
