= Thirteen Days of Love =

1935 film

- Directed by: Louis Valray
- Written by: Anne Valray; Louis Valray
- Produced by: Louis Valray
- Starring: Colette Darfeuil; Samson Fainsilber; Simone Renant
- Cinematography: Georges Million
- Music by: Jacqueline Batell
- Production companies: A.V. Films; Les Films Indépendants
- Distributed by: Cinédis
- Release date: 24 May 1935
- Running time: 83 minutes
- Country: France
- Language: French

Thirteen Days of Love (French: Escale) is a 1935 French drama film directed by Louis Valray and starring Colette Darfeuil, Samson Fainsilber and Simone Renant. The film's sets were designed by the art directors Jacques Krauss and Jean Lafitte.

== Synopsis ==
Jean, a naval officer falls in love with Eva the mistress of a smuggler. However, although she is attracted towards the honourable Jean, she finds herself drawn back into the arms of her lover Dario when the naval officer is away at sea.

== Cast ==
- Colette Darfeuil as Eva
- Samson Fainsilber as Dario
- Simone Renant as Marcelle
- Pierre Nay as Jean
- Serge Arola as René
- Féral Benga as Zama
- Darlo as Zaphiro, le rasta
- Frédéric Mariotti as Giuseppi, le Sicilien
- Parmeline as Hervé, le capitaine
- Sylmia as La chanteuse
- Papin as La commère
- Altiani as Pietri, le colon
- Jacques Jou-Jerville as Le brigadier des douanes
- Dupont as Le juge d'instruction
- Fernande Saala as Suzie
- Suzy Solidor as Chanteuse de 'La Belle Escale'

== Bibliography ==
- Bessy, Maurice & Chirat, Raymond. Histoire du cinéma français: 1935-1939. Pygmalion, 1986.
- Crisp, Colin. Genre, Myth and Convention in the French Cinema, 1929-1939. Indiana University Press, 2002.
- Neupert, Richard. French Film History, 1895–1946. University of Wisconsin Pres, 2022.
- Rège, Philippe. Encyclopedia of French Film Directors, Volume 1. Scarecrow Press, 2009.
