= The Mysterious Monsieur Sylvain =

1947 film

- Directed by: Jean Stelli
- Written by: Marc-Gilbert Sauvajon; Solange Térac
- Starring: Frank Villard; Simone Renant; Jean Chevrier
- Cinematography: René Gaveau
- Edited by: Claude Nicole
- Music by: René Sylviano
- Production company: Paris Production de Films
- Distributed by: Consortium du Film
- Release date: 16 April 1947
- Running time: 95 minutes
- Country: France
- Language: French

The Mysterious Monsieur Sylvain (French: Le mystérieux Monsieur Sylvain) is a 1947 French mystery film directed by Jean Stelli and starring Frank Villard, Simone Renant and Jean Chevrier. It was shot at the Billancourt Studios in Paris with sets designed by the art director Emile Alex.

== Synopsis ==
When an engineer at a naval base is murdered three different men turn up claiming to be Monsieur Sylvain, a detective assigned to the case.

== Cast ==
- Frank Villard as Ancelin
- Simone Renant as Françoise Dastier
- Jean Chevrier as Chantenay
- Jean Marchat as Morgat
- Marcelle Praince as La marquise
- André Bervil as Le tueur
- Marcel Raine as Le commandant Dartois
- Paul Amiot as Le colonel
- Claude Nollier
- Suzanne Bara
- Roger Bontemps
- Max Doria
- Jacques Mattler
- Jacques Muller
- Roger Coirault
- Maud Lamy

== Bibliography ==
- Rège, Philippe. Encyclopedia of French Film Directors, Volume 1. Scarecrow Press, 2009.
