= Romance for Three =

1942 film

- Directed by: Roger Richebé
- Written by: Denys Amiel; Jean Aurenche; Pierre Lestringuez; Roger Richebé
- Based on: Trois Et Une by Denys Amiel
- Produced by: Roger Richebé
- Starring: Fernand Gravey; Simone Renant; Bernard Blier
- Cinematography: Victor Arménise
- Edited by: Jean Feyte
- Music by: Vincent Scotto
- Production company: Films Roger Richebé
- Distributed by: Films Roger Richebé
- Release date: 17 June 1942
- Running time: 98 minutes
- Country: France
- Language: French

Romance for Three (French: Romance à trois) is a 1942 French comedy film directed by Roger Richebé and starring Fernand Gravey, Simone Renant and Bernard Blier. It was based on the play Trois Et Une by Denys Amiel. The film's sets were designed by the art director Jacques Krauss.

== Synopsis ==
Loys Erland has three separate sons from her three separate marriages, all of whom have very different personalities and interests. One is a banker, one a composer and one a sportsman. Trouble arises when all three fall in love with the attractive Huguette.

== Cast ==
- Fernand Gravey as Charles
- Simone Renant as Huguette
- Bernard Blier as Marcel
- Michel Marsay as Pierre
- Denise Grey as Loys Erland
- Paul Barge as Un acheteur
- Paul Faivre as Le commissaire-priseur
- Henri Richard as Ferrero

== Bibliography ==
- Goble, Alan. The Complete Index to Literary Sources in Film. Walter de Gruyter, 1999.
- Rège, Philippe. Encyclopedia of French Film Directors, Volume 1. Scarecrow Press, 2009.
