= Samson Fainsilber =

Romanian-born French film actor

- Born: 18 June 1904; Iași, Romania
- Died: 19 December 1983 (aged 79); Paris, France
- Other name: Louis André
- Occupation: Actor
- Years active: 1930 - 1983 (film)

Samson Fainsilber (French: [sɑ̃sɔ̃ fɛ̃silbɛʁ]; 18 June 1904, Iași – 19 December 1983, Paris) was a Romanian-born French film actor. During his career he appeared in around sixty films and television series. He featured in the 1933 historical drama Roger la Honte.

== Partial filmography ==
- The Shark (1930, directed by Henri Chomette) - L'avocat
- La Fin du monde (1931, directed by Abel Gance) - Schomburg
- Les Trois Mousquetaires (1932, directed by Henri Diamant-Berger) - Cardinal Richelieu
- Mater dolorosa (1933)
- Roger la Honte (1933, directed by Gaston Roudès) - Lucien de Noirville
- Jocelyn (1933) - Jocelyn
- The Bread Peddler (1934) - Castel
- Le bossu (1934) - Monsieur de Peyrolles
- Gangster malgré lui (1935) - Marc
- Napoléon Bonaparte (1935) - Danton (voice)
- Thirteen Days of Love (1935) - Dario
- Odette (1935) - Dario d'Alhucemas
- Jérôme Perreau, héros des barricades (1935, directed by Abel Gance) - Conti
- Marie des angoisses (1935) - Paco
- Retour à l'aube (1938, directed by Henri Decoin) - L'inspecteur Veber
- Tourbillon de Paris (1939, directed by Henri Diamant-Berger)
- Dorothy Looks for Love (1945, directed by Edmond T. Gréville) - Sylvain
- Clandestine (1946) - Dr. Netter
- Le village de la colère (1947)
- Si Versailles m'était conté (1954, directed by Sacha Guitry) - Le cardinal de Mazarin (uncredited)
- Si Paris nous était conté (1956, directed by Sacha Guitry) - Mazarin (uncredited)
- Don Juan, or If Don Juan Were a Woman (1973)
- Stavisky (1974) - L'employé au fichier
- Un linceul n'a pas de poches (1974) - Gonzague
- Il faut vivre dangereusement (1975) - L'homme aux oiseaux
- Providence (1977, directed by Alain Resnais) - The Old Man
- Animal (1977) - Le vieux maquilleur russe
- Charles and Lucie (1979) - Le gobeur d'oeufs
- Subversion (1979)
- La vie est un roman (1983, directed by Alain Resnais) - Zoltán Forbek

== Bibliography ==
- Goble, Alan. The Complete Index to Literary Sources in Film. Walter de Gruyter, 1999.
