= Marcel Lucien =

French cinematographer

- Born: 5 March 1902; Antibes, France
- Died: 22 August 1958 (aged 56); Paris, France
- Occupation: Cinematographer
- Years active: 1926-1952 (film)

Marcel Lucien (1902-1958) was a French cinematographer.

== Selected filmography ==
- The Woman with Closed Eyes (1926)
- The Garden of Allah (1927)
- Le Bled (1929)
- Baroud (1932)
- Night at the Crossroads (1932)
- Boudu Saved from Drowning (1932)
- Miss Helyett (1933)
- The Barber of Seville (1933)
- The Queen of Biarritz (1934)
- Confessions of a Cheat (1936)
- The Dying Land (1936)
- Rigolboche (1936)
- Monsieur Personne (1936)
- Josette (1937)
- Francis the First (1937)
- In Venice, One Night (1937)
- The House Opposite (1937)
- Captain Benoit (1938)
- Rail Pirates (1938)
- Alert in the Mediterranean (1938)
- Three from St Cyr (1939)
- Fire in the Straw (1939)
- Hangman's Noose (1940)
- Forces occultes (1943)
- Inspector Sergil (1947)
- Last Chance Castle (1947)

== Bibliography ==
- Nicholas Macdonald. In Search of La Grande Illusion: A Critical Appreciation of Jean Renoir's Elusive Masterpiece. McFarland, 2013.
