= Pierre Stéphen =

French actor (1890–1980)

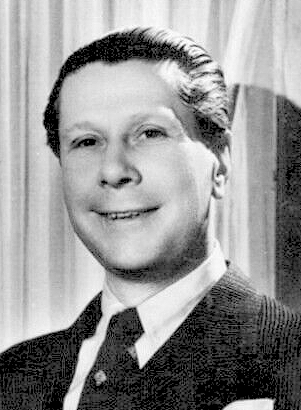
- Born: Pierre Trambouze; 28 April 1890; Paris, France
- Died: 3 June 1980 (aged 90); Paris, France
- Occupation: Actor
- Years active: 1920–1966 (film)

Pierre Stéphen (1890–1980) was a French film actor.

== Selected filmography ==
- Irène (1920)
- La dette (1920)
- Gigolette (1921)
- La brèche d'enfer (1923) - Le Vicomte de La Cardière
- Le double piège (1923)
- Le crime d'une sainte (1923) - Florimond
- Les deux baisers (1924)
- L'aventurier (1924) - André Varèze
- The Abbot Constantine (1925) - Paul de Lavardens
- The Woman with Closed Eyes (1926) - Le jeune homme
- La Girl aux mains fines (1926)
- Les mufles (1929) - Nicolas Jantet
- La ronde des heures (1931) - Monsieur de Mirsolle
- Un bouquet de flirts (1931)
- Azaïs (1931) - Félix Borneret
- I by Day, You by Night (1932) - Max Meyer
- The Porter from Maxim's (1933) - Octave
- A Love Story (1933) - Binder, musicien
- Moi et l'impératrice (1933)
- Nothing But Lies (1933) - Paul Daubreuil
- The Old Devil (1933) - Le professeur d'histoire / Ein Hauslehrer
- Ces messieurs de la Santé (1934) - Hector
- Arlette and Her Fathers (1934) - Lecouturier
- L'école des contribuables (1934) - Giroux
- Le billet de mille (1935) - Un comédien
- Compartiment de dames seules (1935) - Philippe Thomery
- La sonnette d'alarme (1935) - Gaston
- Paris Camargue (1935) - L'ami de Gérard
- The Pont-Biquet Family (1935) - Toupance
- La rosière des Halles (1935) - Victor Varel
- You Can't Fool Antoinette (1936) - Stanislas de Varini
- School for Journalists (1936) - Fernand Dubreuil
- Oeil de lynx, détective (1936) - Jérôme
- Au son des guitares (1936) - Pierre
- The House Opposite (1937) - Mouche
- L'amour veille (1937) - Ernest Vernet
- Rendez-vous Champs-Elysées (1937) - Pierre
- Monsieur Bégonia (1937) - Poussier
- Un meurtre a été commis (1938) - Le Furet
- Les femmes collantes (1938) - Hippolyte Loupiot
- Clodoche (1938) - Jacques
- Three Waltzes (1938) - Le journaliste
- Une java (1939) - Le Tordu
- Raphaël le tatoué (1939) - Max Corner
- His Uncle from Normandy (1939) - Ambroise, le clerc de notaire
- Grey contre X (1940) - Jean Cartenet
- Strange Suzy (1941) - Joseph
- Nadia la femme traquée (1942) - Pierre Loiselet
- Melody for You (1942) - Ferdiand
- A Woman in the Night (1943) - Campolli
- La troisième dalle (1946) - Orfray
- Plume la poule (1947)
- The Woman I Murdered (1948) - Raoul Le Hardouin
- Le sorcier du ciel (1949) - Le maire des Garets
- Extravagant Theodora (1950) - Octave Leprieur
- Cartouche, King of Paris (1950) - Lignières
- J'y suis... j'y reste (1953) - Baron Hubert du Mont-Vermeil
- Mon curé champion du régiment (1956) - Le baron Honoré de Villetaneuse
- The Adventures of Arsène Lupin (1957) - Le bijoutier Clérissy
- Cinq millions comptant (1957) - Le représentant des parfums 'Volubilis'
- Sénéchal the Magnificent (1957) - Un joueur de poker
- Fric-frac en dentelles (1957) - Jim Courenju
- Comme un cheveu sur la soupe (1957) - Le commissaire de police
- L'amour est en jeu (1957)
- Trois marins en bordée (1957) - Marquis de Botarin
- Ni vu, ni connu (1958) - Le procureur
- Vice Squad (1959) - (uncredited)
- Tendre et violente Elisabeth (1960) - Le médecin
- La salamandre d'or (1962)

== Bibliography ==
- Goble, Alan. The Complete Index to Literary Sources in Film. Walter de Gruyter, 1999.
