= Monsieur Bégonia =

1937 film

- Directed by: André Hugon
- Written by: Georges Fagot
- Based on: Monsieur Bégonia by Georges Fagot
- Produced by: André Hugon
- Starring: Josette Day; Paul Pauley; Colette Darfeuil
- Cinematography: Marc Bujard; Tahar Hanache
- Music by: Jacques Janin; Vincent Scotto
- Production company: Productions André Hugon
- Release date: 22 December 1937
- Running time: 92 minutes
- Country: France
- Language: French

Monsieur Bégonia is a 1937 French comedy film directed by André Hugon and starring Josette Day, Paul Pauley and Colette Darfeuil. The film's sets were designed by the art director Émile Duquesne. It was remade in Italy in 1939 as L'amore si fa così.

== Synopsis ==
A man applies for the position of general manager at a fashion house but is rejected for being too young. He then disguises himself as a more mature man and calling himself Monsieur Bégonia he gets the job and proceeds to turn round the fortunes of the struggling company.

== Cast ==
- Josette Day as Marguerite
- Paul Pauley as Gaston Merchant
- Colette Darfeuil as Émilienne
- Max Régnier as Max ou Monsieur Bégonia
- Pierre Stéphen as Poussier
- Suzanne Dehelly as Aurélie Merchant
- Camille Bert as Le baron Papalagos
- Liliane Gauthieras Germaine
- Jean Kolb as Le directeur de la banque
- Robert Seller as Baptiste
- Odette Talazac as Une cliente
- Jean Toulout as L'inspecteur

== Bibliography ==
- Bessy, Maurice & Chirat, Raymond. Histoire du cinéma français: 1935-1939. Pygmalion, 1986.
- Crisp, Colin. Genre, Myth and Convention in the French Cinema, 1929-1939. Indiana University Press, 2002.
- Rège, Philippe. Encyclopedia of French Film Directors, Volume 1. Scarecrow Press, 2009.
