= The Beauty of Montparnasse =

1937 film

- Belgian poster
- Directed by: Maurice Cammage
- Written by: Maurice Hennequin (play); Paul Bilhaud (play); Albert Barré (play); Jacques Daniel-Norman
- Produced by: Jean Rivain
- Starring: Frédéric Duvallès; Jeanne Aubert; Colette Darfeuil
- Cinematography: Maurice Forster
- Music by: Casimir Oberfeld
- Production company: Cinérêve
- Distributed by: Les Films J. Sefert
- Release date: 11 June 1937
- Running time: 87 minutes
- Country: France
- Language: French

The Beauty of Montparnasse (French: La belle de Montparnasse) is a 1937 French comedy film directed by Maurice Cammage and starring Frédéric Duvallès, Jeanne Aubert and Colette Darfeuil. The film's sets were designed by the art director Robert Dumesnil.

== Synopsis ==
Mr. Pontbichot has long dreamed of cheating on his wife. To achieve his goal, he looks for a son-in-law who can help him, and finds him in a young painter who appeals to his daughter.

== Cast ==
- Frédéric Duvallès as Monsieur Pontbichot
- Jeanne Aubert as Claire
- Colette Darfeuil as Hélène
- Paul Pauley as Grésillon
- Monique Rolland as Jeanne
- André Bervil as Raphaël
- Enrico Glori as Ernesto
- Gaston Dupray as Le secrétaire
- Myno Burney as Rosalie
- Georges Bever as Coquelet
- Nicole Ray as Lily
- Pauline Carton as Madame Pontbichot
- Pierre Palau as Le baron Fléchard

== Bibliography ==
- Bessy, Maurice & Chirat, Raymond. Histoire du cinéma français: 1935-1939. Pygmalion, 1986.
- Crisp, Colin. Genre, Myth and Convention in the French Cinema, 1929-1939. Indiana University Press, 2002.
- Rège, Philippe. Encyclopedia of French Film Directors, Volume 1. Scarecrow Press, 2009.
