= Paul Pauley =

French actor

- Born: 18 February 1886; Paris, France
- Died: 13 May 1938 (aged 52); Paris, France
- Occupation: Actor
- Years active: 1921-1938 (film)

Paul Pauley (1886–1938) was a French stage and film actor.

== Selected filmography ==
- Count Kostia (1925)
- The Man in Evening Clothes (1931)
- Black and White (1931)
- Aces of the Turf (1932)
- Make-Up (1932)
- Étienne (1933)
- The Midnight Prince (1934)
- Rothchild (1934)
- The Coquelet Affair (1935)
- The Pont-Biquet Family (1935)
- Vertigo (1935)
- Speak to Me of Love (1935)
- You Can't Fool Antoinette (1936)
- Mercadet (1936)
- Monsieur Bégonia (1937)
- The Beauty of Montparnasse (1937)
- Beethoven's Great Love (1937)
- My Little Marquise (1937)

== Bibliography ==
- Goble, Alan. The Complete Index to Literary Sources in Film. Walter de Gruyter, 1999.
