= The House Opposite (1937 film) =

1937 film

- Directed by: Christian-Jaque
- Written by: Christian-Jaque; Paul Nivoix (play)
- Produced by: Jack Forrester; André Parant
- Starring: Elvire Popesco; André Lefaur; Pierre Stéphen
- Cinematography: Marcel Lucien
- Music by: Paul Misraki
- Production company: Forrester-Parant Productions
- Distributed by: Comptoir Français du Film
- Release date: 29 January 1937
- Running time: 95 minutes
- Country: France
- Language: French

The House Opposite (French: La maison d'en face) is a 1937 French comedy film directed by Christian-Jaque and Elvire Popesco, André Lefaur and Pierre Stéphen. The film's sets were designed by the art director Roland Quignon.

== Synopsis ==
Disappointed not to be given a promotion he expected and deserved, a respectable bank clerk leaves his job and takes a post running a building located directly opposite the bank.

== Cast ==
- Elvire Popesco as Madame Anna
- André Lefaur as Monsieur Pic
- Pierre Stéphen as Mouche
- André Berley as Renaudeau
- Pauline Carton as Aglaé
- Christiane Delyne as Gaby Duc
- Paul Faivre as Maringot
- Louis Florencie as Le contrôleur des contributions
- Anthony Gildès as Monval
- Milly Mathis as Louise
- Guy Parzy as Albert Pic
- Marthe Sarbel as La concierge
- Laure Senty as Hortense Pic
