= Paris (1937 film) =

- Directed by: Jean Choux
- Written by: René Benjamin (play); Jean Choux; Émile Roussel
- Starring: Harry Baur; Renée Saint-Cyr; Raymond Segard
- Cinematography: Joseph-Louis Mundwiller; André Thomas
- Edited by: Marthe Poncin
- Music by: Jacques Ibert; Jean Mag
- Production company: SIFFRA
- Distributed by: Ciné Sélection
- Release date: 15 January 1937
- Running time: 95 minutes
- Country: France
- Language: French

Paris is a 1937 French comedy drama film directed by Jean Choux and starring Harry Baur, Renée Saint-Cyr and Raymond Segard.

The film's sets were designed by the art director Claude Bouxin.

== Cast ==
- Harry Baur as Alexandre Lafortune
- Renée Saint-Cyr as Biche
- Raymond Segard as Antoine
- Christian Gérard as Coco
- Camille Bert as Grand-père
- Marcelle Servières as Madame Lambert
- Colette Borelli
- Jacques Bousquet
- Marfa d'Hervilly
- Fordyce
- Anthony Gildès
- Fred Poulin
- Rika Radifé
- Edouard Rousseau
- Odette Talazac

== Bibliography ==
- Alfred Krautz. International directory of cinematographers, set- and costume designers in film, Volume 4. Saur, 1984.
