= André Bervil =

French actor (1905–1972)

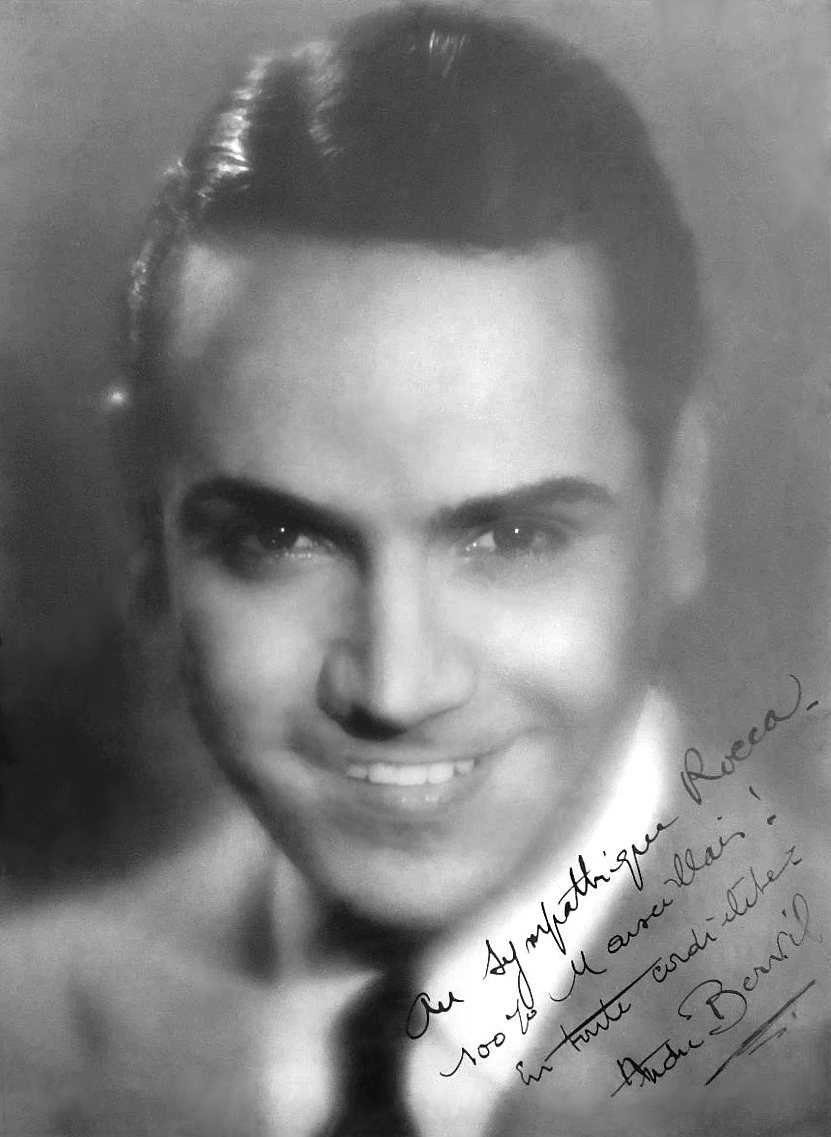
- Born: 25 November 1905; Paris, France
- Died: 20 January 1972 (aged 66); Nice, Alpes-Maritimes, France
- Occupation: Actor
- Years active: 1932-1966

André Bervil (1905–1972) was a French stage and film actor. He was married to the actress Suzanne Grey, and was son-in-law of Denise Grey.

== Selected filmography ==
- My Little Marquise (1937)
- The Beauty of Montparnasse (1937)
- The Lady from Vittel (1937)
- Monsieur Breloque Has Disappeared (1938)
- White Nights in Saint Petersburg (1938)
- Happy Days (1941)
- Bolero (1942)
- Fever (1942)
- Mademoiselle X (1945)
- The Temptation of Barbizon (1946)
- Gringalet (1946)
- The Mysterious Monsieur Sylvain (1947)
- The Seventh Door (1947)
- The Adventures of Casanova (1947)
- City of Hope (1948)
- The Cupboard Was Bare (1948)
- Keep an Eye on Amelia (1949)
- At the Grand Balcony (1949)
- The Cupid Club (1949)
- Amédée (1950)
- Manon of the Spring (1952)
- Her Last Christmas (1952)
- Madame du Barry (1954)
- Sophie and the Crime (1955)
- Les Truands (1956)
- Fernandel the Dressmaker (1956)
- The Hole (1960)

== Bibliography ==
- Maurice Bessy. Histoire du cinéma français: 1951-1955. Pygmalion, 1989.
