= My Little Marquise =

- Directed by: Robert Péguy
- Starring: Josseline Gaël; Paul Pauley; Fernand Fabre
- Cinematography: Nicolas Hayer
- Music by: Henri Poussigue
- Production company: BAP Films
- Distributed by: Les Films Sefert
- Release date: 15 December 1937
- Running time: 86 minutes
- Country: France
- Language: French

My Little Marquise (French: Ma petite marquise) is a 1937 French comedy film directed by Robert Péguy and starring Josseline Gaël, Paul Pauley and Fernand Fabre.

== Cast ==
- Jacotte as La petite Jacotte
- Josseline Gaël as Monique Cormier
- Paul Pauley as Adolphe Cormier
- André Bervil as Pierre Mareuil
- Fernand Fabre as François Mareuil
- François Rodon as Le petit Julien
- Yvette Andréyor as La tante
- Charlotte Clasis as Nounou
- Jacques Derives as Antoine
- Jean Brochard as Godard

== Bibliography ==
- Rège, Philippe. Encyclopedia of French Film Directors, Volume 1. Scarecrow Press, 2009.
