= Jeanne Aubert =

French singer and actress

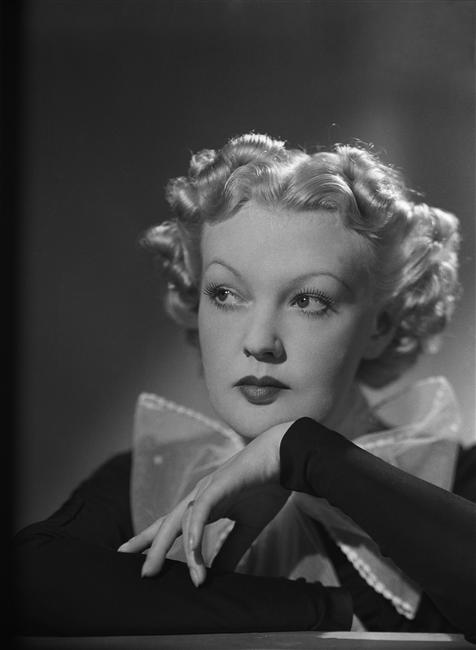
- Aubert in 1938
- Born: Jeanne Perrinot; 21 February 1900; Paris, France
- Died: 6 March 1988 (aged 88); Coubert, Seine-et-Marne, France
- Other name: Jane Aubert
- Occupations: Singer, actress
- Years active: 1911–1971

Jeanne Aubert (born Jeanne Perrinot; 21 February 1900 – 6 March 1988) was a French singer and actress.

== Biography ==
Aubert was born in Paris, France, to a single mother, Augustine Marguerite Perrinot, who pushed her daughter into a career in show business. Preceding her birth, four generations of Auberts had made artificial flowers. She herself worked in an artificial flower factory, but the influence of war changed the direction of her life. At age five, she began performing on stage at the Théâtre du Châtelet. As a teenager, she was given voice and music lessons and at age eighteen appeared in an elaborate Mistinguett production at the Casino de Paris. She sang in the chorus at the Apollo theater in Paris and had bit parts in revues at the Théâtre Édouard VII. She gained prominence when, as an understudy, she replaced the lead actress in Pennsylvania, Le Bon Juge. After that, she was signed for a featured role in a production in London and went on to perform in Belgium, Italy, and Switzerland. She came to the United States to perform in Gay Paree, where she sang songs in English at the Winter Garden Theater in New York.

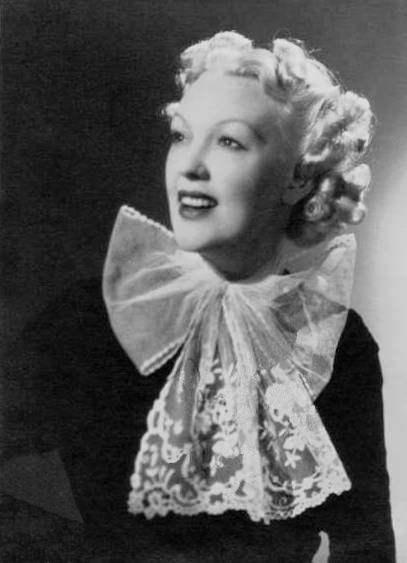
Jeanne Aubert (1926)

Using the stage name Jane Aubert, in 1929, she made her motion picture debut in the silent film, La Possession. Her film was seen by Nelson Swift Morris, son of Edward Morris of Chicago, Illinois a multi-millionaire whose family had made their fortune in meatpacking and who at the time was overseeing a meat processing operation in France. Morris used his connections to get to meet her and the two became involved. Eventually they moved to the United States and married but the marriage did not last. Morris opposed Aubert's acting so much that "He got out warrants forbidding her to appear in one show after another in Europe." In May 1937, Nelson Morris survived the Hindenburg disaster. This is referenced in Hindenburg: The Untold Story. Nelson Morris talks to others in a story and says, "The moral of this story is, never marry an actress."

In 1931, Aubert was a guest star on a radio broadcast on WJZ, singing selections from the show America's Sweetheart in which she appeared on Broadway. Her other Broadway credits included Princess Charming (1930), The Laugh Parade (1931), Ballyhoo of 1932 (1932), and Melody (1933).

Following her divorce, Aubert began working in Broadway musical comedies as well as making an appearance in the 1934 East Coast film production "The Gem of the Ocean". In 1935, she returned to her native France where she acted in several films during the ensuing two years. In 1937, she returned to the stage, performing in musical varieties with the celebrated singer Fréhel in Paris. She was part of a number of other shows in London and other cities throughout Europe including the original London production of Anything Goes by Cole Porter, in which she played the lead role of Reno Sweeney. Although never a headline star, for the next three decades her career was busy with numerous recordings, film and stage performances, and eventually roles on television.

== Death ==
Aubert died on 6 March 1988, aged 88, in a retirement home in Coubert, Seine-et-Marne, France, and was interred in the Cimetière parisien de Pantin in Pantin.

== Filmography ==
Year	Title	Role	Notes
1920	Être aimé pour soi même		
1929	La Possession	Passerose	
1935	The Scandalous Couple	Jeanne Aubry	
1936	Passé à vendre	Maryse Lancret	
1936	The Great Refrain	Léone de Vinci - une chanteuse vedette	
1936	The Blue Mouse	Nénette	
1937	Une femme qui se partage	Èvelyne de Lagny	
1937	À nous deux, madame la vie		
1937	The Beauty of Montparnasse	Claire	
1938	Mirages	Jeanne Dumont	
1957	Sénéchal the Magnificent	La colonelle Trochu	
1957	Love Is at Stake	Mme. Brémond	
1961	Les croulants se portent bien	Minouche Legrand	
1962	Les Ennemis	Mme de Lursac - la mère de Jean	
1966	Un monde nouveau	L'autre sage-femme	
