= Renée Saint-Cyr =

French actress

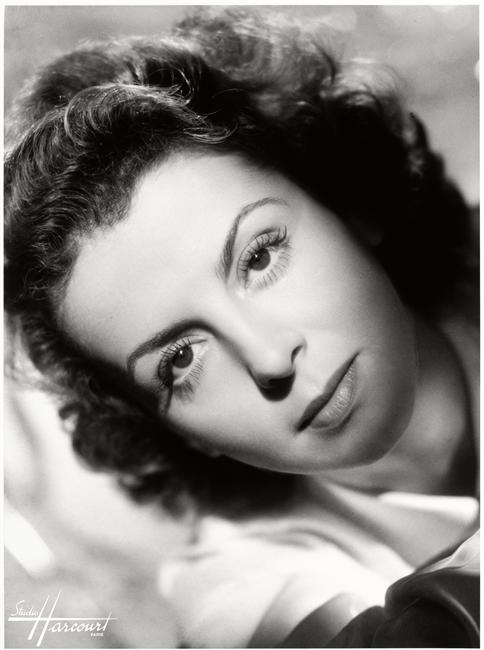
- Born: Marie-Louise Catherine Eugénie Renée Vittore; 16 November 1904; Beausoleil, Alpes-Maritimes, France
- Died: 11 July 2004 (aged 99); Neuilly-sur-Seine, France
- Occupation: Actress
- Years active: 1933–1994

Renée Saint-Cyr (French: [sɛ̃siʁ]; 16 November 1904 – 11 July 2004) was a French actress. Born Marie-Louise Catherine Eugénie Renée Vittore, she appeared in more than 60 films between 1933 and 1994. She was the mother of Georges Lautner, who also achieved fame in the film business, albeit as a director.

== Selected filmography ==
- The Two Orphans (1933) - Henriette
- Toto (1933) - Ginette
- D'amour et d'eau fraîche (1933) - Colette
- Incognito (1934)
- Une fois dans la vie (1934) - Lili
- Arlette and Her Fathers (1934) - Arlette
- The Last Billionaire (1934) - Princess Isabelle
- Le billet de mille (1935) - Gisèle, la vendeuse
- School for Coquettes (1935) - Ginette
- Royal Waltz (1936) - Thérèse Tomasoni
- Les pattes de mouche (1936) - Suzanne
- Valse éternelle (1936) - Marie-Claire
- Donogoo (1936) - Josette
- The Heart Disposes (1936) - Hélène
- Wolves Between Them (1936) - Nicole Servigne
- 27 Rue de la Paix (1936) - Gloria Grand
- Paris (1937) - Jeanne 'Biche' Lafortune
- Trois... six... neuf (1937) - Agnès
- The Pearls of the Crown (1937) - Madeleine de la Tour d'Auvergne
- Strange Boarders (1938) - Louise Blythe
- Women's Prison (1938) - Juliette Régent
- The Path of Honour (1939) - Renée de Marvilliers
- Night in December (1940) - Anne Morris / Helen Morris
- Red Roses (1940) - Maria Verani
- La Symphonie fantastique (1942) - Marie Martin
- The Lost Woman (1942) - Marie Vidal
- Madame et le mort (1943) - Clarisse Coquet
- Marie-Martine (1943) - Marie-Martine
- Retour de flamme (1943) - Edwige
- Pierre and Jean (1943) - Alice Roland
- Pamela (1945) - Paméla
- Strange Fate (1946) - Patricia
- L'insaisissable Frédéric (1946) - Solange Delmont
- The Beautiful Trip (1947) - Lena
- Tous les deux (1949) - Claude Chaussaigne
- The Voice of Dreams (1949) - Eve
- Shot at Dawn (1950) - Florence Hennings
- Captain Ardant (1951) - Maria del Fuego
- Le Chevalier de la nuit (1953) - Bella Fontanges
- Le Chevalier de Maison-Rouge (1954) - Marie-Antoinette
- The Blue Danube (1955) - Susanne
- If Paris Were Told to Us (1956) - L'Impératrice Eugènie
- Coctail party (1960) - Lavinia Chamberlayne
- La Fayette (1962) - Duchesse d'Ayen
- The Monocle Laughs (1964) - Madame Hui
- Déclic et des claques (1965) - La mère de Ferdinand
- Fleur d'oseille (1967) - La Directrice
- Jeunes filles bien... pour tous rapports (1968) - Frau Tissot
- Dieu a choisi Paris (1969)
- Quelques messieurs trop tranquilles (1973) - Countess
- O.K. patron (1974) - Yvette Hutin, la mère de Sophie
- Vous intéressez-vous à la chose? (1974) - La grand-mère
- Pas de problème! (1975) - Docteur Laville
- Now We've Seen It All! (1976) - Mme Ferroni
- Ils sont fous ces sorciers (1978) - Marie-Louise Précy-Lamont
- Est-ce bien raisonnable? (1981) - La veuve Bertillon
- Attention une femme peut en cacher une autre! (1983) - Mme Le Boucau / Mrs. Le Boucau
- Le cowboy (1985) - Marie-Louise, la mère de César
- L'invité surprise (1989) - Léa
- Room Service (1992) - La comtesse
- Sup de fric (1992) - Madame de Valmy
