= 2008 in science fiction =

The year 2008 was marked, in science fiction, by the following:

== Births and deaths ==
=== Deaths ===
- Forrest J. Ackerman
- Algis Budrys
- Arthur C. Clarke
- Michael Crichton
- Thomas M. Disch

== Literary releases ==
=== Novels ===
- Anathem, by Neal Stephenson
- The Gone-Away World, by Nick Harkaway
- The Three-Body Problem, by Liu Cixin
- The Hunger Games, by Suzanne Collins

=== Comics ===
Coppelion, by Tomonori Inoue, begines serialization in Weekly Young Magazine

== Movies ==
- Iron Man, dir. by Jon Favreau
- WALL-E, dir. by Andrew Stanton

== Video games ==
- Dead Space
- Fallout 3
- Spore

== Awards ==
=== Hugos ===
- Best novel: The Yiddish Policemen's Union, by Michael Chabon
- Best novella: All Seated on the Ground, by Connie Willis
- Best novelette: "The Merchant and the Alchemist's Gate", by Ted Chiang
- Best short story: "Tideline", by Elizabeth Bear
- Best related work: Brave New Words: The Oxford Dictionary of Science Fiction, ed. by Jeff Prucher
- Best dramatic presentation, long form: Stardust, written by Jane Goldman and Matthew Vaughan; dir. by Matthew Vaughan; based on the novel by Neil Gaiman, illustrated by Charles Vess
- Best dramatic presentation, short form: Doctor Who — "Blink", written by Steven Moffat, dir. by Hettie Macdonald
- Best professional editor, short form: Gordon Van Gelder
- Best professional editor, long form: David G. Hartwell
- Best professional artist: Stephan Martiniere
- Best semiprozine: Locus, ed. by Charles N. Brown
- Best fanzine: File 770, ed. by Mike Glyer
- Best fan writer: John Scalzi
- Best fan artist: Brad Foster

=== Nebulas ===
- Best novel: Powers, by Ursula K. Le Guin
- Best novella: The Spacetime Pool, by Catherine Asaro
- Best novelette: "Pride and Prometheus", by John Kessel
- Best short story: "Trophy Wives", by Nina Kiriki Hoffman
- Best script: WALL-E, by Andrew Stanton, Pete Docter and Jim Reardon

=== Other awards ===
- BSFA Award for Best Novel: The Night Sessions, by Ken MacLeod
- Locus Award for Best Science Fiction Novel: The Yiddish Policemen's Union, by Michael Chabon
- Saturn Award for Best Science Fiction Film: Cloverfield, dir. by Matt Reeves
