= Colette Darfeuil =

French actress (1906–1998)

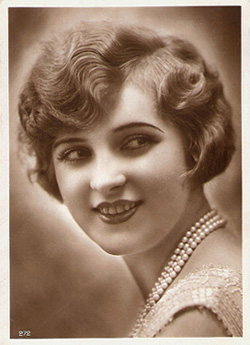
- Promotional headshot
- Born: Emma Henriette Augustine Floquet; 7 February 1906; Paris, French Third Republic
- Died: 15 October 1998 (aged 92); Montfort-l'Amaury, Yvelines, France
- Occupation: Actress
- Years active: 1920–1953
- Spouses: Pierre Weill; Pierre Bianco

Colette Darfeuil (born Emma Henriette Augustine Floquet, 7 February 1906 – 15 October 1998) was a French actress whose film career began at age 14 in 1920 and continued through the early 1950s.

Darfeuil made her screen debut in at age 14 in the 1920 Pierre Colombier-directed silent film Les Étrennes à travers les âges and would work steadily through the silent era and into the sound era.

== Selected filmography ==
- The Flame (1926)
- Sables (1927)
- Paris-New York-Paris (1928)
- What a Woman Dreams of in Springtime (1929)
- The Man Without Love (1929)
- The Prosecutor Hallers (1930)
- Wine Cellars (1930)
- End of the World (1931)
- About an Inquest (1931)
- For an Evening (1931)
- Buridan's Donkey (1932)
- Baroud (1932)
- A Telephone Call (1932)
- That Scoundrel Morin (1932)
- All for Love (1933)
- To Be Loved (1933)
- Le Roi des Champs-Élysées (1934)
- My Heart Is Calling You (1934)
- The Darling of His Concierge (1934)
- Casanova (1934)
- Mam'zelle Spahi (1934)
- The House on the Dune (1934)
- Thirteen Days of Love (1935)
- The Flame (1936)
- Michel Strogoff (1936)
- On the Road (1936)
- School for Journalists (1936)
- Monsieur Bégonia (1937)
- The Beauty of Montparnasse (1937)
- Grey's Thirteenth Investigation (1937)
- Tamara (1938)
- Chéri-Bibi (1938)
- Prince of My Heart (1938)
- The Patriot (1938)
- Case of Conscience (1939)
- The Spirit of Sidi-Brahim (1939)
- The Suitors Club (1941)
- Forces occultes (1943)
- The Stairs Without End (1943)
- The Misfortunes of Sophie (1946)
- Memories Are Not for Sale (1948)
- The Ferret (1950)
- Death Threat (1950)
- Bibi Fricotin (1950)
- The Girl with the Whip (1952)
- This Age Without Pity (1952)
