= Ray Donn =

English entrepreneur and businessman-turned-actor (born 1937)

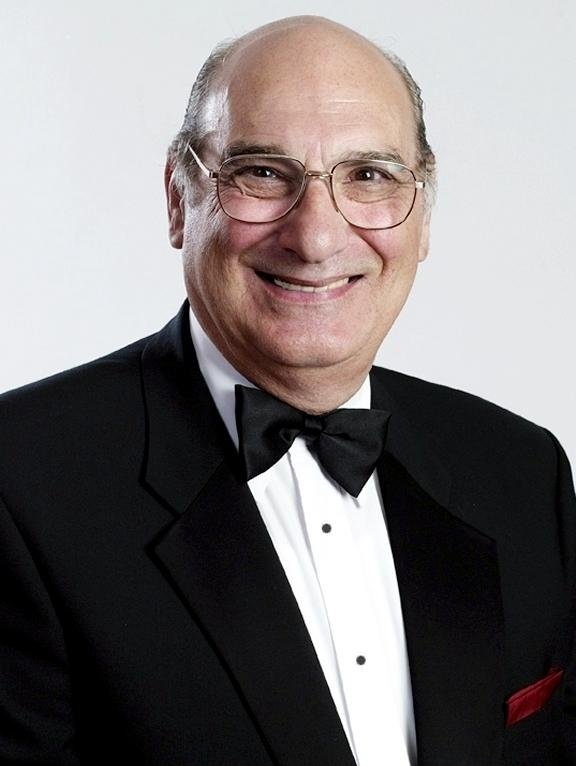
- Born: Raphael Siratsky; 7 August 1937 (age 88); Poplar, London, England
- Occupations: Businessman; background actor
- Years active: Business: 1961–1997; Acting: 1997–present
- Spouse: Patricia Ann Donn (m. 1959)
- Children: 2
- Website: Official website

Ray Donn (7 August 1937, in Poplar, East London, England) was an English entrepreneur and businessman-turned-actor.

Raphael Siratsky (Ray Donn) born London's East End 7 August 1937 eldest of four children his single mother Rose Siratsky (aka Donn) 1906–1979 (Seamstress) born Wapping 26 October 1906. Mothers parents, Israel (1878–1933) & Hilda Siratsky (1885–1950) Jewish/Polish emigrants (1905), they had 8 children (6 girls 2 boys) & settled in Upper North Street Poplar East London trading as a barber.

== Businessman ==
Donn began his professional life in 1961 and spent 36 years running pubs, clubs and hotels, such as the Pegasus from 1961 to 1968, the Goat from 1968 to 1970, the Valley Club from 1970 to 1984, and Syndale Park Motel from 1984 to 1997.

In addition, from 1970 to 1985, he directed Ray Donn (Leisure) Ltd. as an entertainment and management agency, booking artists for clubs, theatre and TV clients, with clients at the time including Jim Bowen and Bobby Davro.

From 1966 to 1980 he produced and directed the annual Publand Variety Show featuring the top performers from pub and club entertainment, presenting the show at major London theatres and concluding at the London Palladium. Proceeds from the shows going to the Entertainment Artistes' Benevolent Fund.

== Service ==
Donn served on the management committee of the Entertainment Artistes' Benevolent Fund for 35 years from 1974 to 2009. The fund provides and maintains Brinsworth House as a residential home for retired members of the entertainment profession and/or their dependents. Brinsworth House is itself supported by income from the proceeds of the annual Royal Variety Performance and other fund-raising events. Donn has been presented to the Queen, the Queen Mother and Prince Charles on numerous occasions in the capacity of Honorable Treasurer for the fund, a position he held for the 13 years from 1995 to 2008.

Ray Donn was initiated into Chelsea Lodge No.3098 on 19 September 1997, and installed as 100th Master, May 2004.

He was also a founder member and first secretary of the Comedians' Golfing Society from 1978 to 1984, and since 1997 has been Honorary Treasurer of the Vaudeville Golfing Society, a fraternity of professional entertainers.

2011 Hon.Member Concert Artistes Association

== Acting ==
Donn took early retirement from the trade in 1997 and began a new career as a film extra (or supporting artist). His first appearance was in the film Notting Hill. Since then he has appeared in many films and television productions, as well as a David Suchet (Hercule Poirot) body double.

== Partial filmography ==
Donn has had a large number of uncredited roles in both film and episodic television. Credited roles include:

=== As David Suchet stunt double ===
- NCS: Manhunt (7 episodes 2001–02) (TV)
- Henry VIII (2003) (TV)
- Agatha Christie's Poirot (8 episodes, 2003–06) (TV)
- Flood (2007)

=== Television ===
- Oliver Twist (1 episode, 1999)
- The Vice (1 episode, 2000)
- Randall & Hopkirk (1 episode, 2000)
- The Bill (1 episode, 2000)
- Smack the Pony (1 episode, 2000)
- Burnside (2 episodes, 2000)
- My Family (1 episode, 2000)
- Close & True (1 episode, 2000)
- Perfect Strangers (2001) (Series)
- Dream Team (1 episode, 2001)
- Night and Day (1 episode, 2001)
- The American Embassy (1 episode, 2002)
- The Jury (2002) (Mini-series)
- London's Burning (1 episode, 2002)
- Ultimate Force (1 episode, 2002)
- Tipping the Velvet (2002) (Mini-series)
- Bodily Harm (1 episode, 2002)
- The League of Gentlemen (1 episode, 2002)
- Judge John Deed (1 episode, 2002)
- 15 Storeys High (1 episode, 2002)
- Family (2003) (Mini-series)
- Two Thousand Acres of Sky (1 episode, 2003)
- Trust (1 episode, 2003)
- Mile High (1 episode, 2003)
- Murphy's Law (1 episode, 2003)
- Family Affairs (1 episode, 2003)
- Canterbury Tales (1 episode, 2003)
- Footballers' Wives (1 episode, 2004)
- The Brief (1 episode, 2004)
- The Long Firm (2004) (Series)
- The Grid (1 episode, 2004)
- MI-5 (1 episode, 2004)
- Down to Earth (1 episode, 2005)
- Life Begins (1 episode, 2005)
- Hustle (1 episode, 2005)
- Silent Witness (1 episode, 2005)
- EastEnders (1 episode, 2005)
- Waking the Dead (1 episode, 2005)
- Hotel Babylon (1 episode, 2006)
- Bombshell (1 episode, 2006)
- Bad Girls (1 episode, 2006)
- Tittybangbang (3 episodes, 2006)
- Katy Brand's Big Ass Show (2007) (Series)
- Party Animals (1 episode, 2007)
- M.I.High (1 episode, 2007)
- Holby Blue (1 episode, 2007)
- Harley Street (1 episode, 2008)

== See also ==
- Charlton Athletic F.C.
