= Georges Berr =

French actor, film director and screenwriter

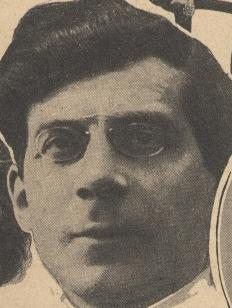
- Born: 30 July 1867; 3rd arrondissement of Paris
- Died: 21 July 1942 (aged 74); Paris
- Occupations: Dramatist, actor

Georges Berr (30 July 1867 – 21 July 1942) in Paris, was a French actor and dramatist, a member and sociétaire of the Comédie-Française from 1886 to 1923.

Under the pseudonyms Colias and Henry Bott he wrote several plays, particularly in collaboration with Louis Verneuil. He was Jean-Pierre Aumont's maternal great-uncle.

== Plays ==
Partial list of plays written or cowritten by Berr.

- L'Amant de Madame Vidal
- La Pomme by Verneuil and Berr
- L'École des contribuables
- 1900: Moins cinq... by Paul Gavault and Berr, Théâtre du Palais-Royal
- 1901: L'Inconnue by Gavault and Berr, Théâtre du Palais-Royal
- 1901: Madame Flirt by Gavault and Berr, Théâtre de l'Athénée
- 1902: Les Aventures du capitaine Corcoran by Gavault, Berr and Adrien Vély, Théâtre du Châtelet
- 1902: La Carotte by Berr, Paul Dehere and Marcel Guillemaud, Théâtre du Palais-Royal
- 1904: La Dette by Gavault and Berr, Théâtre de l'Odéon
- 1905: Les Merlereau, 3 acts comedy, Théâtre des Bouffes Parisiens
- 1905: La Marche forcée by Berr and Marc Sonal, Théâtre du Palais-Royal
- 1913: Un jeune homme qui se tue, 4 acts comedy, Théâtre Femina
- 1914: J'ose pas, 3 acts comedy, Théâtre du Palais-Royal
- 1922: Dom Juan de Molière, Comédie-Française
- 1925: Azaïs by Louis Verneuil and Berr
- 1928: Le passage de Vénus, 3 acts comedie-bouffe, Théâtre Sarah-Bernhardt
- 1930: Miss France by Berr and Verneui, Théâtre Édouard VII
- 1930: Guignol, un cambrioleur by Berr and Verneuil, Théâtre de la Potinière
- 1934: Mon crime de Georges Berr and Verneuil, Théâtre des Variétés
- 1935: Les Fontaines lumineuses by Berr and Verneuil, Théâtre des Variétés
- 1937: The Train for Venice by Louis Verneuil and Berr, Théâtre Saint-Georges
- 1946: Azaïs, 3 acts comedy by Verneuil and Berr, Théâtre Daunou

== Filmography ==
=== Actor ===
- 1910: Le Barbier de Séville: Figaro

=== Director ===
- 1909: L'Enfant prodigue, script by Henri Lavedan, with Eugène Silvain
- 1909: Les Précieuses ridicules, after Molière, with Béatrix Dussane

=== Writer ===
- The Million (Silent film, 1914, based on Le Million)
- The Frisky Mrs. Johnson (Silent film, 1920, based on Madame Flirt)
- La principessa Bebè (Silent film, 1921, based on Princesse Bébé)
- The World at Her Feet (Silent film, 1927, based on Maître Bolbec and son mari)
- My Sister and I (Silent film, 1929, based on Ma sœur et moi)
- Burglars (German, 1930, based on Guignol, le cambrioleur)
  - Flagrant Délit (French, 1931, based on Guignol, le cambrioleur)
- Le Million (French, 1931, based on Le Million)
- My Cousin from Warsaw (French, 1931, based on Ma cousine de Varsovie)
  - My Cousin from Warsaw (German, 1931, based on Ma cousine de Varsovie)
- Un coup de téléphone (French, 1932, based on Un coup de téléphone)
- Azaïs (French, 1932, based on Azaïs)
- Just My Luck (1933, based on Azaïs)
- Ihre Durchlaucht, die Verkäuferin (German, 1933, based on Ma sœur et moi)
  - Caprice de princesse (French, 1934, based on Ma sœur et moi)
- Chourinette (French, 1934, original screenplay)
- The Bread Peddler (French, 1934, dialogue)
- Arlette and Her Fathers (French, 1934, based on Avril)
- L'École des contribuables (French, 1934, based on L'École des contribuables)
- Maître Bolbec et son mari (French, 1934, based on Maître Bolbec et son mari)
- Le Bossu (French, 1934, dialogue)
- Ferdinand the Roisterer (French, 1935, dialogue)
- Speak to Me of Love (French, 1935, based on Parlez-moi d'amour)
- The Squadron's Baby (French, 1935, dialogue)
- The Lover of Madame Vidal (French, 1936, based on L'amant de Madame Vidal)
- Un scandale aux Galeries (French, 1937, dialogue)
- True Confession (1937, based on Mon Crime)
- The Train for Venice (French, 1938, based on Le train pour Venise)
- My Life with Caroline (1941, based on Le train pour Venise)
- Mischievous Susana (Spanish, 1945, based on Ma sœur et moi)
- Cross My Heart (1946, based on Mon Crime)
- Ma tante d'Honfleur (French, 1949, based on Ma tante d'Honfleur)
- Canas al aire (Spanish, 1949, based on L'amant de Madame Vidal)
- My Sister and I (Swedish, 1950, based on Ma sœur et moi)
- Cosas de mujer (Spanish, 1951, based on Maître Bolbec and son mari)
- The Passage of Venus (French, 1951, based on Le Passage de Vénus)
- My Sister and I (German, 1954, based on Ma sœur et moi)

== Career at the Comédie-Française ==
- Admitted at the Comédie-Française in 1886
- Sociétaire from 1893 to 1923
- 326th sociétaire
- Honorary sociétaire in 1923
- 1891: Thermidor by Victorien Sardou
- 1897: Mieux vaut douceur et violence by Édouard Pailleron
- 1899: Le Torrent by Maurice Donnay
- 1899: La Conscience de l'enfant by Gaston Devore
- 1902: La Grammaire by Eugène Labiche and Alphonse Jolly
- 1902: La Petite Amie by Eugène Brieux
- 1903: Business is business by Octave Mirbeau
- 1904: Le Paon by Francis de Croisset
- 1905: Don Quichotte by Jean Richepin after Miguel de Cervantes
- 1905: Il était une bergère by André Rivoire
- 1906: Les Plaideurs by Racine
- 1907: Marion de Lorme by Victor Hugo
- 1907: L'Amour veille by Robert de Flers and Gaston Arman de Caillavet
- 1908: Le Bon Roi Dagobert by André Rivoire
- 1912: Le Mariage forcé by Molière
- 1913: La Marche nuptiale by Henry Bataille
- 1915: Le Mariage forcé by Molière
- 1920: L'Amour médecin by Molière
- 1920: The Imaginary Cuckold by Molière
- 1921: Le Sicilien ou l'Amour peintre by Molière
- 1921: Les Fâcheux by Molière
- 1922: Dom Juan by Molière
- 1922: Remerciement au roi by Molière]
- 1922: L'Amour veille by Gaston Arman de Caillavet and Robert de Flers
- 1923: Le Dépit amoureux by Molière
- 1924: Les Trois Sultanes by Charles-Simon Favart
