= The Train for Venice =

The Train for Venice may refer to:

- The Train for Venice (play), a 1937 comedy play by Georges Berr and Louis Verneuil
- The Train for Venice (film), a 1938 French comedy film, based on the play
