= Elvira Popescu =

Romanian-French actress (1894–1993)

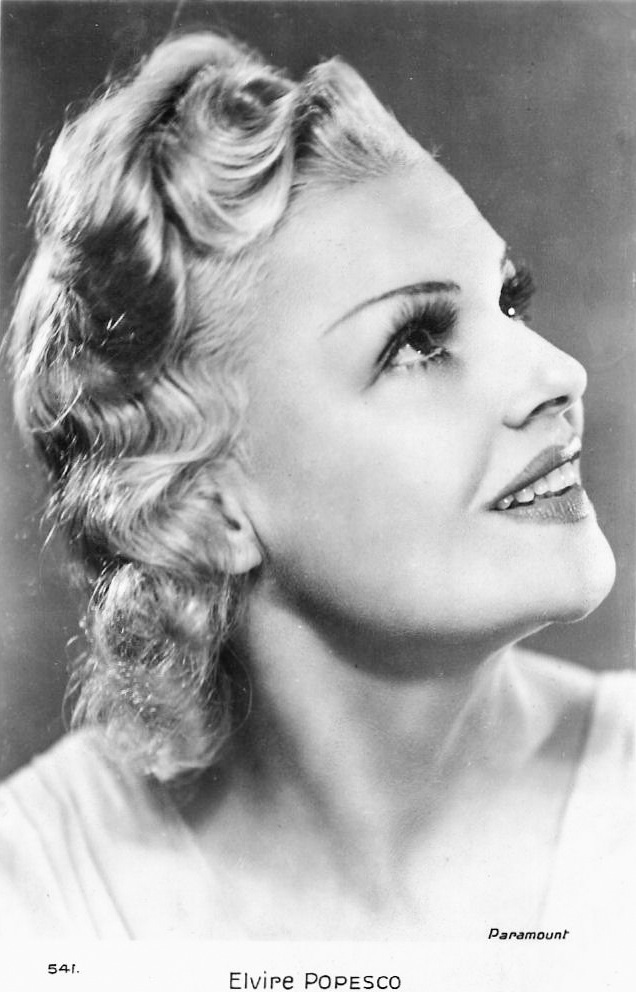
- Elvire Popesco by Paramount
- Born: Elvira Popescu; 10 May 1894; Bucharest, Romania
- Died: 11 December 1993 (aged 99); Paris, France
- Resting place: Père Lachaise Cemetery
- Education: Music and Drama Conservatory
- Years active: 1910–1978
- Spouse(s): Aurel Athanasescu; Ion Manolescu-Strunga; Maximilien Sébastien Foy

Elvira Popescu (Romanian pronunciation: [elˈvira poˈpesku]; in French, Elvire Popesco; 10 May 1894 – 11 December 1993) was a Romanian-French stage and film actress and theatre director. During the 1930s and 1940s, she starred in a number of French comedy films.

== Life and career ==
Popescu was born in Bucharest, and studied drama at the Music and Drama Conservatory in her native city, under the guidance of Constantin Nottara and Aristizza Romanescu. In 1911 Grigore Brezeanu was making the first Romanian films to deal with fiction. He employed Popesco as well as other leading actors like Nottara and Romanescu. The first two films were called "Fatal Love" and "Spin a Yarn". No copies are known of these films. Popesco made her debut at the National Theatre Bucharest at age 16. In 1912, she played herself in the movie Independența României, directed by Aristide Demetriade.

In 1919 she became artistic director of the Excelsior Theatre. In 1921, Popescu started Teatrul Mic, which she managed in parallel with the Excelsior. In 1923, she starred in the movie Țigăncușa de la iatac, directed by Alfred Halm.

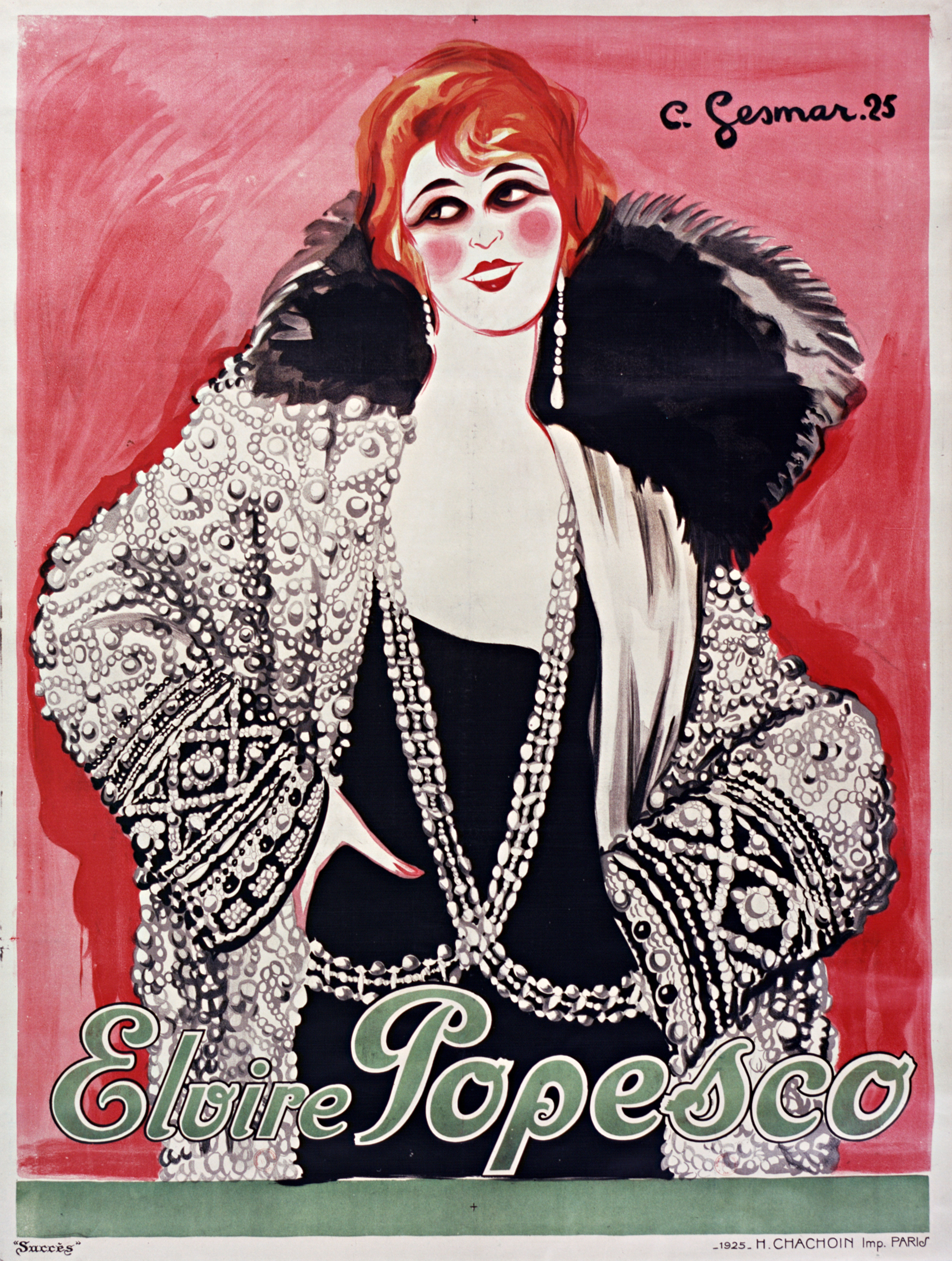
Elvire Popesco painting by Charles Gesmar (1925)

At the urging of Louis Verneuil, the French playwright, Popescu moved in 1924 to Paris. Under Verneuil's direction, she played the leading role in Ma Cousine de Varsovie, at the Théâtre Michel (1923). She also played in Tovaritch (1933), La Machine infernale (1954), Nina (1949), and La Mamma (1957). Later on, she was director of Théâtre de Paris (1956–1965), and Théâtre Marigny (1965–1978). At age 84, she played again in La Mamma.

Elvira Popescu also played in movies, such as La Présidente (Fernand Rivers, 1938), Tricoche et Cacolet (Pierre Colombier, 1938), Ils étaient neuf célibataires (Sacha Guitry, 1939), Paradis perdu (Abel Gance, 1940), Austerlitz (Abel Gance, 1960), and Purple Noon (René Clément, 1960).

== Personal life ==
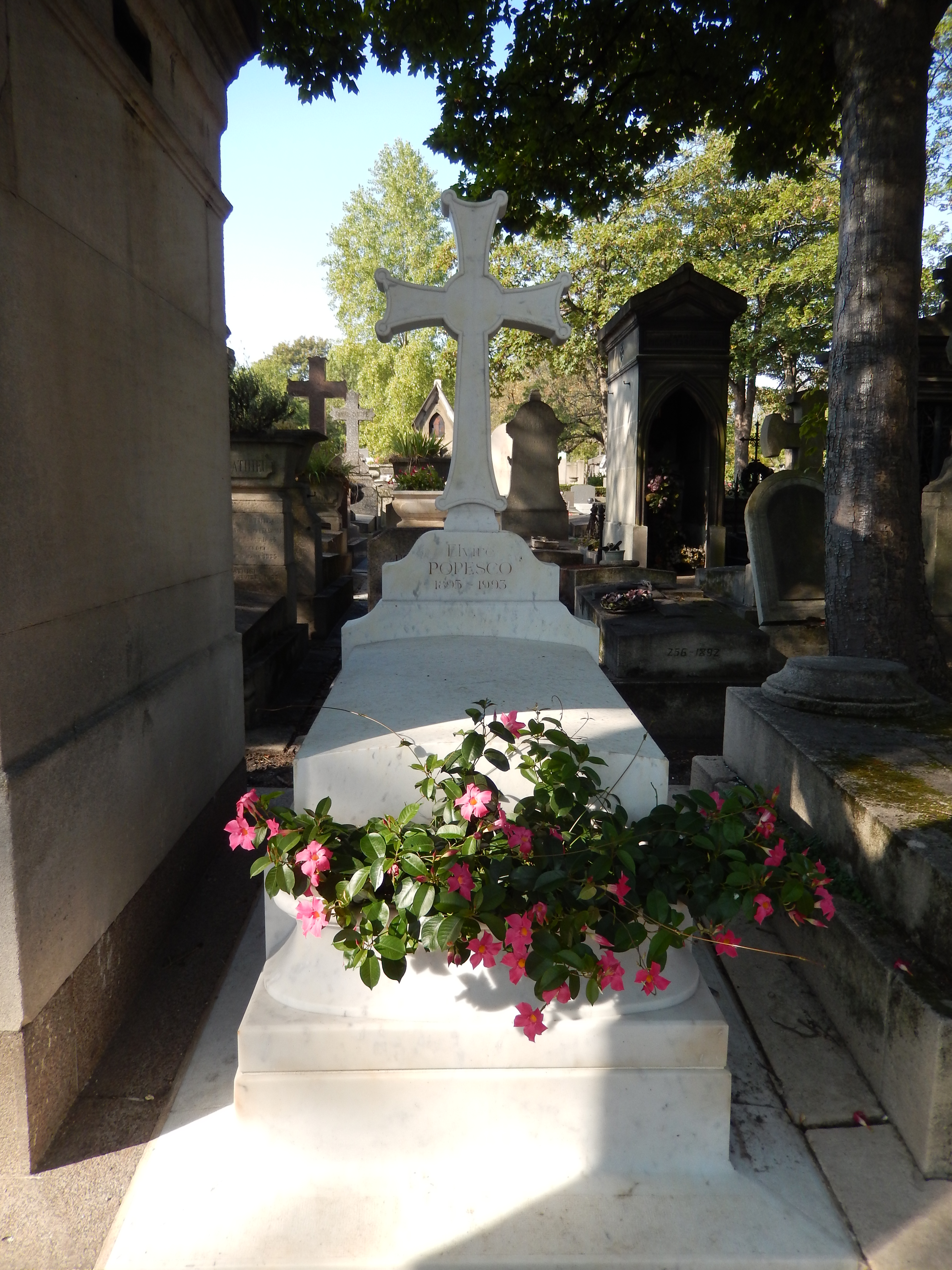
Grave of Elvire Popescu at Père Lachaise Cemetery

Shortly after her debut in 1910, Popescu married comedian Aurel Athanasescu and they had a daughter named Tatiana. After a few years, she divorced, and married Ion Manolescu-Strunga, Minister of Industry and Commerce (who was to die in Sighet Prison in the 1950s). Her third husband was Count Maximilien Sébastien Foy (born in Paris on 17 April 1900, died in Neuilly-sur-Seine on 11 November 1967).

She died in Paris at age 97, and was interred at Père Lachaise Cemetery.

== Honours ==
Villa Paul Poiret, April 2005

- In 1987, Elvira Popescu received the first honorary Molière Award for career achievements.
- In 1989, President François Mitterrand conferred upon her the Légion d’honneur.

== Legacy ==
- While married to Manolescu-Strunga, she lived in a house not far from the University of Bucharest. The house, built on a 1,224 m^{2} (13,180 sq ft) lot, has 22 rooms, spread over 500 m^{2} (5,400 sq ft) of living area; it was put on the market in 2005 for around 2 million Euros.
- From 1930 to 1985, Elvira Popescu lived in a villa in Mézy-sur-Seine, Yvelines. The villa, acquired from fashion designer Paul Poiret, and remodelled in 1932 by architect Paul Boyer, was declared a historic monument in 1984, but it has since decayed. Bought for 1.8 million French francs in 1999, it is open occasionally to the public.
- Together with Elena Văcărescu, Anna de Noailles, and Marthe Bibesco, Elvira Popescu is considered to be the inspiration for Henri Matisse's painting, La Blouse Roumaine (1940).

== Partial filmography ==
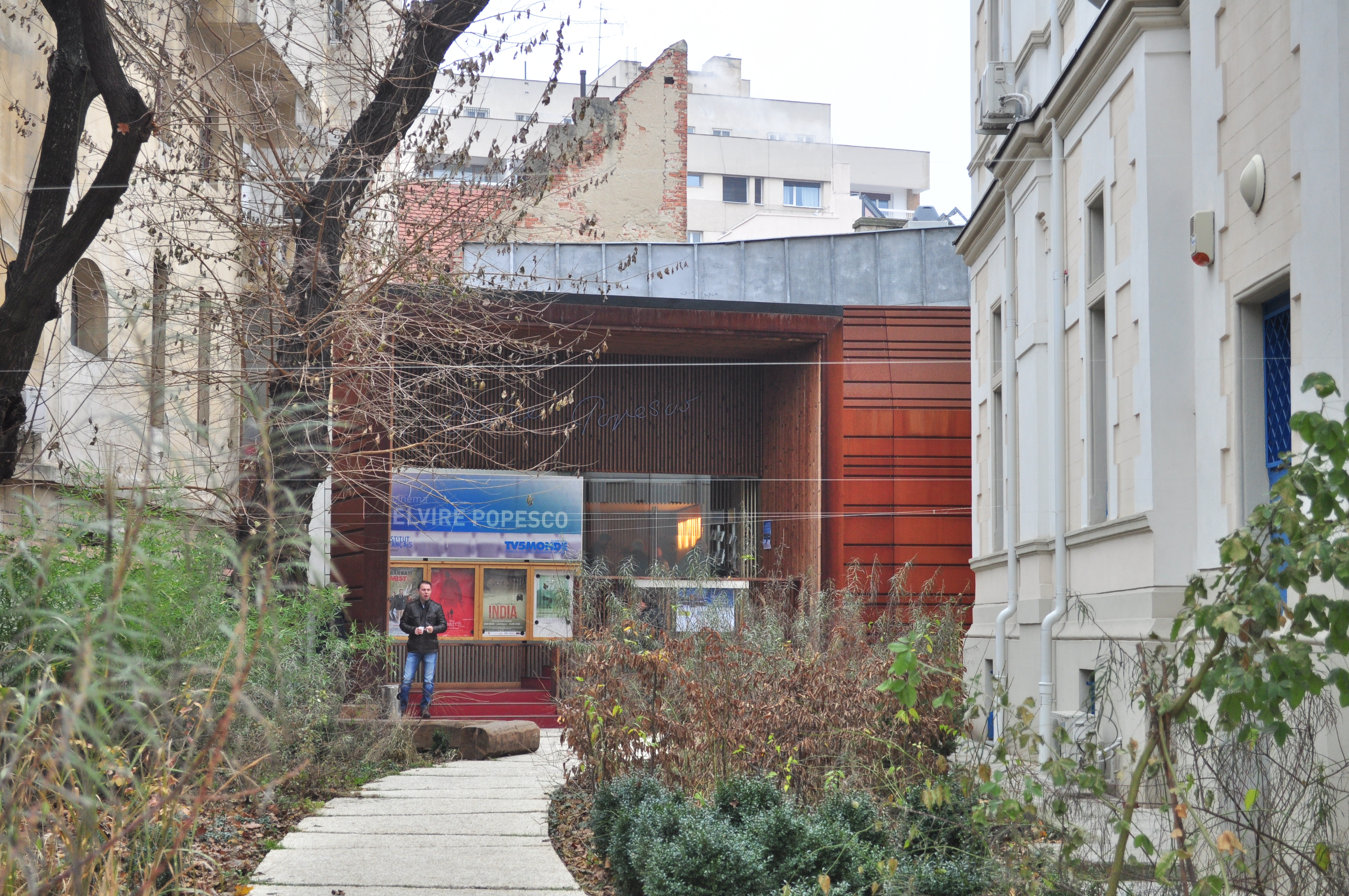
The cinema Sala Elvire Popescu at the Institut Français de Roumanie in Bucharest is named in Popescu's honor

- The Independence of Romania (1912) - Țăranca
- Țigăncușa dela iatac (1923) - Maria Tortusanu -Basil's fiancée
- The Foreigner (1931) - Dora Clarkson
- My Cousin from Warsaw (1931) - Sonia Varilovna
- His Best Client (1932) - Edwige
- Une femme chipée (1934) - Hélène Larsonnier
- Dora Nelson (1935) - Dora Nelson et Suzanne Verdier
- The Lover of Madame Vidal (1936) - Catherine Vidal
- The King (1936) - Thérèse Marnix - une actrice célèbre
- The Man of the Hour (1937) - Mona Thalia
- The House Opposite (1937) - Madame Anna
- The Club of Aristocrats (1937) - La comtesse Irène Waldapowska
- The Green Jacket (1937) - La duchesse de Maulévrier
- In Venice, One Night (1937) - Nadia Mortal
- The President (1938) - Vérotcha
- Tricoche and Cacolet (1938) - Bernardine Van der Pouf
- Education of a Prince (1938) - La reine de Silistrie
- My Priest Among the Rich (1938) - Lisette Cousinet
- Deputy Eusèbe (1939) - Mariska
- The Fatted Calf (1939) - Madame Rameau
- Sacred Woods (1939) - La princesse Dorothée
- Nine Bachelors (1939) - Comtesse Stacia Batchefskaïa
- Behind the Facade (1939) - Francine Margerie
- Paradise Lost (1940) - Sonia Vorochine
- The Mondesir Heir (1940) - Erika Axelos
- Parade en 7 nuits (1941) - Madame Fanny
- The Master Valet (1941) - Antonia - une effervescente étrangère
- The Golden Age (1942) - Véra Termutzki
- Mademoiselle Swing (1942) - Sofia de Vinci
- The Blue Veil (1942) - Mona Lorenza
- Frederica (1942) - Frédérica
- Madly in Love (1943) - Arabella
- Purple Noon (1960) - Mrs. Popova
- Austerlitz (1960) - Laetitia Bonaparte
