= Théâtre Saint-Georges =

Theatre in Paris, France

Coordinates: 48.8782°N 2.3372°E

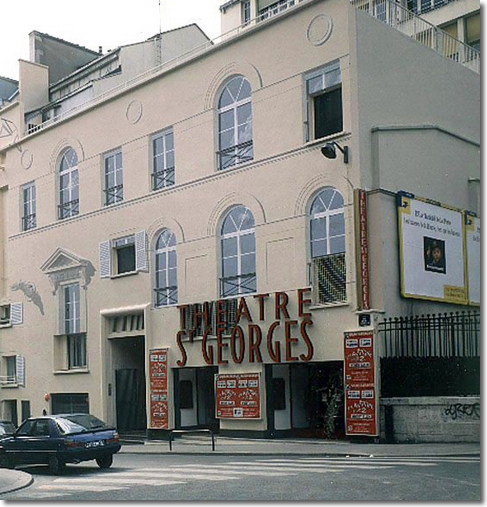

The Théâtre Saint-Georges (French pronunciation: [teɑtʁ sɛ̃ ʒɔʁʒ]) is a theatre in the French capital Paris, located on the Rue Saint-Georges from which it takes its name. Designed by the architect Charles Siclis, it was constructed on the site of a former mansion and opened in 1929. Originally it was managed by Camille Choisy, before he handed it over to Benoît-Léon Deutsch who successfully staged Boulevard comedies during the 1930s including Georges Berr and Louis Verneuil's The Train for Venice.

== Bibliography ==
- Pride, Leo Bryan. International Theatre Directory: A World Directory of the Theatre and Performing Arts. Simon and Schuster, 1973.
- Stoddard, Richard . Theatre and Cinema Architecture: A Guide to Information Sources. Gale Research Company, 1978.
