= With a Smile (film) =

1936 film

- Directed by: Maurice Tourneur
- Written by: Louis Verneuil
- Produced by: José Marquis
- Starring: Maurice Chevalier; Marie Glory; André Lefaur
- Cinematography: Armand Thirard; Louis Née
- Edited by: Harold Earle
- Music by: Marcel Lattès; Charles Borel-Clerc
- Production company: Les Films Marquise
- Distributed by: Métropole Distribution
- Release date: 4 December 1936
- Running time: 98 minutes
- Country: France
- Language: French

With a Smile (French: Avec le sourire) is a 1936 French comedy film directed by Maurice Tourneur and based on an original screenplay by Louis Verneuil. The film stars Maurice Chevalier and the title of the film is taken from one of his comic songs "With a Smile" (Avec le Sourire, 1907).

It was shot at the Joinville Studios in Paris. The film's sets were designed by the art directors Lucien Carré and Émile Duquesne.

== Plot ==
A smooth talking but penniless vagrant (Maurice Chevalier) arrives in Paris and sets out to make it to the top with nothing more than his smile, charm and cunning mind.

== Cast ==
- Maurice Chevalier as Victor Larnois
- Marie Glory as Gisèle Berthier
- André Lefaur as Ernest Villary, le propriétaire du "Palace"
- Paule Andral as Valentine Villary, son épouse
- Marcel Vallée as Pascaud
- Léon Arvel as Templier
- Marcel Simon as Fromentel, le directeur des Beaux-Arts
- Rivers Cadet as Albert, le chasseur du "Palace"
- Nicole de Rouves as l'épouse d'Albert
- Léon Morton as le maître d'école
- Milly Mathis as la caissière du "Palace"
- Jean Gobet as Bruzin
- Henri Houry as l'entraîneur
- Viviane Gosset as Suzy Dorfeuil, la vedette du "Palace"
- Lucien Callamand as Vauclin
- Jean Aymé as le duc de Ganges
- Anthony Gildès as le baron Wurtz
- Simone Sandre as la dactylo
- Georges Bever as le valet de pied
- Vincent Hyspa as le président du tribunal
- Robert Ozanne as un invité à la noce
- Georgé as Genneval
- Léon Morton as le maître d'école
- Robert Ozanne as un invité à la noce
- Rivers Cadet as le chasseur
- Eugène Stuber as l'amant de la femme du chasseur
- Jean Témerson as Cam
