= Olive Young =

Olive Young may refer to:

- Olive Young (company), South Korean health and beauty store chain
- Olive Young (actress) (1903–1940), Chinese-American actress, singer, and film director
- Olive Young (1897–1922), only victim of the English murderer Ronald True

== See also ==
- Olive Yang (1927–2017), Burmese opium warlord
- Oliver Young (1855–1908), Royal Navy officer and politician
