= Victor Boucher =

French actor (1877–1942)

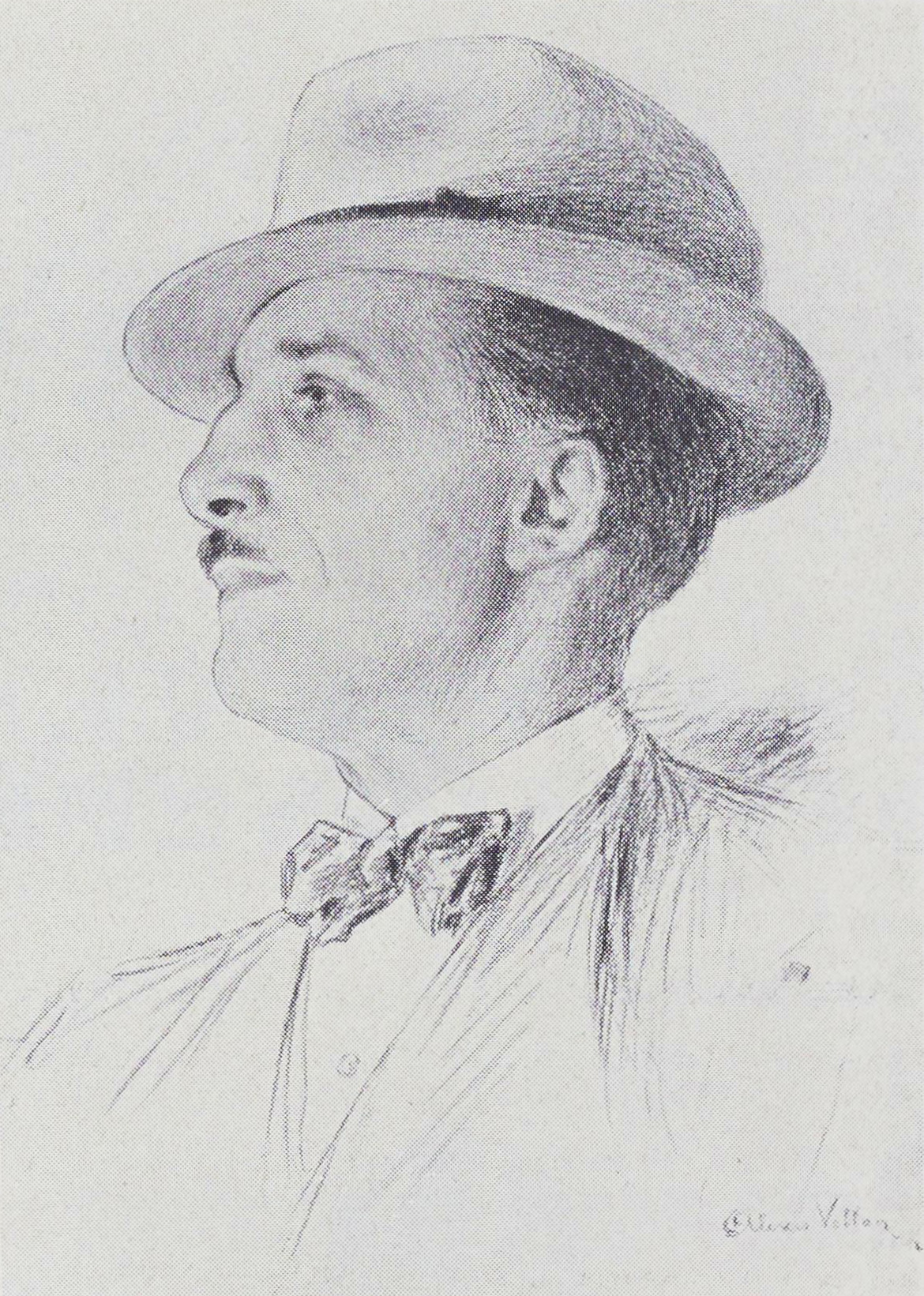
Portrait of Victor Boucher by Alexis Vollon.

Victor Louis Armand Boucher (24 August 1877 – 21 February 1942) was a French actor.

== Biography ==
Victor Boucher was born, on 24 August 1877, in Rouen, in a house on the rue Saint-Étienne-des-Tonneliers. His parents had a café-restaurant in Bihorel. Educated at the école Bellefonds in Rouen, he began acting in youth groups.

He worked as an accountant in Rouen. After his military service, he moved to Paris. He married Mariotta Claire in Neufchâtel-en-Bray in 1902. He had the luck, one day, to replace a sick actor in the Théâtre des Mathurins in Paris, and made a name for himself with his comic performance based on his stammering.

In 1927, he became a director of the Théâtre de la Michodière in Paris. He was president of the Association des artistes dramatiques.

He died in Ville-d'Avray, on 21 February 1942, from a heart attack.

== Filmography ==
Source: IMDb

- La petite chocolatière (1913)
- L'idée de Françoise (1914)
- La douceur d'aimer (English release: The Sweetness of Loving) (1930)
- Gagne ta vie (1931)
- Les vignes du seigneur (English release: Our Lord's Vineyard) (1932)
- Le sexe faible (English release: The Weaker Sex) (1933)
- Votre sourire (1934)
- La banque Nemo (English release: Nemo's Bank) (1934)
- Bichon (1935)
- Faisons un rêve (English: Let's Make a Dream) (1936)
- L'amant de Madame Vidal (English release: The Lover of Madame Vidal (1936)
- L'habit vert (English release: The Green Jacket) (1937)
- Chipée (1937)
- Le train pour Venise (English release: The Train for Venice) (1938)
- Ils étaient neuf célibataires (English release: Nine Bachelors) (1939)
- Le bois sacré (English release: Sacred Woods) (1939)
- Parade en sept nuits (1941)
- Ce n'est pas moi (1941)
