= The Sweetness of Loving =

1930 film

- Directed by: René Hervil
- Written by: Albert Dieudonné (novel); René Hervil; Pierre Maudru
- Produced by: Jacques Haïk
- Starring: Victor Boucher; Renée Devillers; Henri Bosc
- Cinematography: Willy Faktorovitch
- Music by: Casimir Oberfeld; Vincent Scotto; Henri Verdun
- Production company: Les Établissements Jacques Haïk
- Distributed by: Les Établissements Jacques Haïk
- Release date: 17 October 1930
- Running time: 101 minutes
- Country: France
- Language: French

The Sweetness of Loving (French: La douceur d'aimer) is a 1930 French comedy film directed by René Hervil and starring Victor Boucher, Renée Devillers and Henri Bosc.

== Cast ==
- Victor Boucher as Albert Dumontier
- Renée Devillers as Germaine
- Henri Bosc as Robert-Henri
- Alice Roberts as Ruzy Valbreuse
- Thérèse Dorny as Lorette
- Simone Bourday as Simone
- Arletty as Une dactylo
- Alexandre Mihalesco
- René Bergeron
- Willy Leardy
- Ray De Verly
- Jean Diéner
- Hubert Daix

== Bibliography ==
- Rège, Philippe. Encyclopedia of French Film Directors, Volume 1. Scarecrow Press, 2009.
