= Speak to Me of Love (1935 film) =

- Directed by: René Guissart
- Written by: Georges Berr (play); Louis Verneuil (play); Paul Schiller
- Produced by: Jacques Roitfeld
- Starring: Roger Tréville; Germaine Aussey; Paule Andral
- Cinematography: Charles Bauer; Enzo Riccioni
- Music by: Armand Bernard; Jean Lenoir
- Production company: Flores Film
- Distributed by: Les Films Paramount
- Release date: 4 October 1935
- Country: France
- Language: French

Speak to Me of Love (French: Parlez-moi d'amour) is a 1935 French comedy film directed by René Guissart and starring Roger Tréville, Germaine Aussey and Paule Andral.

The film's sets were designed by the art directors Henri Ménessier and René Renoux.

== Partial cast ==
- Roger Tréville
- Germaine Aussey
- Paule Andral
- Julien Carette as Wolff
- Jean Debucourt as Raymond Valtier
- Suzanne Henri
- Jane Loury
- Elise Maillé
- Paul Pauley as Le duc de Rocheterre

== Bibliography ==
- Dayna Oscherwitz & MaryEllen Higgins. The A to Z of French Cinema. Scarecrow Press, 2009.
