= Jean Témerson =

French actor

- Born: 12 June 1898; Paris, France
- Died: 9 August 1956 (aged 58); Paris, France
- Occupation: Actor
- Years active: 1937–1954

Jean Témerson (1898–1956) was a French actor.

== Selected filmography ==
- The Lover of Madame Vidal (1936) - Guillaume - le domestique
- With a Smile (1936) - Cam (uncredited)
- Pépé le Moko (1937) - Gravère
- Blanchette (1937)
- Chaste Susanne (1937) - Firmin, le domestique
- La chaste Suzanne (1937) - Alexis
- Boulot the Aviator (1937)
- The Messenger (1937) - Le maître d'hôtel (uncredited)
- The Alibi (1937) - Jojo, l'ami de Dany
- Le gagnant (1937)
- The Two Schemers (1938) - Ernest - le larbin
- Ramuntcho (1938) - Salaberry
- Barnabé (1938) - Firmin
- Alert in the Mediterranean (1938) - Le docteur Laurent
- La Piste du sud (1938) - Chailloux
- Education of a Prince (1938) - Hector, le valet de chambre
- The Rebel (1938) - Blotaque
- Prince of My Heart (1938) - Tsoupoff - le chambellan
- The Chess Player (1938) - Stanislas, le roi de Pologne
- Captain Benoit (1938) - Tripoff, le touriste
- Quand le coeur chante (1938)
- Raphaël le tatoué (1939) - Monsieur Chromo
- Les gangsters du château d'If (1939) - Papalouche
- The Five Cents of Lavarede (1939) - Tartinovitch
- Mon oncle et mon curé (1939) - Le chauffeur
- Berlingot and Company (1939) - Donadieu - un homme aux idées bien arrêtées
- Monsieur Brotonneau (1939) - L'huissier
- Sacred Woods (1939) - L'huissier
- Personal Column (1939) - L'inspecteur Batol
- The Blue Danube (1940) - Alexander
- President Haudecoeur (1940) - Capet
- Monsieur Hector (1940) - Le Baron Grondin
- Volpone (1941) - Voltore
- Soyez les bienvenus (1942)
- The Misfortunes of Sophie (1946) - Le policier Moucheron
- Une femme coupée en morceaux (1946)
- That's Not the Way to Die (1946) - Le commissaire
- The Faceless Enemy (1946) - Hector / Le valet / Hector - the butler
- Rooster Heart (1946) - Stanislas Pugilaskoff
- Cargaison clandestine (1947)
- Si jeunesse savait... (1948) - Fred
- Une mort sans importance (1948) - Arthur / Arthur II
- The Cupboard Was Bare (1948) - Le deuxième habitué
- Fantomas Against Fantomas (1949) - Le président du consortium du marché noir
- Manon (1949) - Wikipedia Le portier du 'Magic'
- Miquette (1950) - Saint-Giron
- Dominique (1950)
- Here Is the Beauty (1950) - Théophile
- Without Trumpet or Drum (1950)
- The Atomic Monsieur Placido (1950) - Un maître d'hôtel
- Véronique (1950) - Me Corbin
- Blonde (1950) - Le valet
- Le gang des tractions-arrière (1950)
- Coq en pâte (1951)
- The Cape of Hope (1951) - Docteur Pagolos
- The Count of Monte Cristo (1954) - Le roi Louis XVIII (1)
- Queen Margot (1954) - Xavier Noblet
- Flesh and the Woman (1954) - L'aubergiste de 'La belle étoile'
- Les Diaboliques (1955) - Le garçon d'hôtel (final film role)
