= The Western Whirlwind =

1927 film directed by Albert S. Rogell

- Directed by: Albert S. Rogell
- Screenplay by: Harrison Jacobs
- Story by: Albert S. Rogell
- Starring: Jack Hoxie; Margaret Quimby; Claude Payton; Billy Engle; Edith Murgatroyd; Jack Pratt
- Cinematography: William Nobles
- Production company: Universal Pictures
- Distributed by: Universal Pictures
- Release date: February 20, 1927
- Running time: 50 minutes
- Country: United States
- Language: Silent (English intertitles)

The Western Whirlwind is a 1927 American silent Western film directed by Albert S. Rogell and written by Harrison Jacobs. The film stars Jack Hoxie, Margaret Quimby, Claude Payton, Billy Engle, Edith Murgatroyd and Jack Pratt. The film was released on February 20, 1927, by Universal Pictures.

== Plot ==
As described in a film magazine, Jack Howard, returning to his western home from the war, and learning from his mother that his father, the sheriff, has been killed by an unknown assailant, gets the mayor of Gold Strike to swear him in as sheriff, and he resolves to avenge his father and bring the murderer to justice. However, he is hooted and jeered by the thugs of Gold Strike, headed by Jeff Taylor, whose business is unknown but is always flush with money, and who has just spread a tale of Jack's cowardice in the war. Jack's mother pleads with him for his safety and exacts from him the promise that he will never expose himself to danger, for her sake. He keeps the promise and is bullied and despised as a coward by the townspeople. The gang becomes more insolent, committing depredations and robberies with no interference from the sheriff. Finally the bank is robbed by Taylor, who leaves behind him a glove belonging to Jack. The town posse sets out to get Jack. The fleeing bandits break into Jack's house and ransack it while his mother calls vainly for help. In the meantime Taylor has tricked Jack's girlfriend Molly into going with him to a mountain shack, where he proposes marriage and attempts to force his affection on her. Jack returns to his house and finds it in chaos. Securing from his mother a release from his promise, he pursues the bandits to their mountain lair, which he has discovered during his layoff from duty, and bests them in a fight. From one of them he forces the confession that Taylor fired the shot that killed his father and also that Taylor was at this moment abducting Molly. Leaving his dog, Rex, to watch the captives. Jack rides after the racing buckboard in which Taylor is making for the border with the young woman. Leaping from his horse to the wagon, he drags Taylor to the ground and knocks him out. The buckboard races on with Molly, who has lost the reins. Jack, following jumps from his saddle to the backs of the runaways and rides them, Roman style, to a stop. The gang is arrested and Jack is again a topper, knowing no boss but Molly, who has knocked him for a row of wedding bells.

== Cast ==
- Jack Hoxie as Jack Howard
- Margaret Quimby as Molly Turner
- Claude Payton as Jeff Taylor
- Billy Engle as 'Beans' Baker
- Edith Murgatroyd as Mrs. Martha Howard
- Jack Pratt as Jim Blake

== Preservation ==
With no prints of The Western Whirlwind located in any film archives, it is a lost film.
