= Sacred Woods =

1939 film

- Directed by: Léon Mathot
- Written by: Robert de Flers (play); Gaston Arman de Caillavet (play); Carlo Rim
- Produced by: Fernand Weill; Lucien Weill
- Starring: Elvire Popesco; Gaby Morlay; Victor Boucher
- Cinematography: Nicolas Hayer
- Edited by: Marguerite Beaugé
- Music by: Marceau Van Hoorebecke
- Production company: Bervia Films
- Distributed by: Les Distributeurs Associés
- Release date: 26 November 1939
- Running time: 80 minutes
- Country: France
- Language: French

Sacred Woods (French: Le bois sacré) is a 1939 French comedy film directed by Léon Mathot and starring Elvire Popesco, Gaby Morlay and Victor Boucher. It was based on a play by Robert de Flers and Gaston Arman de Caillavet which had previously been made into a 1915 Italian film by Carmine Gallone. The film's sets were designed by the art director Robert Gys.

== Cast ==
- Elvire Popesco as Francine Margerie
- Gaby Morlay as Adrienne Champmorel
- Victor Boucher as Paul Margerie
- André Lefaur as Monsieur Champmorel
- Marcel Dalio as Zakouskine, le danseur
- Armand Bernard as Monsieur des Fargottes
- Jean Témerson as L'huissier
- Marie-Jacqueline Chantal
- Germaine Charley
- Eddy Debray
- Gustave Gallet
- Suzanne Henri
- Marcel Lamy
- Léon Larive
- France Marion
- Georges Paulais
- Marcel Rouzé
- Jacques Tarride
- Claire Vervin
- Charles Vissières

== Bibliography ==
- Dayna Oscherwitz & MaryEllen Higgins. The A to Z of French Cinema. Scarecrow Press, 2009.
