= Cross My Heart (1946 film) =

1946 film by John Berry

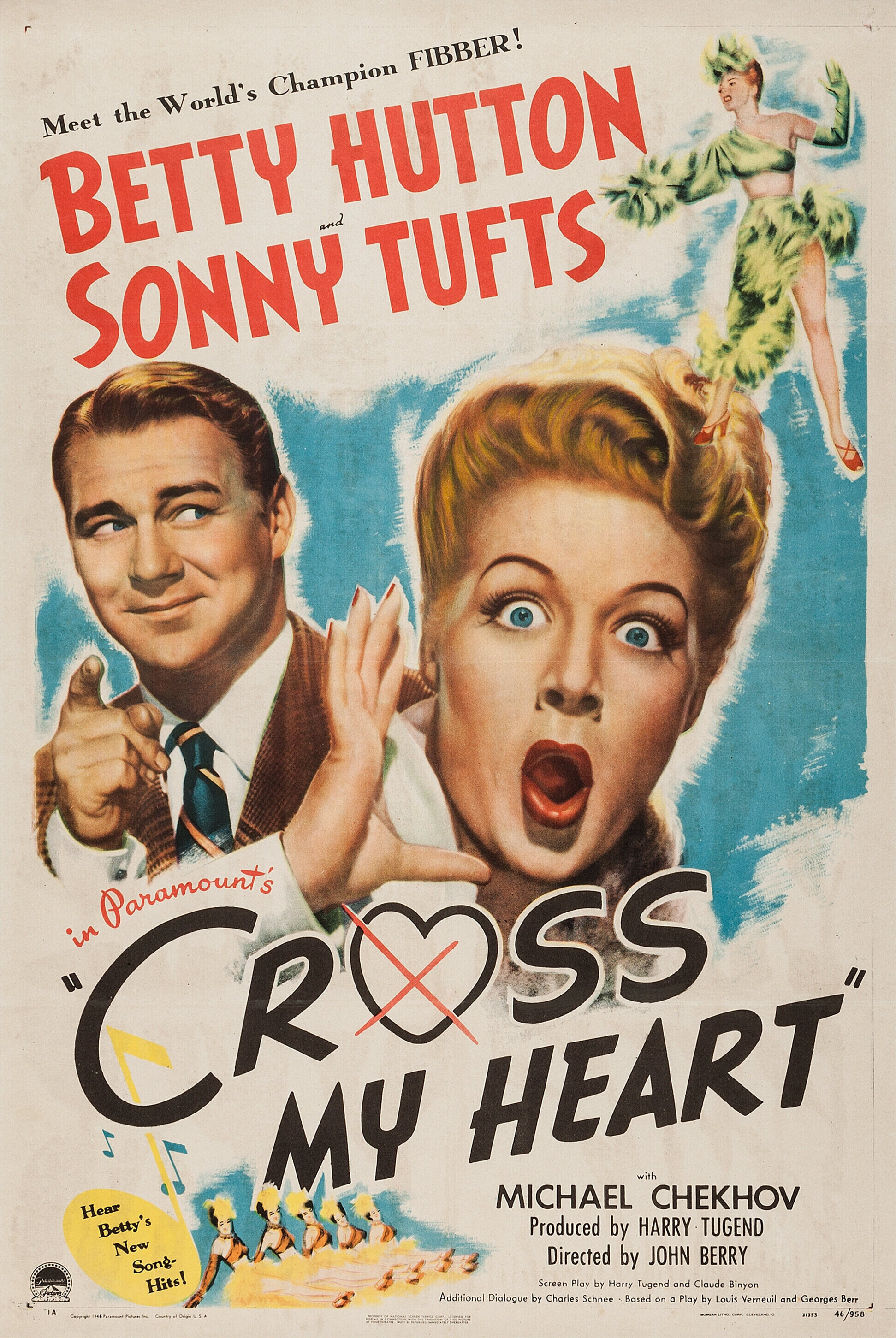
- Theatrical release poster
- Directed by: John Berry
- Written by: Harry Tugend; Claude Binyon; Charles Schnee (additional dialogue)
- Based on: "Mon Crime" by Georges Berr and Louis Verneuil
- Produced by: Harry Tugend
- Starring: Betty Hutton; Sonny Tufts; Michael Chekhov; Ruth Donnelly
- Cinematography: Charles Lang; Stuart Thompson
- Edited by: Ellsworth Hoagland
- Music by: Robert Emmett Dolan; James Van Heusen; Johnny Burke
- Production company: Paramount Pictures
- Distributed by: Paramount Pictures
- Release dates: December 17, 1946 (New York City); January 10, 1947 (United States)
- Running time: 85 minutes
- Country: United States
- Language: English

Cross My Heart is a 1946 American musical comedy film, directed by John Berry. Produced and released by Paramount Pictures, the film stars Betty Hutton and Sonny Tufts, with Michael Chekhov, Ruth Donnelly, Alan Bridge, Iris Adrian, Howard Freeman and Lewis L. Russell. The film's songs were written by Johnny Burke and Jimmy Van Heusen.

The film is a musical remake of the 1937 screwball comedy film True Confession, starring Fred MacMurray and Carol Lombard. Which was itself based on the 1934 French play Mon Crime (English: The Crime Is Mine) written by Georges Berr and Louis Verneuil.

The film's plot centers on a chorus girl called Peggy Harper, played by Hutton, who confesses to murdering her producer so her lawyer fiance, Oliver Clarke, played by Tufts, can defend her in court.

== Plot ==
Chorus girl Peggy Harper plans to quit show business so she can support her fiance Oliver Clark and his new law practice. Despite an offer from her producer, Wallace Brent, for Peggy to be his secretary in exchange for sending business to Oliver, she refuses. Determined to bring Oliver his first client, Peggy organises for Tony Krouch, a man accused of stealing, to be represented by Oliver. But when Tony admits to stealing, Oliver refuses to start off working for a guilty client.

Out of desperation, Peggy agrees to be Wallace’s secretary in exchange for Wallace sending Oliver business. The next morning, Peggy arrives at Wallace’s house where she’s greeted by Peter Dvorchik, an actor. When Wallace arrives Peter begs for the role of Hamlet in Wallace’s upcoming revival of the play, but Wallace refuses and kicks Peter out. Wallace starts pawing at Peggy. In an attempt to distract him, Peggy records herself singing on a record for Wallace, but to no avail so she knocks him out and flees.

Later, Peggy returns to Wallace’s house with her mother Eve to retrieve her purse. The two are stopped by the police and a detective, Flynn, who reveals that Wallace has been murdered. Flynn accuses Peggy of murdering Wallace, an accusation she initially refuses, but Peggy decides to lie about murdering Wallace in self-defense so that Oliver can be her lawyer. Peggy hopes that the renown Oliver gets from defending her will result in his law business becoming a success.

Peggy is imprisoned and prepares to go on trial. In prison, Peggy is confronted by Peter, who reveals he knows Peggy isn’t the murderer. In the courtroom, much to the objection of the prosecutor, Mr. Claude, Peggy reenacts the events of the murder and sings a sentimental song she claims she sang to Wallace, to get sympathy from the jury. Afterwards, Peter appears with the record that Peggy recorded to distract Wallace. The song Peggy actually sung to Wallace is not the song she sung to the jury, jeopardising her lie.

When Oliver hears the record, he becomes infuriated that Peggy lied to him. Oliver gets Peter restrained by the police and gives Eve the record to hide. Oliver tells Peggy that when the trial is over, he is breaking off their engagement. The jury decides that Peggy is not guilty and Oliver breaks off their engagement.

Some time later, Oliver’s law practice is a success and Peggy invites him to the opening of her new nightclub act. Oliver doesn’t attend so Peggy becomes determined to prove her innocence so she can get Oliver back. Detective Flynn and Mr. Claude go backstage to congratulate Peggy on her new act. Peggy gets Eve to retrieve the record and she accidentally plays it to Flynn and Mr. Claude. Peggy reveals to them that she didn’t kill Wallace, causing Flynn to suspect Peter.

Flynn and Mr. Claude bring Peggy to Oliver. Peggy explains the truth to Oliver and he forgives her. Peggy tells Oliver to find Peter while Flynn, Mr. Claude and Peggy go to Wallace’s house to look for evidence that Peter committed the crime. The three find newspaper clippings about how Peter killed two actors in two separate performances of Hamlet.

Oliver finds Peter rehearsing Hamlet by himself. Peter invites Oliver to rehearse with him, which he agrees to. Oliver informs Peggy where Peter is but hangs up before she can tell him about Peter. The three rush to stop Peter from killing Oliver. The three arrive and restrain Peter as he is about to kill Oliver. After an embrace, Peggy promises Oliver that she'll never lie again.

== Cast ==
- Betty Hutton as Peggy Harper
- Sonny Tufts as Oliver Clarke
- Michael Chekhov as Peter Dvorchik
- Ruth Donnelly as Eve Harper
- Al Bridge as Flynn
- Iris Adrian as Sussane Baggart
- Howard Freeman as Wallace "Wally" Brent
- Rhys Williams as Mr. Claude
- Lewis L. Russell as Judge
- Lou Lubin as Tony Krouch (uncredited)
- Mae Busch as Juror (uncredited)
- Catherine Craig as Reporter (uncredited)

== Soundtrack ==
Other than the opening melody, the film's songs were written by songwriting duo Johnny Burke and Jimmy Van Heusen.

- "Cross My Heart" — (Written by Robert Emmett Dolan and Larry Neill)
- "It Hasn't Been Chilly In Chile" — Performed by Betty Hutton
- "Does Baby Feel Alright?" — Performed by Ruth Donnelly
- "How Do You Do It" — Performed by Betty Hutton
- "That Little Dream Got Nowhere" — Performed by Betty Hutton
- "Love Is The Darndest Thing" — Performed by Betty Hutton

That Little Dream Got Nowhere was recorded by several prominent artists including Dinah Shore, of which it gave her a best-seller record, and Bing Crosby.

== Production ==
The film was originally intended to star Hutton, Tufts and Barry Fitzgerald. Filming took place from December, 1944 to March, 1945.

== Release and reception ==
The film premiered at the Paramount Theatre on December 17th, 1946 and was opened by The Andrews Sisters, Tony Pastor and Les Paul. The film had its nationwide release on January 10, 1947.

Bosley Crowther of The New York Times wrote that, "The farcical tribulations of a little lady who is prone to tell fibs and who is promised, by a most convenient irony, to a young lawyer of the staunchest honesty comprise the scattered substance of Paramount's "Cross My Heart" ... Expect little more than Miss Hutton playing her usual cuckoo role and a few flighty scenes (and lines of dialogue) which hold the makings of modified laughs. For the writers, Harry Tugend and Claude Binyon, didn't kill themselves on it."

Variety wrote at the time that, "Cross My Heart is a fragment which Betty Hutton and Sonny Tufts, along with an energetic supporting cast, will have to carry. It's acceptable if not socko film fare, innocuous in its tongue-in-cheek playing. With which audiences will have to go along for best results. If they take it straight—as some of the provincial fans may be inclined, it will have trouble."

Writing for The New Yorker, John McCarten summarised the film as: "Cross My Heart, in which Betty Hutton plays a young lady who confesses to a murder in order to give her boyfriend, a lawyer, a chance to star in court, was a better film all round when it was called “True Confession" and had Carole Lombard to keep things sprightly."

== Bibliography ==
- Fetrow, Alan G. Feature films, 1950-1959: a United States Filmography. McFarland & Company, 1999.
