= The Rebel (1931 film) =

1931 film

- Directed by: Adelqui Migliar
- Based on: "The General" (Hungarian: A tábornok) by Lajos Zilahy
- Starring: Suzy Vernon, Thomy Bourdelle, Paule Andral, Pierre Batcheff, Henry Prestat, Frédéric Mariotti, André Rehan, Jeanne Brazine, Georges La Cressonnière
- Release date: 1931
- Country: France
- Language: French

The Rebel (French: Le rebelle) is a 1931 French drama film directed by Adelqui Migliar and starring Suzy Vernon, Thomy Bourdelle and Paule Andral. The film is based on the 1928 play The General (Hungarian: A tábornok) by Lajos Zilahy.

The film is the French-language version of The Virtuous Sin (1930).

== Cast ==
- Suzy Vernon - Maria Ivanovna
- Thomy Bourdelle - General Platoff
- Paule Andral - Alexandra
- Pierre Batcheff - Lt. Boris Sabline
- Henry Prestat - Un jeune Général
- Frédéric Mariotti - L'ordonnance
- André Rehan - Spoliansky
- Jeanne Brazine - La Chanreuse
- Georges La Cressonnière - Le lieutenant Glinka

== Bibliography ==
- Powrie, Phil & Rebillard, Éric. Pierre Batcheff and stardom in 1920s French cinema. Edinburgh University Press, 2009
