= The World at Her Feet =

1927 film by Luther Reed

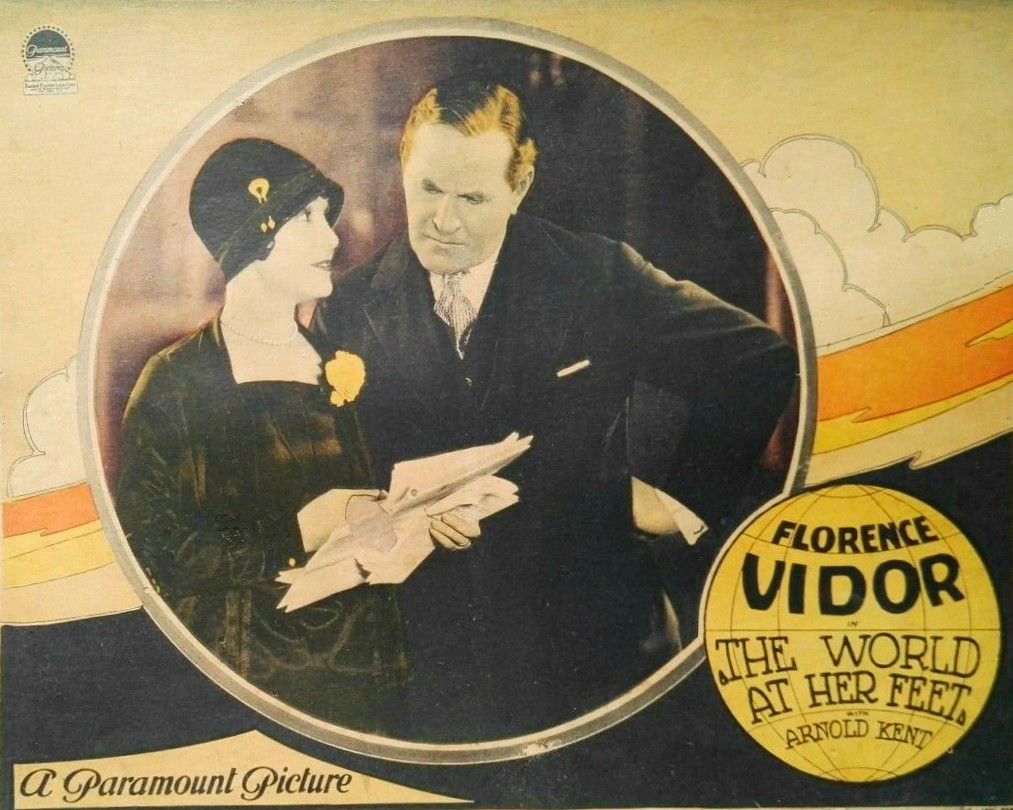
- Lobby card
- Directed by: Luther Reed
- Written by: Louise Long; Doris Anderson; George Marion Jr. (titles)
- Based on: Maitre Bolbec et son mari by Georges Berr and Louis Verneuil
- Produced by: Adolph Zukor; Jesse Lasky
- Starring: Florence Vidor; Arnold Kent; Margaret Quimby
- Cinematography: Harry Fischbeck
- Distributed by: Paramount Pictures
- Release date: May 14, 1927
- Running time: 6 reels
- Country: United States
- Language: Silent (English intertitles)

The World at Her Feet is a 1927 American silent film comedy directed by Luther Reed and starring Florence Vidor. It was produced by the Paramount Lasky Corporation.

== Cast ==
- Florence Vidor as Jane Randall
- Arnold Kent as Richard Randall
- Margaret Quimby as Alma Pauls
- Richard Tucker as Dr. H.G. Pauls
- William Austin as Detective Hall
- David Torrence as Client

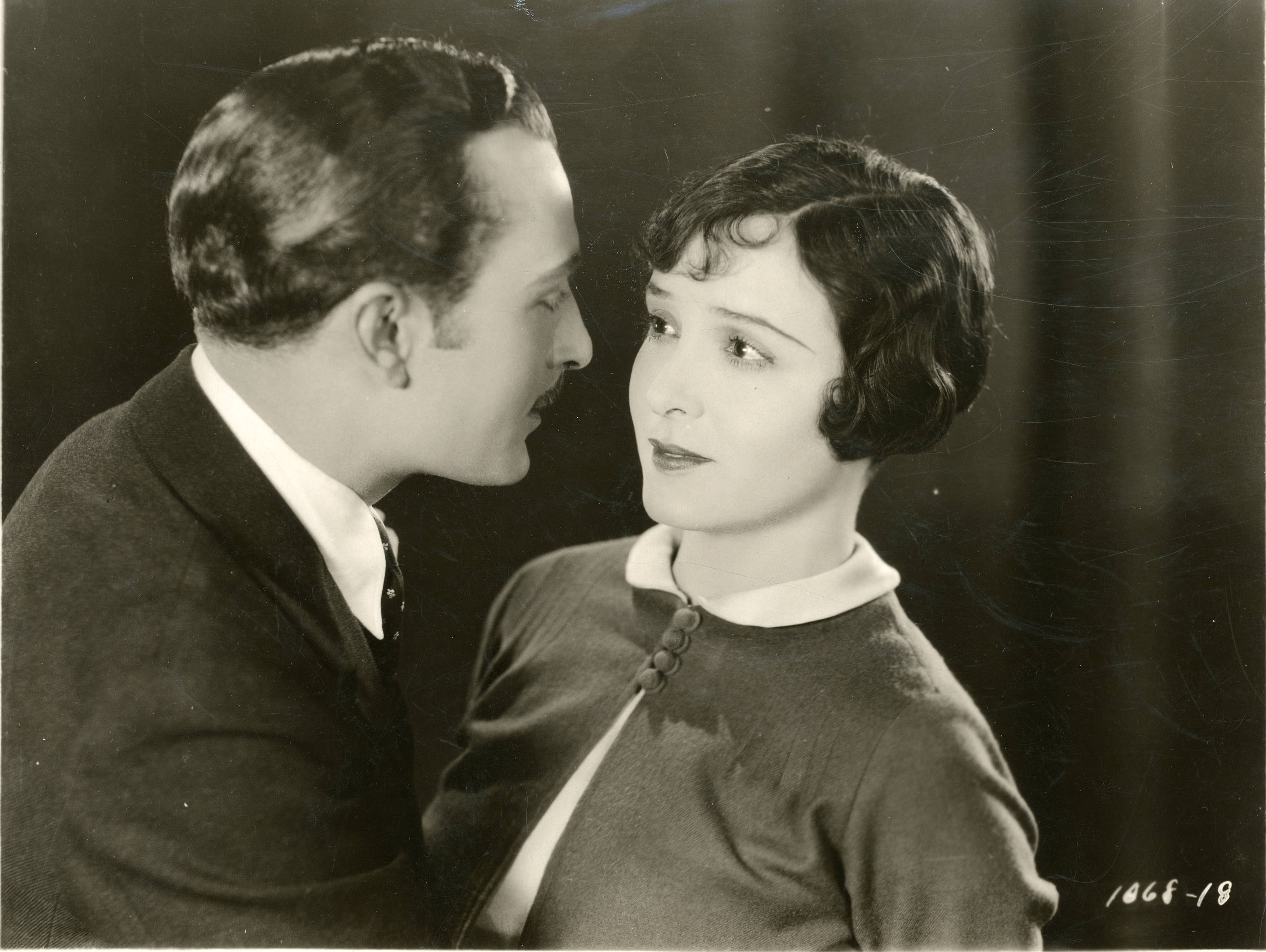
Still with Florence Vidor and Arnold Kent

== Preservation ==
With no prints of The World at Her Feet located in any film archives, it is a lost film.
