= My Life with Caroline =

1941 film by Lewis Milestone

- Theatrical poster
- Directed by: Lewis Milestone
- Screenplay by: John Van Druten; Arnold Belgard
- Based on: The Train for Venice; 1935 play by Louis Verneuil and Georges Berr
- Produced by: Lewis Milestone; Ronald Colman; William Hawks
- Starring: Ronald Colman; Anna Lee; Charles Winninger; Reginald Gardiner; Gilbert Roland
- Cinematography: Victor Milner
- Edited by: Henry Berman
- Music by: Werner R. Heymann
- Production companies: United Producers Corp; RKO Radio Pictures
- Distributed by: RKO Radio Pictures
- Release date: August 1, 1941
- Running time: 81 minutes
- Country: United States
- Language: English
- Budget: $503,000
- Box office: $830,000

My Life with Caroline is a 1941 American comedy film directed by Lewis Milestone and starring Ronald Colman and Anna Lee, in her second Hollywood film and her first in a starring role. The supporting cast featured Charles Winninger, Reginald Gardiner and Gilbert Roland. The screenplay was written by John Van Druten and Arnold Belgard.

== Plot ==
Ditsy socialite Caroline, is married to wealthy publisher Anthony Mason.

While alone at a charity ball in Alpine Lodge, Idaho, Caroline flirts with Paco Del Valle, who wants to marry her. Paco asks her father Mr. Bliss for permission to marry his daughter. Bliss tells them that they need to ask her husband, and Caroline and Paco telegraph Anthony in New York.

As Caroline and Paco await an eastbound plane at the airport, Mason arrives. Seeing the two together, Mason recalls a nearly identical situation that occurred two years earlier when Caroline was enamored with sculptor Paul Martindale in Palm Beach, Florida.

== Cast ==
- Ronald Colman as Anthony Mason
- Anna Lee as Caroline Mason
- Charles Winninger as Mr. Bliss
- Reginald Gardiner as Paul Martindale
- Gilbert Roland as Paco Del Valle
- Kay Leslie as Helen
- Hugh O'Connell as Muirhead
- Murray Alper as Jenkins
- Matt Moore as Walters

== Background ==
In 1940, William Hawks (brother of film director Howard Hawks), along with Ronald Colman, Charles Boyer, Irene Dunne, Lewis Milestone and Anatole Litvak, founded United Producers Corporation. The company intended to make 10 films for RKO, and My Life with Caroline was the first of five that were to star Colman.

The film's screenplay was written by John Van Druten and Arnold Belgard, adapted from Louis Verneuil's film The Train for Venice, which was based upon the play The Train for Venice, written by Verneuil and Georges Berr.

Milestone had tested actresses Miriam Hopkins, Paulette Goddard and Jean Arthur for the role of Caroline but decided on Anna Lee after seeing her in the British film Young Man's Fancy. My Life With Caroline was Lee's Hollywood debut in a starring role.

The film's sets were designed by the art director Nicolai Remisoff.

== Reception ==
In a contemporary review for The New York Times, critic Bosley Crowther wrote: "Mr. Colman locks with Mr. Gardiner in what is supposed to be a battle of wits, and thus until the end of the picture they merely pummel one another with flat gags. There must be some logical explanation why Lewis Milestone, who, after all, is no fool, should put his usually fine directorial hand to a story as vapid as this. There must be some further explanation why Mr. Colman, Mr. Gardiner and Miss Lee, who are all of them competent performers, should be wasted on such obvious frippery. But it's too much for our comprehension. Let's just call 'My Life With Caroline' time ill spent, and draw the curtain quietly thereon."

=== Box office ===
The film recorded a loss of $32,000.
