= René Bergeron =

French actor (1890–1971)

- Born: 7 October 1890; Paris, France
- Died: 12 March 1971 (aged 80); Paris, France
- Occupation: Actor
- Years active: 1929-1963 (film)

René Bergeron (7 October 1890 – 12 March 1971) was a French stage and film actor. A character actor he played numerous supporting roles in films, particularly during the 1930s and early 1940s.

== Selected filmography ==
- Captain Fracasse (1929)
- The Sweetness of Loving (1930)
- Make a Living (1931)
- Wooden Crosses (1932)
- Happy Hearts (1932)
- One Night's Song (1933)
- Nemo's Bank (1934)
- At the End of the World (1934)
- Street Without a Name (1934)
- Lucrezia Borgia (1935)
- Dédé (1935)
- The Crew (1935)
- The New Men (1936)
- Forty Little Mothers (1936)
- The Call of Silence (1936)
- The Two Girls (1936)
- Mayerling (1936)
- When Midnight Strikes (1936)
- Nights of Fire (1937)
- The Call of Life (1937)
- Marthe Richard (1937)
- Southern Mail (1937)
- Woman of Malacca (1937)
- Women's Prison (1938)
- Monsieur Coccinelle (1938)
- Alert in the Mediterranean (1938)
- Princess Tarakanova (1938)
- Abused Confidence (1938)
- The Lafarge Case (1938)
- Alexis, Gentleman Chauffeur (1938)
- The New Rich (1938)
- The Path of Honour (1939)
- Deputy Eusèbe (1939)
- Coral Reefs (1939)
- Montmartre (1941)
- Monsieur La Souris (1942)
- The Woman I Loved Most (1942)
- The Benefactor (1942)
- The Man from London (1943)
- Death on the Run (1954)
- The Hotshot (1955)
- Irresistible Catherine (1957)
- Le insaziabili (1958)
- And Your Sister? (1958)

== Bibliography ==
- Crisp, Colin. French Cinema—A Critical Filmography: Volume 1, 1929–1939. Indiana University Press, 2015.
- Oscherwitz, Dayna & Higgins, MaryEllen . The A to Z of French Cinema. Scarecrow Press, 2009.
