= Volpone (film) =

1941 French film

- Directed by: Maurice Tourneur; Jacques de Baroncelli
- Written by: Jules Romains
- Based on: Volpone by Ben Jonson
- Produced by: Elisabeth Soutzo
- Starring: Harry Baur; Louis Jouvet; Jean Témerson
- Cinematography: Armand Thirard
- Edited by: Marcel Cravenne
- Music by: Marcel Delannoy
- Production company: Île de France Film
- Distributed by: Union Française de Production Cinématographique
- Release date: 10 May 1941
- Running time: 94 minutes
- Country: France
- Language: French

Volpone is a 1941 French historical comedy film directed by Maurice Tourneur and Jacques de Baroncelli and starring Harry Baur, Louis Jouvet and Jean Témerson. It is based on the Jacobean play Volpone by English writer Ben Jonson. Jacques de Baroncelli began shooting the film in 1938 but due to funding issues production was halted. Tourneur later took over the direction and completed the film for its release. It was shot at the Billancourt Studios in Paris. The film's sets were designed by the art director André Barsacq while the costumes were created by Boris Bilinsky.

== Cast ==
- Harry Baur as Volpone
- Louis Jouvet as Mosca
- Charles Dullin as Corbaccio
- Jean Témerson as Voltore
- Fernand Ledoux as Corvino
- Jacqueline Delubac as Colomba Corvino
- Marion Dorian as Canina
- Alexandre Rignault as Le capitaine Leone Corbaccio
- Louis Frémont as Le juge
- Robert Seller as Le chef des sbires
- Jean Lambert as Le chanteur
- Pierre Giannotti as Le donneur de sérénade
- Colette Régis as La marquise

== Bibliography ==
- Bessy, Maurice & Chirat, Raymond. Histoire du cinéma français: encyclopédie des films, 1940–1950. Pygmalion, 1986
- Rège, Philippe. Encyclopedia of French Film Directors, Volume 1. Scarecrow Press, 2009.
- Waldman, Harry. Maurice Tourneur: The Life and Films. McFarland, 2001.
