= Ion Manolescu-Strunga =

Romanian politician (1889–1951)

Ion N. Manolescu-Strunga (12 May 1889 in Strunga, Iași County, Romania – 19 April 1951 in Sighetu Marmației, Romania) was a Romanian liberal politician.

He studied economics in Vienna and afterwards obtained his doctor's degree at the University of Berlin. He was undersecretary of the Ministry of Agriculture in 1933–1934, and again in 1936. He also was Minister of Industry and Commerce from 5 October 1934 to 1 August 1935 and Minister, secretary of state from 17 November 1937 to 28 December 1937.

Under the communist regime he was arrested on 6 May 1950. He was sentenced to 2 years of hard labor and sent to the Sighet Prison, where he died on 19 April 1951.

His first wife was actress Elvira Popescu. After his death, his second wife, Irina Manolescu-Strunga (née Filotti), was arrested on 15 April 1952; sentenced to two years, she was detained at Dumbrăveni and Văcărești prisons, and liberated on 30 November 1953. Their daughter, Gina, had a child with the journalist N. D. Cocea.
