= The Green Jacket =

1937 film

- Directed by: Roger Richebé
- Written by: Gaston Arman de Caillavet (play); Robert de Flers (play); Louis Verneuil
- Produced by: Roger Richebé
- Starring: Elvire Popesco; Victor Boucher; Jules Berry
- Cinematography: Jean Isnard
- Edited by: Jean Mamy
- Music by: Marcel Lattès
- Production company: Films Roger Richebé
- Distributed by: Gaumont
- Release date: 28 October 1937
- Running time: 109 minutes
- Country: France
- Language: French

The Green Jacket (French: L'habit vert) is a 1937 French comedy film directed by Roger Richebé and starring Elvire Popesco, Victor Boucher and Jules Berry. It is based on a play by Gaston Arman de Caillavet and Robert de Flers. The film's sets were designed by the art director Jean d'Eaubonne.

The film is a farce set against the backdrop of the Académie française.

== Cast ==
- Elvire Popesco as La duchesse de Maulévrier
- Victor Boucher as Le comte Hubert de Latour-Latour
- Jules Berry as Parmeline
- André Lefaur as Le duc de Maulévrier
- Pierre Larquey as Pinchet - le secrétaire perpétuel de l'Institut
- Meg Lemonnier as Brigitte Touchard - la secrétaire du duc
- Bernard Blier as Le fils Pinchet
- Abel Tarride as Jacques Durand - le nouveau Président de la République
- Robert Seller as Saint-Gobain
- Palau as Le baron Bénin
- Lucette Desmoulins as Arlette Mareuil
- Marie-Jacqueline Chantal as La voyageuse du train
- Léonce Corne as Le tailleur
- Georges Morton as Le général
- Charles Lamy as Gondrecourt - le doyen de l'Académie française
- Georges Pally as Le domestique des Maulévrier
- Léon Arvel as Mourier
- Jacques Beauvais as L'huissier
- Marguerite de Morlaye as Une invitée à l'Élysée
- Eddy Debray as Laurel
- Gustave Gallet as Petit rôle
- Anthony Gildès as Un académicien
- Léone Leduc as Petit rôle
- Robert Ralphy as Un académicien
- Henri Richard as Petit rôle
- Gaston Secrétan as Un académicien

== Bibliography ==
- Forman, Edward. Historical Dictionary of French Theater. Scarecrow Press, 2010.
