= True Confession =

1937 film directed by Wesley Ruggles

- 1937 theatrical poster
- Directed by: Wesley Ruggles
- Screenplay by: Claude Binyon
- Based on: Mon Crime (play) by Georges Berr and Louis Verneuil
- Produced by: Albert Lewin
- Starring: Carole Lombard; Fred MacMurray; John Barrymore
- Cinematography: Ted Tetzlaff
- Edited by: Paul Weatherwax
- Music by: Frederick Hollander
- Production company: Paramount Pictures
- Distributed by: Paramount Pictures
- Release date: December 24, 1937 (US)
- Running time: 85 minutes
- Country: United States
- Language: English

True Confession is a 1937 American screwball comedy film directed by Wesley Ruggles and starring Carole Lombard, Fred MacMurray, and John Barrymore. It was based on the 1934 play Mon Crime, written by Georges Berr and Louis Verneuil. In 1946 it was remade as Cross My Heart.

== Plot ==
Helen Bartlett is married to Ken Bartlett, a lawyer with high principles. She is a fiction "writer" but is not making any progress on her book. It is unclear why, but currently, Ken's criminal law practice is in a slump; still, he refuses to defend anyone whom he knows is guilty. As a matter of pride he also refuses to have his wife take a job. He also demands honesty ... but Helen's habit of lying turns out to be her downfall.

Behind Ken's back, Helen takes a job as a secretary for prominent wealthy businessman Otto Krayler, who offers her a suspiciously high salary when she can't even take dictation or type fast. On her first day in his sumptuous apartment/office, he makes advances. Now clear that this job was about sexual services, Helen fights Krayler off and flees out the door. However, she discovers that she left her hat, coat, and purse behind. Returning with her friend Daisy McClure to retrieve her property, Helen is deciding whether to enter the unlocked front door, when police arrive, having learned of a murder.

Krayler has been killed with theft of money as the suspected motive. Lieutenant Darsey questions Helen whose only concern at this point is that her husband not find out about her taking a job. Riffing off of the scenarios spun by Darsey in trying to implicate her, she spins possible accounts of the murder, discussing how she might have done it, but finally says that she had nothing to do with it. Soon, the money turns out not to be missing after all, but oddly, a gun is found in a search of the Bartlett home and the criminologist (erroneously) declares it fired the 2 bullets that killed the deceased.

Ken represents Helen. In his opinion, with the weapon expert's testimony, the jury would not believe she did not commit the murder, and her only hope is to plead self-defense. He stages an elaborate re-enactment of the crime "committed to preserve the honor of womanhood." During the trial, an obnoxious man, Charles "Charley" Jasper, believes that Helen did not murder Krayler, but will be found guilty.

Ken wins Helen's case, making a name for himself, and Helen goes on to publish a hugely successful autobiography. The couple buy a lavish lakeside home, but now Ken is miserable, as, despite her telling him the truth, he is unconvinced that Helen did not after all commit murder. Then Charley shows up in possession of Krayler's wallet, frustrated that Helen and Ken have become rich while he failed to gain anything for his "masterful" crime. He tries to blackmail the couple into buying the wallet for $30,000 as the price of him keeping quiet about Helen's perjury. Ken isn't buying in, and Charley finally confesses that his brother-in-law was the murderer in the botched robbery. Ken initiates a call to the police and Charley makes a quick exit.

At this point, Ken decides to leave Helen, but she chases after him pleading, and lies once more by saying that she is pregnant, obviously too convenient to be true. Still, with all her faults, Ken loves her, and the idea of a child sounds good. The movie ends on this note of reconciliation.

== Cast ==
- Carole Lombard as Helen Bartlett
- Fred MacMurray as Ken Bartlett
- John Barrymore as Charley Jasper
- Una Merkel as Daisy McClure
- Porter Hall as Prosecutor
- Edgar Kennedy as Darsey
- Lynne Overman as Bartender
- Irving Bacon as the coroner
- Fritz Feld as Krayler's butler
- Richard Carle as Judge
- John T. Murray as Otto Krayler
- Tommy Dugan as Typewriter man
- Hattie McDaniel as Ella (maid)

== Reception ==
Writing for Night and Day in 1937, Graham Greene gave the film a good review, advising readers to enjoy "a quick visit". Greene found the film to be "constructed firmly and satisfactorily on human nature" and asserted that "the picture succeeds in being funny from beginning to end". Greene praised its grounding in realism and concluded that the film was "the best comedy of the year".

== Production Code controversy ==
Hollywood film studios Production Code Administration director Joseph Breen registered a complaint with Paramount Pictures, charging the filmmakers with encouraging a licentious attitude towards the court system. In particular, True Confession was deemed to present perjury (as exhibited by Carole Lombard's character Helen Bartlett), as an evasion of "the processes of law" and of depicting legal scenes that were a "travesty on the courts and the administration of justice." Paramount was given authorization to release True Confession when Will H. Hays, president of the MPPDA, allowed that the overall "farcical" character of the film - a screwball comedy - was sufficient to offset the "flippant portrayal of the courts of justice."
