= Arlette and Her Fathers =

1934 film

- Directed by: Henry Roussel
- Written by: Henry Roussel; Georges Berr and Louis Verneuil
- Based on: Avril by Georges Berr and Louis Verneuil
- Produced by: Bernard Natan; Emile Natan
- Starring: Max Dearly; Jules Berry; Renée Saint-Cyr
- Cinematography: Raymond Agnel
- Music by: Marcel Pollet
- Production company: Pathé-Natan
- Distributed by: Pathé Distribution
- Release date: 7 September 1934
- Running time: 102 minutes
- Country: France
- Language: French

Arlette and Her Fathers (French: Arlette et ses papas) is a 1934 French comedy film directed by Henry Roussel and starring Max Dearly, Jules Berry and Renée Saint-Cyr. It is based on the 1932 play Avril by Georges Berr and Louis Verneuil. It was shot at the Joinvile Studios of Pathé-Natan in Paris. The film's sets were designed by the art directors Lucien Aguettand and Guy de Gastyne.

== Cast ==
- Max Dearly as Mérové
- Jules Berry as Pierre de Pérignon
- Renée Saint-Cyr as Arlette
- Pierre Stéphen as Lecouturier
- Christiane Delyne as Nadine
- Pierre Butin as Amédée Pépin
- Suzanne Dantès as Gabrielle
- Christian Argentin as Le professeur
- Robert Clermont as François
- Lucien Pardies as Victor
- Adrienne Trenkel as L'infirmière

== Bibliography ==
- Bessy, Maurice & Chirat, Raymond. Histoire du cinéma français: 1929-1934. Pygmalion, 1988.
- Crisp, Colin. Genre, Myth and Convention in the French Cinema, 1929-1939. Indiana University Press, 2002.
- Goble, Alan. The Complete Index to Literary Sources in Film. Walter de Gruyter, 1999.
- Willoughby, Bob. The Star Makers: On Set with Hollywood's Greatest Directors. Merrell, 2003.
