= Education of a Prince (1938 film) =

1938 film

- Directed by: Alexander Esway
- Written by: Henri-Georges Clouzot; Paul Madeux; Carlo Rim
- Based on: Education of a Prince by Maurice Donnay
- Produced by: Raymond Borderie
- Starring: Elvire Popesco; Louis Jouvet; André Alerme
- Cinematography: Léonce-Henri Burel
- Edited by: André Versein
- Music by: Manuel Rosenthal
- Production company: Compagnie Industrielle et Commerciale Cinématographique
- Distributed by: Les Films Paramount
- Release date: 7 October 1938
- Running time: 90 minutes
- Country: France
- Language: French

Education of a Prince (French: Éducation de prince) is a 1938 French comedy film directed by Alexander Esway and starring Elvire Popesco, Louis Jouvet and André Alerme. It is based on the 1900 play Education of a Prince by Maurice Donnay which had previously been made into the 1927 silent film of the same title. Screenwriter and future director Henri-Georges Clouzot worked on the script of the remake. It was shot at the Saint-Maurice Studios in Paris and on location around the city. The film's sets were designed by the art director Jean Bijon. It is also known by the alternative title Bargekeeper's Daughter.

== Synopsis ==
The widowed Queen of Silistrie and her young son Prince Sacha lives in impoverished exile in Paris after a revolution in their home country. She scrapes by financially by awarding her various creditors essentially worthless honours and titles. Her son a student, has developed anarchistic ideas and has little interest in monarchy. However the financier Chautard wishes to get his hands on the exclusive rights to the country's large oil reserves. He comes up with the idea of restoring Sacha to his family's lost throne, and hires a man to give the young man "the education of a prince".

== Cast ==
- Elvire Popesco as La reine de Silistrie
- Louis Jouvet as René Cercleux
- André Alerme as Chautard
- Fernand Charpin as Honorat
- Josette Day as Marianne Honorat
- Robert Lynen as Le prince Sacha
- Mireille Perrey as Gisèle Beryl
- Geymond Vital as Le général Braoulitch
- Jean Témerson as Hector, le valet de chambre
- Sylvain Itkine as Le professeur Mehara
- Marcel Barencey as Le général destitué
- Jean Daurand as Le camarade de Marianne
- Georges Douking as Pausanias
- Pierre Ferval as Le maître d'hôtel du Ritz
- Albert Broquin as Le boucher
- Alexandre Mihalesco as Selim
- Marguerite de Morlaye as Une dame de la cour

== Bibliography ==
- Goble, Alan. The Complete Index to Literary Sources in Film. Walter de Gruyter, 1999.
- Lloyd, Christopher. Henri-Georges Clouzot: French Film Directors. Manchester University Press, 2007.
