= My Sister and I (1929 film) =

1929 film directed by Manfred Noa

- Directed by: Manfred Noa
- Written by: Georges Berr (play); Louis Verneuil (play); Friedrich Stein
- Produced by: Henry Blanke
- Starring: Mady Christians; Hans Junkermann; Jack Trevor
- Cinematography: Frederik Fuglsang
- Music by: Pasquale Perris
- Production company: National Film
- Distributed by: National Film
- Release date: 27 August 1929
- Country: Germany
- Languages: Silent; German intertitles

My Sister and I (German: Meine Schwester und ich) is a 1929 German silent comedy film directed by Manfred Noa and starring Mady Christians, Hans Junkermann and Jack Trevor. It was shot at the National Studios in Berlin. The film's art direction was by [erdinand Bellan and Alexander Ferenczy.

The film is a German adaptation of a French play by Louis Verneuil and Georges Berr, Ma sœur et moi. The rights to the film were reportedly difficult to negotiate. The film was praised for Noa's direction.

== Cast ==
- Mady Christians as Prinzessin Margarete von Marquardstein
- Hans Junkermann as Fürst von Marquardstein
- Jack Trevor as Baron Udo von Ebenhausen
- Igo Sym as Dr. Gustav Müller
- Tilla Garden as Irmgard von Pleß
- Charles Puffy as Sebastian Puffinger
- Camilla Spira as Schuh-Molly
- Jakob Tiedtke as Kunde

== Bibliography ==
- Heike Klapdor. Ich bin ein unheilbarer Europäer: Briefe aus dem Exil. Aufbau, 2007.
