= Nemo's Bank =

- Directed by: Marguerite Viel
- Written by: Louis Verneuil (play); Marguerite Viel
- Starring: Victor Boucher; Mona Goya; René Bergeron
- Cinematography: Henri Barreyre; André Thomas
- Music by: Armand Bernard
- Production companies: As-Film; Tobis Film
- Distributed by: Cinélux
- Release date: 27 July 1934
- Running time: 92 minutes
- Country: France
- Language: French

Nemo's Bank (French: La Banque Nemo) is a 1934 French comedy film directed by Marguerite Viel and starring Victor Boucher, Mona Goya and René Bergeron. The film is based on a 1931 play of the same name, but also has strong similarities to the Stavisky Affair which took place the year the film was released.

== Synopsis ==
A man rises from the gutter to become a leading banker. His involvement in dishonest financial dealings threaten the collapse of his empire, but he is rescued by the various politicians who have interests in the firm.

== Main cast ==
- Victor Boucher as Gustave Labrèche
- Mona Goya as Charlotte
- René Bergeron as Émile Larnoy
- Charles Fallot as Nemo
- Henry Bonvallet as Vauquelin
- Guilhon
- Fred Marche as Pignolet
- Georges Pally as Le président
- Gustave Gallet as Biscotte
- Alice Tissot as Mme Nemo

== Bibliography ==
- Hayward, Susan. French National Cinema. Routledge, 2006.
