= Margaret Quimby =

American actress

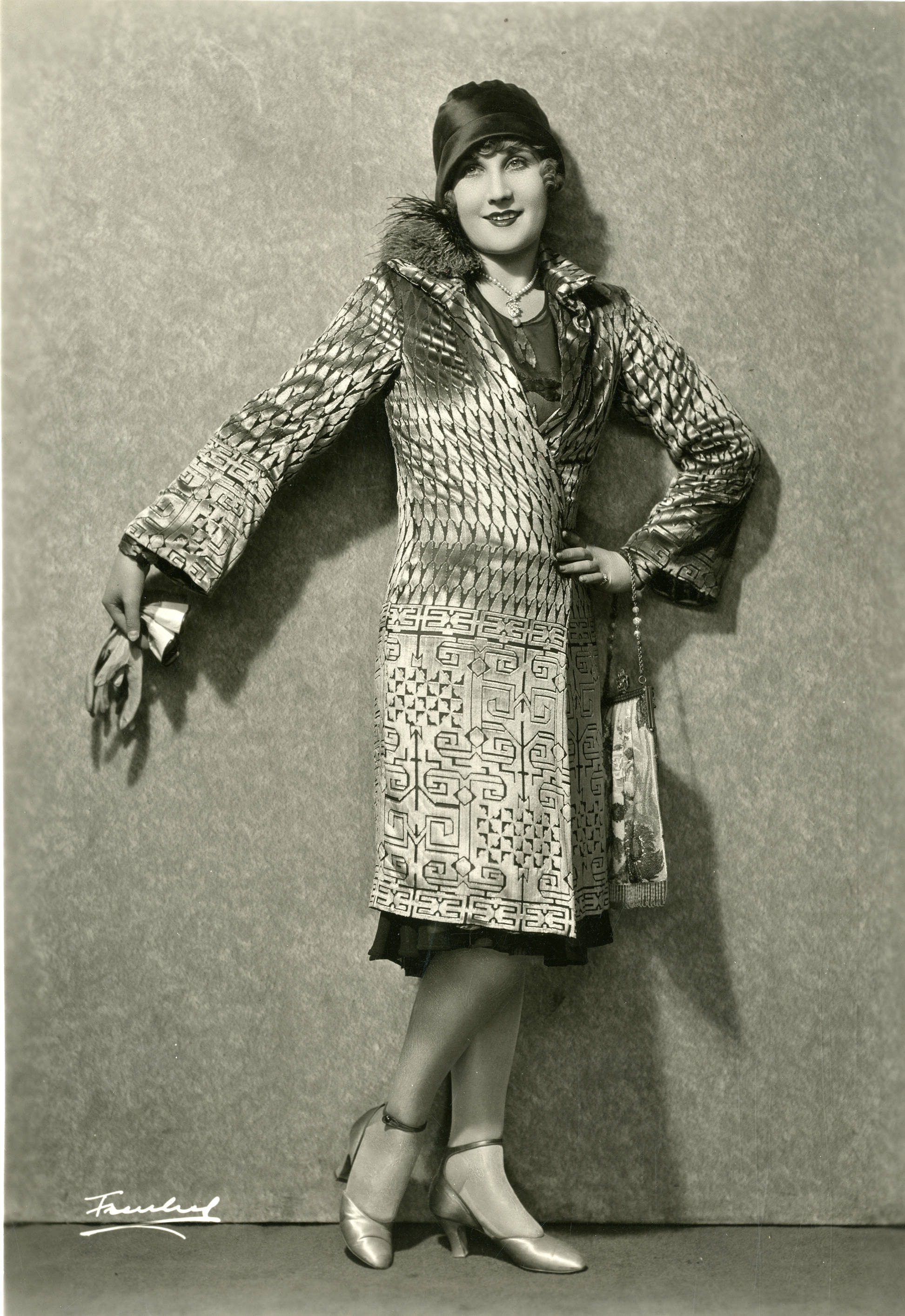
- Born: Margaret Winnifred Quimby; December 6, 1904; Minneapolis, Minnesota, United States
- Died: August 26, 1965 (aged 60); Minneapolis, Minnesota, United States
- Occupation: Actress
- Years active: 1924–1930 (film)

Margaret Quimby (1904–1965) was an American stage and film actress. She appeared in both lead and supporting roles during the silent and early sound era. There is a suggestion that she replaced fellow silent film actress Edna Marion in the movie Heads Up, Charley (1927), after Marion was not sufficiently the adventurous type. She failed to make an impact in the transition to talking films in the early 1930s, apparently because of problems with her speaking voice not being dynamic enough for sound, as she soon found her Hollywood film acting career suddenly coming to an end by 1930; she made her final film appearance in the 1931 film Men on Call, but the scenes with her appearance were deleted.

== Death ==
Margaret died on August 26, 1965 at the age of 60 in her hometown of Minneapolis, Minnesota.

== Filmography ==
- Fight and Win (1924)
- K.O. for Cupid (1924)
- One Glorious Scrap (1925)
- The Teaser (1925)
- Perils of the Wild (1925)
- What Happened to Jones (1926)
- The Radio Detective (1926)
- The Whole Town's Talking (1926)
- New York (1927)
- The Western Whirlwind (1927)
- Heads Up, Charley (1927)
- The World at Her Feet (1927)
- The Tired Business Man (1927)
- Us (1927)
- The Tragedy of Youth (1928)
- Sally of the Scandals (1928)
- Lucky Boy (1929)
- Two Men and a Maid (1929)
- The Rampant Age (1930)
- Trailing Trouble (1930)
- Ladies Love Brutes (1930)
- Men on Call (1931) (scenes deleted)

== Bibliography ==
- Lussier, Tim. "Bare Knees" Flapper: The Life and Films of Virginia Lee Corbin. McFarland, 2018. ISBN 978-1-4766-7568-8
- Pitts, Michael R. Poverty Row Studios, 1929–1940: An Illustrated History of 55 Independent Film Companies, with a Filmography for Each. McFarland & Company, 2005. ISBN 978-0-7864-2319-4
