= The Weaker Sex (1933 film) =

1933 film

- Directed by: Robert Siodmak
- Written by: Édouard Bourdet (play and screenplay); Henry Koster
- Produced by: André Haguet
- Starring: Mireille Balin; Victor Boucher; Pierre Brasseur
- Cinematography: Armand Thirard
- Music by: Henri Verdun
- Production companies: Les Films André Haguet; Nero Film
- Distributed by: César Films
- Release date: 17 October 1933
- Running time: 95 minutes
- Country: France
- Language: French

The Weaker Sex (French: Le Sexe faible) is a 1933 French comedy film directed by Robert Siodmak and starring Mireille Balin, Victor Boucher and Pierre Brasseur. It was based on a 1929 stage farce of the same name by Édouard Bourdet.

It was shot at the Epinay Studios in Paris. The film's sets were designed by the art directors Jacques-Laurent Atthalin and Hugues Laurent.

== Cast ==
- Victor Boucher as Antoine
- Jeanne Cheirel as Madame Leroy-Gómez
- Betty Stockfeld as Dorothy Freeman
- Marguerite Moreno as La comtesse Polacchi
- Pierre Brasseur as Jimmy
- Mireille Balin as Nicole
- Suzanne Dantès as Christina
- Fernand Fabre as Manuel
- Philippe Hériat as Philippe
- Maud Mayer as Clarisse
- José Noguéro as Carlos Pinto
- Nadine Picard as Lily
- Suzy Delair as une couturière
- Marcel Maupi as le faux policier

== Bibliography ==
- Oscherwitz, Dayna & Higgins, Maryellen. The A to Z of French Cinema. Scarecrow Press, 2009.
- Hervé Dumont (1 January 1981). Robert Siodmak: le maître du film noir. L'AGE D'HOMME. pp. 95–. ISBN 978-2-8251-3349-1.
