= The Tired Business Man =

1927 film

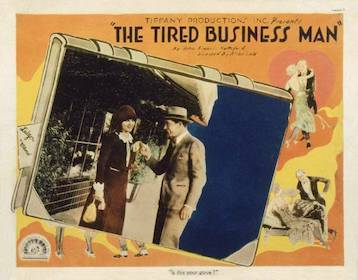
- Directed by: Allen Dale
- Written by: Jack Natteford
- Starring: Raymond Hitchcock; Dot Farley; Margaret Quimby
- Cinematography: Roy H. Klaffki; E. Fox Walker
- Edited by: John Rawlins
- Production company: Tiffany Pictures
- Distributed by: Tiffany Pictures
- Release date: June 30, 1927
- Running time: 60 minutes
- Country: United States
- Languages: Silent; English intertitles

The Tired Business Man is a 1927 American silent comedy film directed by Allen Dale and starring Raymond Hitchcock, Dot Farley and Margaret Quimby. It was produced and released by the independent studio Tiffany Pictures. The film's sets were designed by the art director George Sawley.

== Synopsis ==
The owners of a paving company are financially struggling and are set out to win a new contract from Alderman McGinnis with the assistance of their stenographer Rita.

== Cast ==
- Raymond Hitchcock as Alderman McGinnis
- Dot Farley as Mrs. McGinnis
- Mack Swain as Mike Murphy
- Margaret Quimby as Rita
- Charles Delaney as Larry Riley
- Lincoln Plumer as Pat Riley
- Blanche Mehaffey as Violet Clark
- Gibson Gowland as Ole Swanson
- Jim Farley as Sergeant

== Preservation ==
With no holdings located in archives, The Tired Business Man is considered a lost film. In February of 2021, the film was cited by the National Film Preservation Board on their Lost U.S. Silent Feature Films list.

== Bibliography ==
- Connelly, Robert B. The Silents: Silent Feature Films, 1910-36, Volume 40, Issue 2. December Press, 1998.
- Munden, Kenneth White. The American Film Institute Catalog of Motion Pictures Produced in the United States, Part 1. University of California Press, 1997.
