= Trailing Trouble =

1930 film

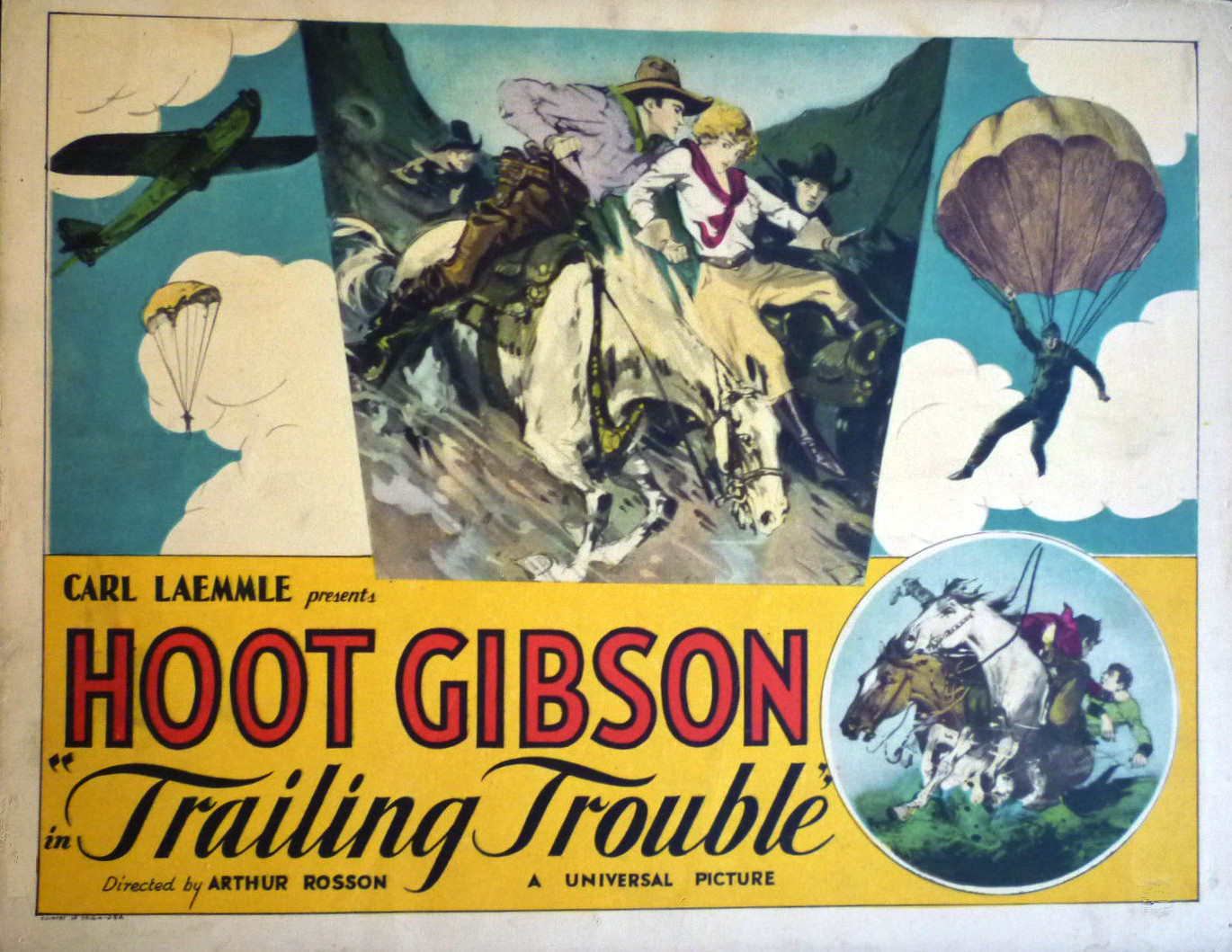
- Lobby card
- Directed by: Arthur Rosson
- Screenplay by: Harold Tarshis
- Produced by: Hoot Gibson
- Starring: Hoot Gibson; Margaret Quimby
- Cinematography: Harry Neumann
- Edited by: Gilmore Walker
- Production company: Universal Pictures
- Distributed by: Universal Pictures
- Release date: March 23, 1930
- Running time: 58 minutes
- Country: United States
- Language: English

Trailing Trouble is a 1930 American Western film directed by Arthur Rosson, written by Harold Tarshis, and starring Hoot Gibson. It was released on March 23, 1930, by Universal Pictures. The title was also seen as Trailin' Trouble.

== Plot ==
Ed King and Buck Moran are rivals for the affections of Molly, daughter of the rancher for whom King works. When King takes horses to a sale, Moran arranges to have the sale money stolen. Initially, the rancher accuses King of theft, but the thief eventually returns the money and identifies Moran as the man behind the plot. King captures Moran and regains Molly's affections.

== Cast ==
- Hoot Gibson as Ed King
- Margaret Quimby as Molly Blake
- William McCall as Pop Blake
- Pete Morrison as Buck Saunders
- Bob Perry as Red Gillis
- Olive Young as Ming Toy
- Milton Brown as Sheriff
- Mary Carr as Old Lady
- Wong Chung as Charlie - Desk Clerk
- Art Acord as Art Dobson (uncredited)

== Production ==
In addition to Rosson and Tarshis as director and writer, Carl Loemmle was the producer. Harry Neumann was the director of photography, Gilmore Walker was the film editor, and C. Roy Hunter was the recording engineer.

Former western star Art Acord made a brief and uncredited appearance as Art Dobson. He has several lines of dialogue. It is his last known film appearance, and the only opportunity to hear his voice.
