= The Weaker Sex (play) =

1929 play by Édouard Bourdet

The Weaker Sex (French: Le Sexe Faible) is a French comedy play by Édouard Bourdet. It was first staged in 1929. It mocks the various different schemes of fortune-hunting men to attract wealthy wives.

== Adaptation ==
In 1933 the play was turned into a film of the same title directed by Robert Siodmak. The 1948 British film The Weaker Sex is unconnected to the play.

== Bibliography ==
- Forman, Edward. Historical Dictionary of French Theater. Scarecrow Press, 2010.
