= The Train for Venice (play) =

1937 play

- Original language: French
- Written by: Georges Berr and Louis Verneuil
- Genre: Comedy

Premiere
- Date: 16 December 1937
- Place: Théâtre Saint-Georges, Paris

The Train for Venice (French: Le train pour Venise) is a 1937 comedy play by Georges Berr and Louis Verneuil. A farce, it premiered at the Théâtre Saint-Georges in Paris with a cast that included Verneuil, Huguette Duflos, André Alerme and Roland Armontel.

== Adaptations ==
The play has been adapted into films on two occasions: a 1938 French film The Train for Venice featuring a number of the original stage cast and a 1941 Hollywood remake My Life with Caroline starring Ronald Colman and Anna Lee, with the setting switched from Paris to America.

== Bibliography ==
- Goble, Alan. The Complete Index to Literary Sources in Film. Walter de Gruyter, 1999.
- Gauteur, Claude. À propos de Louis Verneuil (1893-1952). Séguier, 2007.
