= Paule Andral =

French actress (1879–1956)

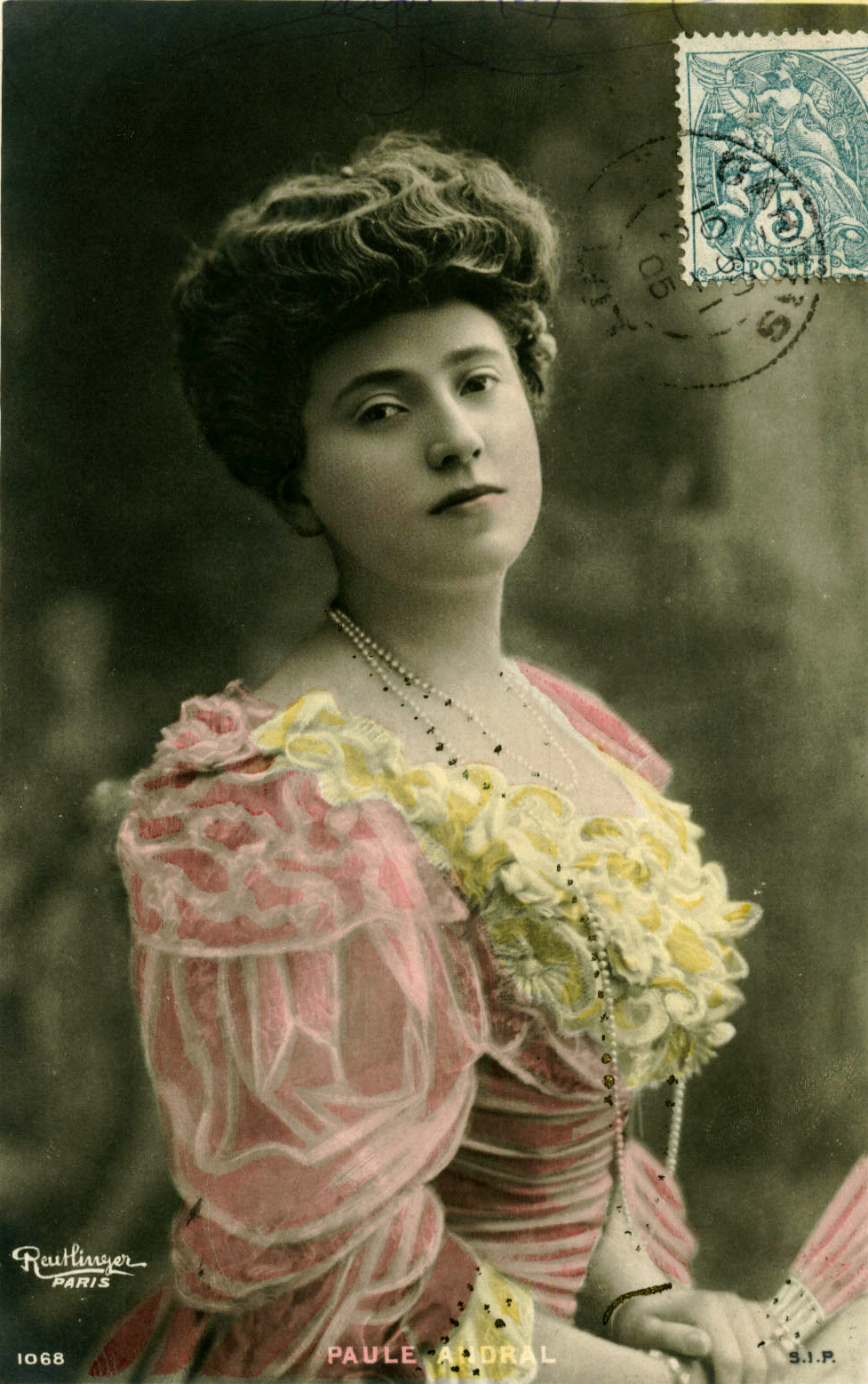
Postcard with Paule Andral. Picture Léopold-Émile Reutlinger.

Paule Andral (14 September 1879 – 28 March 1956) was a French actress.

Andral was born Paule Roucole in Paris and died in Nice in 1956.

== Selected filmography ==
- Tarakanova (1930)
- David Golder (1931)
- The Rebel (1931)
- The Beautiful Adventure (1932)
- Imperial Violets (1932)
- The Star of Valencia (1933)
- The Little King (1933)
- The Ironmaster (1933)
- Judex (1934)
- Street Without a Name (1934)
- Dora Nelson (1935)
- Speak to Me of Love (1935)
- Nights of Fire (1937)
- The Sinners (1949)

== Bibliography ==
- Alexander, John. Catherine the Great: Life and Legend. Oxford University Press, 1989
