= The Train for Venice (film) =

1938 film

- Directed by: André Berthomieu
- Written by: Louis Verneuil
- Based on: The Train for Venice by Louis Verneuil and Georges Berr
- Produced by: Eugène Tucherer
- Starring: Max Dearly; Huguette Duflos; Victor Boucher
- Cinematography: Fred Langenfeld
- Edited by: Christian Gaudin
- Music by: Georges Van Parys
- Production company: B.U.P. Française
- Distributed by: Les Films Paramount
- Release date: 14 September 1938
- Running time: 95 minutes
- Country: France
- Language: French

The Train for Venice (French: Le train pour Venise) is a 1938 French comedy film directed by André Berthomieu and starring Max Dearly, Huguette Duflos and Victor Boucher. It is based on the 1937 play of the same title written by Louis Verneuil and Georges Berr. Three years later an American adaptation of the play, My Life with Caroline, was produced starring Ronald Colman and Anna Lee.

The film's sets were designed by the art director Jean d'Eaubonne.

== Cast ==
- Max Dearly as Chardonne
- Victor Boucher as Etienne de Boisrobert
- Huguette Duflos as Caroline Ancelot
- Claire Olivier as Suzanne
- Louis Verneuil as Michel Ancelot
- Pierre Etchepare as d'Aubigny
- Madeleine Suffel as Berthe
- Roger Vieuille as Amédée
- Georges Douking as Le barman
- Robert Ralphy as Un quémandeur
- Léon Larive as Un quémandeur

== Bibliography ==
- Goble, Alan. The Complete Index to Literary Sources in Film. Walter de Gruyter, 1999.
