= Olive Young (actress) =

American actress (1903–1940)

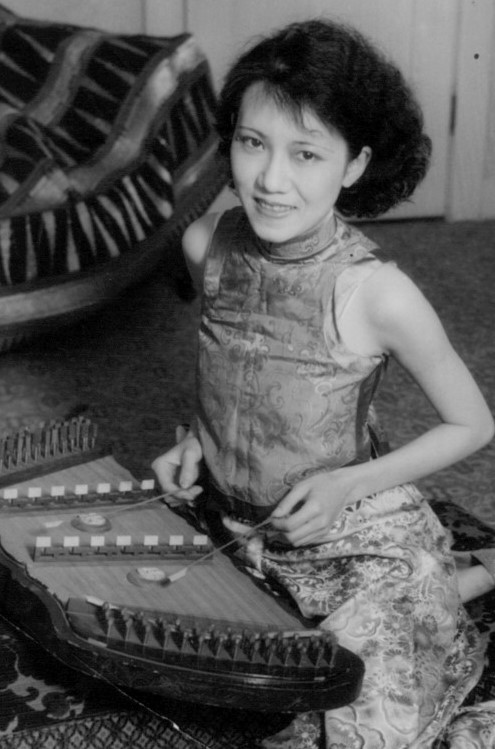
- Actress and singer Olive Young plays a hammered dulcimer, which the Associated Press called a "butterfly harp".
- Born: June 21, 1903; St. Joseph, Missouri, U.S.
- Died: October 5, 1940 (aged 37); Bayonne, New Jersey, U.S.
- Other names: Olive Young Lum (married name); Pei Fen Young (stage name)
- Occupations: Actress, Blues singer
- Years active: 1925–1932
- Spouse: Alfred C.S. Lum (married about 1933)

Signature
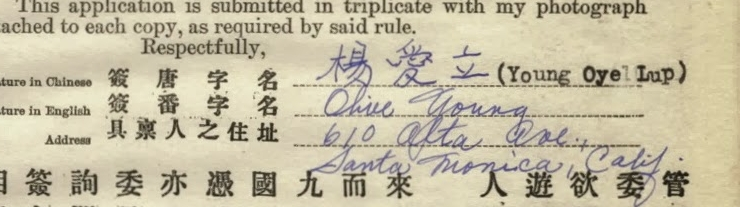

Olive Young (Chinese: 楊愛立; pinyin: Yáng Àilì; (Note: Romanized variously as Oye Lup Young, Aili Yang, Ai-Lee Yang, and Ayli Yang on the movie screen.) June 21, 1903 – October 5, 1940) was an American-born film actress in China.

Of Chinese ancestry, she visited China, where she may have been the first female motion picture photographer and movie director in China. Later in life she became an American actress and a touring Blues singer. A cover-girl for Liangyou pictorial magazine, she was labeled a flapper, a career woman, part of the movement of modern independent women worldwide which also included China's "new-age woman" (新時代女性) or "modern miss" (摩登小姐), and the Japanese "modern girl".

In 1926 she broke the taboo against kissing in Chinese movies, causing Chinese moviegoers to "gasp".

== Childhood ==
Olive Young was born in St. Joseph, Missouri, to a Chinese-American family. Her father Dr. M. F. Young (Mon Fung Young) was born in California and worked as a doctor, running ads in the newspapers advertising his use of Chinese herbal medicines as cures for female diseases, chronic diseases, sexual weakness, kidney and stomach problems, nervous headaches, and rheumatism. Her mother, Chun She Young, a native of China was a housewife. Mrs. Young was listed as Georgia Young, in the 1910 U.S. Census in Kansas City (Ward 6), born in Missouri; however Olive listed her mother as born in China on the 1930 U.S. Census. When Olive was a girl, her parents took her to live in China for "a number of years", staying in Hong Kong. Afterward she attended school for a year in San Francisco and two more in Excelsior Springs, Missouri, before entering Christian College in Excelsior Springs.

She came to public attention in October 1920 when she was "sixteen" and tried to elope. The newspaper said she was 16, but if she was born in July 1903, she would have been 17. She had to be carried back to her father, who tried to have the White-Slave Traffic Act used against the man she wanted to marry, who was 20. She was sent afterward to a boarding school in Salt Lake City.

== Acting ==
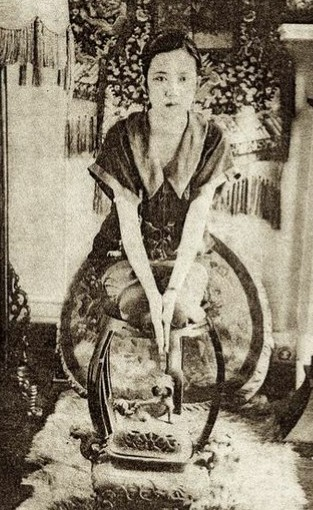
Olive Young on the cover of the Chinese magazine Liángyǒu (The Young Companion), May 15, 1926.

Although she had a college education and pressure from her father to study medicine, she rejected that. She told a reporter from the Oregonian, "The subject didn't interest me. I wanted adventure."

She traveled to China in 1922 and while there she got into acting, getting her first opportunity with the China Sun Motion Picture Company. She was to perform in Rouge with them, but ended up with the British American Tobacco Company, where she acted in her first three films.

She stayed for several years, beginning a career in silent-picture movies. Finding success, she decided to pursue acting in Hollywood. She returned to the United States in 1929. Where she had starred in movies in China, a young attractive urban woman, in Hollywood she was only able to get typed roles. She was signed to play the leading role of a movie, Fools Luck with Hoot Gibson, announced November 17, 1929, but there is no information that the movie was made or released. (Apparently released under the title "Trailing Trouble". Same dates and costars as Fools Luck). In her final two films she didn't have named roles. She played the maid in The Man Who Came Back and a singer who sang "a Cantonese ditty in Fu Manchu's underground speakeasy" in The Mask of Fu Manchu.

Following her film career, she moved on to music, traveling and performing a mix of blues and Chinese music.

== Movies ==
It was thought that none of Young's Chinese movies are known to have survived. However, there is now a partial clip of one of her movies, Daxia Gan Fengchi (大侠甘风池 Dà xiá gānfēngchí) that has been recovered and is online. In this clip there is only a glimpse of Olive Young, near the end, playing a young woman. The only other film footage of her is in her American movies, Trailin' Trouble, The Man Who Came Back, and The Mask of Fu Manchu.

=== British American Tobacco Company, Shanghai ===
- 1925 One Dollar (一块钱 Yīkuài qián A Dollar)
- 1925 The Magical Monk (神僧 Shén sēng God)
- 1926 Filial Piety or Closing a Rift (情天終補 Qíng tiān zhōng bǔ Love)

=== Fei Fei Film Company, Shanghai ===
- 1926 The Singed Moth or Langdie (狂蜂浪蝶 Kuáng fēng làng dié The Mad Butterfly). Olive played one of the two female roles with Tang Xueqing, counterpart to the lead actor Xue Juexian.

=== Great Wall Film Company, Shanghai ===
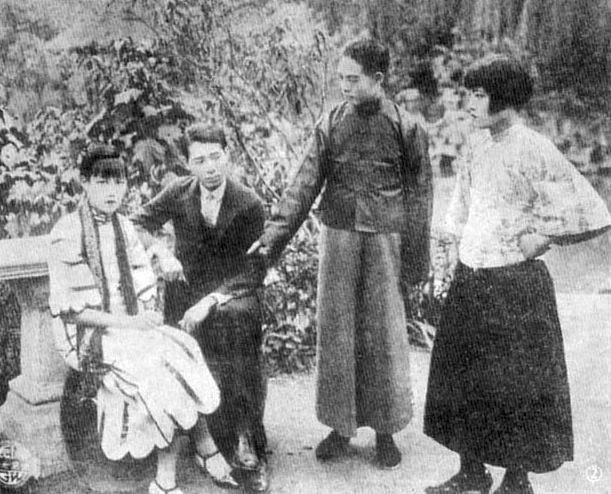
Image from A Flapper's Downfall. From left Olive Young, Jiqun Liu, Xiadian Lei, and Hanjun Liu (刘汉钧).

- 1926 The Ways of Youth or Kule Yuanyang (苦樂鴛鴦 Kǔ lè yuānyāng Bitter Music), (starring role)
- 1927 A Flapper's Downfall (浪女穷途 Làng nǚ qióngtú A Woman's Poor Way)

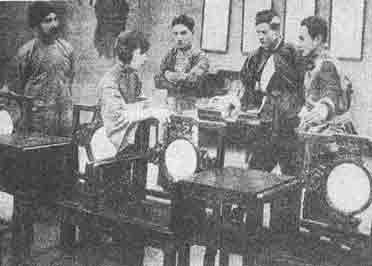
Single Arrow Revenge or Yigian Chou. Olive Young is second from left.

- 1927 Single Arrow Revenge or Yigian Chou (一箭仇 Yī jiàn chóu A Revenge)

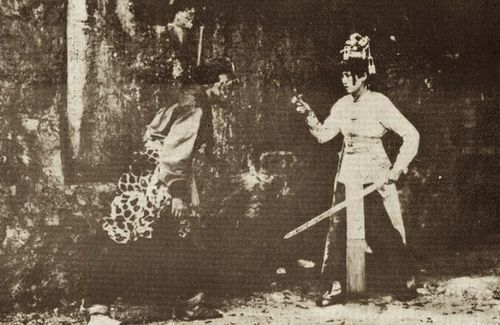
Olive Young as Princess Iron Fan in the 1927 silent film The Mystic Fan (火焰山).

- 1927 Nar Jah(哪吒出世 Nǎ zhā chūshì Nezha is born)

Movie takes from Chinese mythology. Nezha (played by Zhang Zede) is the child of Li Jing (played by Lei Xiadian) and his wife (played by Liu Hanzhen). In the legend, he runs afoul of Shiji Niangniang, a sort of stone spirit, played in the movie by Olive Young.

- 1927 The Mystic Fan or Huoyanshan (火焰山 huǒyàn shān Flame Mountain)

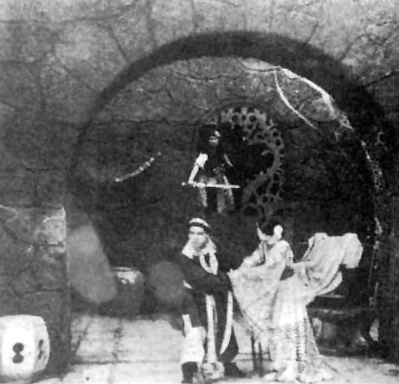
Frame from the silent film Hero Gan Fenchi (大侠甘风池 Dà xiá gānfēngchí). Olive Young is front-right.

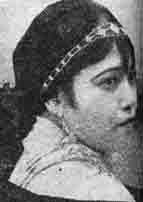
Olive Young in Hero Gan Fenchi 大侠甘风池, 1928

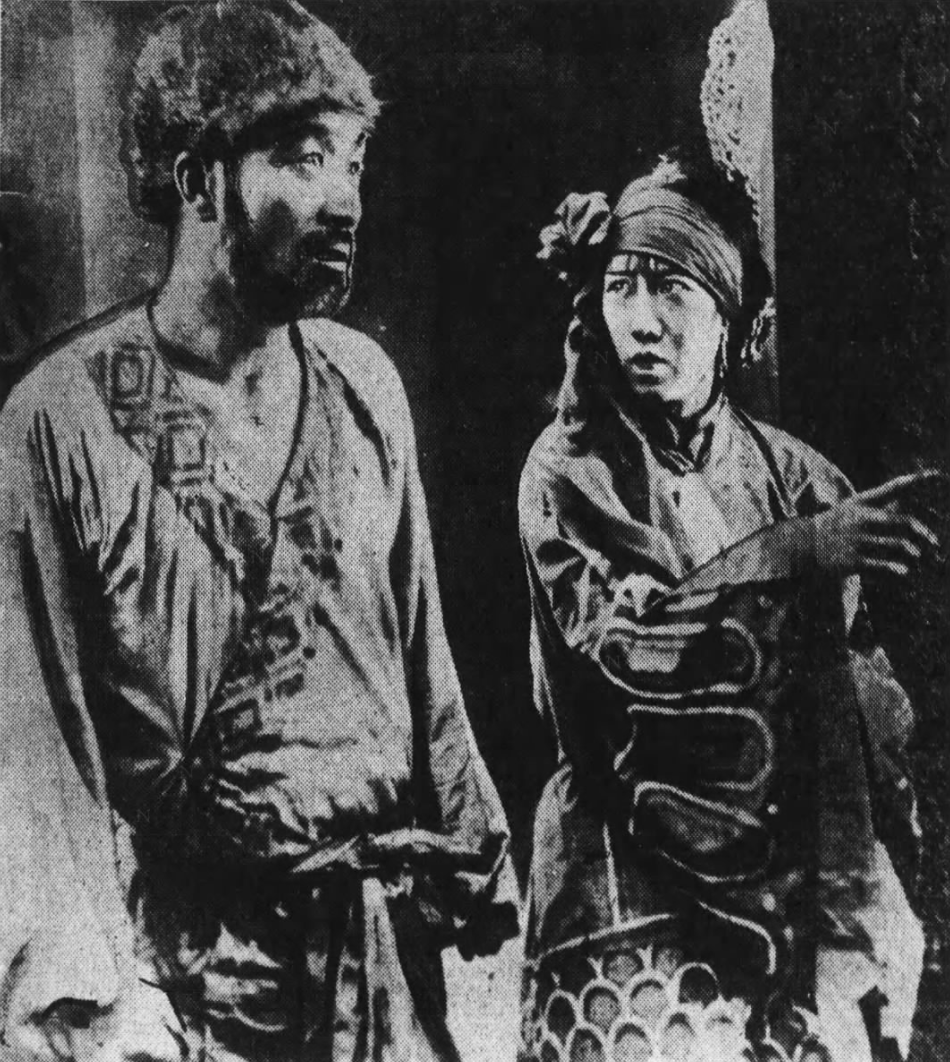
Frame from Hero Gan Fenchi or Kan the Great Knight. Olive Young is on right. This movie was also called in America "Soiled Souls."

- 1928 Kan the Great Knight Errant or Daxia Gan Fengchi (大侠甘风池 Dà xiá gānfēngchí)

Kan Feng-chi is the movie's hero, whose self-imposed function was to fight the unkind rich and to help the oppressed poor. Not enough of the movie has survived to make Olive's role clear.

- 1928 The Two Reformers or Yaoguang Xiaying (妖光俠影 Yāoguāng xiá yǐng The Devil's Shadow)

=== China Sun Film Company, Shanghai ===
- 1928 The Hot Blooded Man or Rexue Nan'er (熱血男兒 Rèxuè nán'ér Bloody Man)

=== New Century Film Company, Shanghai ===
- 1928 Romance in a Poor Village (窮鄉艷遇 Qióng xiāng yànyù Poor town encounter)

=== Nansing Film Company, Indonesia ===
- 1929 Resia Boroboedoer

=== Hollywood, California ===
- 1930 Trailing Trouble, Hoot Gibson Productions/Universal Pictures, Hollywood
- 1930 Ridin' Law, Biltmore Productions/Big 4 Film Corp.
- 1931 The Man Who Came Back, Fox Film Corp. (not a named role, plays a maid)
- 1932 The Mask of Fu Manchu, Metro-Goldwyn Mayer (non-credited role as a singer)
