= The Lover of Madame Vidal =

1936 film

- Directed by: André Berthomieu
- Written by: Louis Verneuil
- Produced by: Roger Richebé
- Starring: Elvire Popesco; Victor Boucher; Jacques Louvigny
- Cinematography: Jean Isnard
- Production company: Films Roger Richebé
- Distributed by: Films du Jeudi
- Release date: 1 October 1936
- Running time: 87 minutes
- Country: France
- Language: French

The Lover of Madame Vidal (French: L'amant de Madame Vidal) is a 1936 French comedy film directed by André Berthomieu and starring Elvire Popesco, Victor Boucher and Jacques Louvigny. It was based on a 1928 play of the same name by Louis Verneuil. The film's sets were designed by the art director Jean d'Eaubonne.

== Synopsis ==
When she wrongly believes that her husband is having an affair, Madame Vidal hires a man to pose as her own lover.

== Cast ==
- Elvire Popesco as Catherine Vidal
- Victor Boucher as Philippe Marcelin
- Jacques Louvigny as Monsieur Vidal
- Hugues de Bagratide
- Paul Demange
- Pierre Etchepare as de Brézolles
- Louis Florencie as Monsieur Giroux
- Simone Mareuil as Suzanne
- Mireille Perrey as Françoise Charny
- Robert Seller
- Jean Témerson as Guillaume - le domestique

== Bibliography ==
- Goble, Alan. The Complete Index to Literary Sources in Film. Walter de Gruyter, 1999.
