= Louis Verneuil =

French playwright, screenwriter and actor (1893–1952)

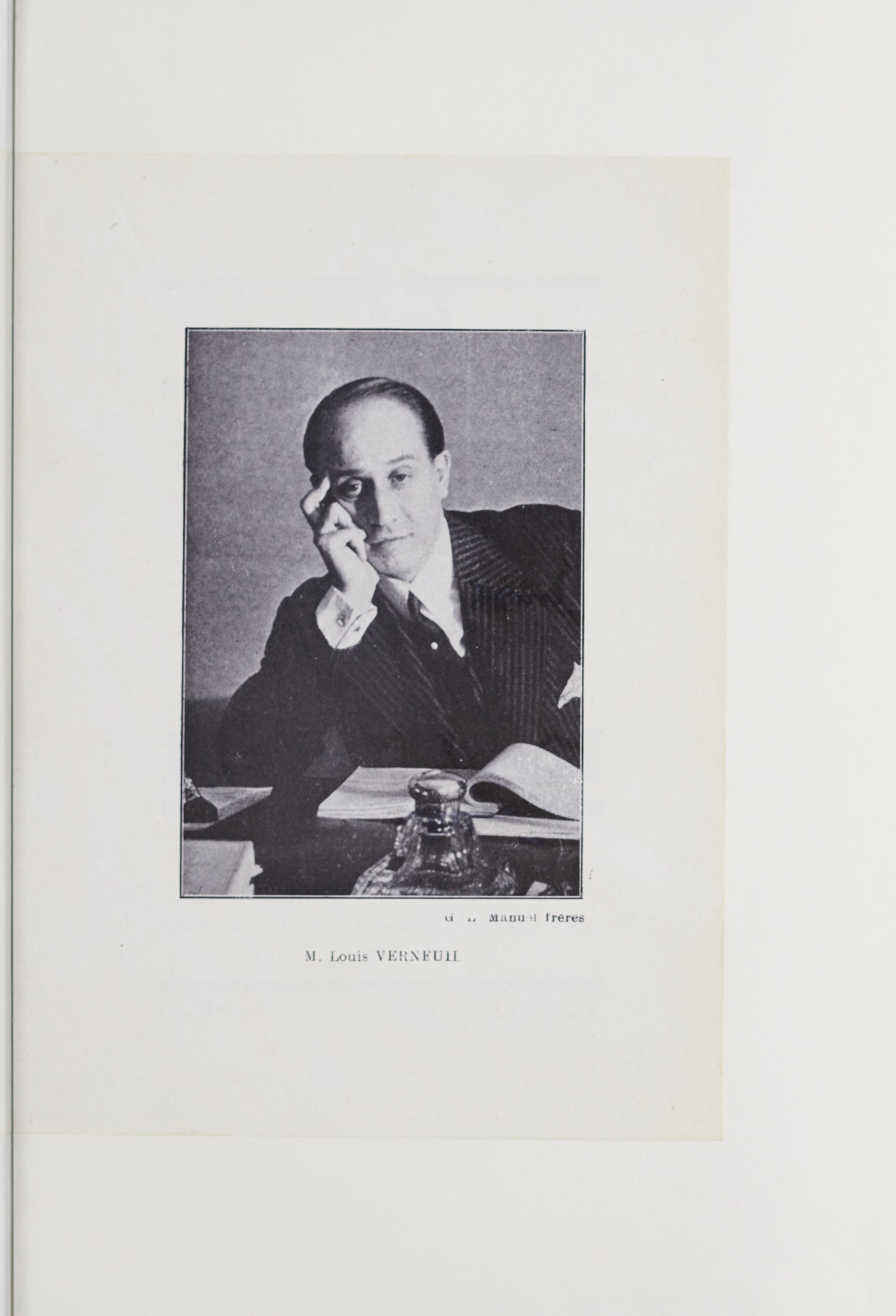
Louis Verneuil

Louis Jacques Marie Collin du Bocage (14 May 1893 – 3 November 1952), better known by the pen name Louis Verneuil, was a French playwright, screenwriter, and actor.

== Biography ==
Born in Paris, Verneuil wrote approximately sixty plays and was best known for comedy. Many of his works were produced on Broadway including Monsieur Lamberthier, adapted into Jealousy (1928) starring John Halliday and Fay Bainter, and subsequently adapted again in 1946 as Obsession with Eugenie Leontovich and Basil Rathbone; and Affairs of State (1950) which starred Celeste Holm and Harry Bannister. Affairs of State ran for 610 performances at the Music Box Theatre and was the first work Verneuil wrote in English.

His screenwriting credits include Avec Le Sourire (With a Smile) (1936) which starred Maurice Chevalier, and Cosas de mujer (Feminine Wiles) (1951). The Bette Davis film Deception (1946) was a third adaptation of his Monsieur Lamberthier.

Verneuil was once married to Lysiane Bernhardt, the granddaughter of Sarah Bernhardt. In 1942 he wrote a biography of his grandmother-in-law, titled The Marvellous Life of Sarah Bernhardt.

Verneuil died by suicide at the age of 59 by slashing his throat. Police found his body in a bathtub. Verneuil is buried in the Père Lachaise Cemetery.

== Selected filmography ==
- Who Is the Man? (Silent film, 1924, based on Daniel)
- Le Fauteuil 47 (Silent film, 1926, based on Le Fauteuil 47)
- The World at Her Feet (Silent film, 1927, based on Maître Bolbec and son mari)
- Get Your Man (Silent film, 1927, based on Tu m'épouseras)
- My Sister and I (Silent film, 1929, based on Ma sœur et moi)
- Jealousy (1929, based on Monsieur Lamberthier)
- The Road to Paradise (French, 1930, French adaptation of a German screenplay)
- Burglars (German, 1930, based on Guignol, le cambrioleur)
  - Caught in the Act (French, 1931, based on Guignol, le cambrioleur)
- The Love Habit (1931, based on Pour avoir Adrienne)
- My Cousin from Warsaw (French, 1931, based on Ma cousine de Varsovie)
  - My Cousin from Warsaw (German, 1931, based on Ma cousine de Varsovie)
- The Woman They Talk About (German, 1931, based on Daniel)
- Companion Wanted (French, 1932, French adaptation of a German screenplay)
- La petite de Montparnasse (French, 1932, based on Pile ou face)
  - Das Mädel vom Montparnasse (German, 1932, based on Pile ou face)
- The Cheeky Devil (German, 1932, based on Pour avoir Adrienne)
  - You Will Be My Wife (French, 1932, based on Pour avoir Adrienne)
- Azaïs (French, 1932, based on Azaïs)
- His Best Client (French, 1932, Original story)
- Just My Luck (1933, based on Azaïs)
- All for Love (French, 1933, French adaptation of a German screenplay)
- Ihre Durchlaucht, die Verkäuferin (German, 1933, based on Ma sœur et moi)
  - Caprice de princesse (French, 1934, based on Ma sœur et moi)
- Nemo's Bank (French, 1934, based on La banque Nemo)
- The Lady Is Willing (1934, based on Une femme ravie)
- Get Your Man (1934, based on Tu m'épouseras)
- A Woman Who Knows What She Wants (Czech, 1934, based on Le Fauteuil 47)
  - A Woman Who Knows What She Wants (German, 1934, based on Le Fauteuil 47)
- Arlette and Her Fathers (French, 1934, based on Avril)
- Une femme chipée (French, 1934, based on Une femme ravie)
- L'École des contribuables (French, 1934, based on L'École des contribuables)
- Maître Bolbec et son mari (French, 1934, based on Maître Bolbec et son mari)
- Speak to Me of Love (French, 1935, based on Parlez-moi d'amour)
- Dora Nelson (French, 1935, based on Dora Nelson)
- The Lover of Madame Vidal (French, 1936, based on L'amant de Madame Vidal)
- The King (French, 1936, adaptation of a play by Gaston Arman de Caillavet, Robert de Flers and Emmanuel Arène)
- With a Smile (French, 1936, original screenplay)
- The Green Jacket (French, 1937, adaptation of a play by Gaston Arman de Caillavet and Robert de Flers)
- Mademoiselle ma mère (French, 1937, based on Mademoiselle ma mère)
- Le Fauteuil 47 (French, 1937, based on Le Fauteuil 47)
- True Confession (1937, based on Mon Crime)
- The Train for Venice (French, 1938, based on The Train for Venice)
- Dora Nelson (Italian, 1939, based on Dora Nelson)
- Medio millón por una mujer (Spanish, 1940, based on Une femme ravie)
- My Life with Caroline (1941, based on The Train for Venice)
- Mischievous Susana (Spanish, 1945, based on Ma sœur et moi)
- Deception (1946, based on Monsieur Lamberthier)
- Cross My Heart (1946, based on Mon Crime)
- Novio, marido y amante (Spanish, 1948, based on Mademoiselle ma mère)
- La otra y yo (Spanish, 1949, based on Dora Nelson)
- Canas al aire (Spanish, 1949, based on L'amant de Madame Vidal)
- My Sister and I (Swedish, 1950, based on Ma sœur et moi)
- Cosas de mujer (Spanish, 1951, based on Maître Bolbec and son mari)
- Le Passage de Vénus (French, 1951, based on Le Passage de Vénus)
- My Sister and I (German, 1954, based on Ma sœur et moi; released posthumously)
- A Woman Who Knows What She Wants (German, 1958, based on Le Fauteuil 47; released posthumously)
