= Ashida =

Ashida (written: 芦田) is a Japanese surname. People with the name include:

- Ashida Nobumori, (died 1575), holder of Mitake Castle
- Hitoshi Ashida (芦田 均, 1887–1959), Japanese politician who served as the 47th Prime Minister of Japan
- Jun Ashida (芦田 淳, 1930–2018), Japanese fashion designer
- Mana Ashida (芦田 愛菜, born 2004), Japanese child actress, tarento and singer
- Masanori Ashida (芦田 昌憲, born 1945), Japanese photographer
- Shinsuke Ashida (芦田 伸介, 1914–1999), Japanese actor
- Tae Ashida (芦田 多恵, born 1964), Japanese fashion designer
- Toyoo Ashida (芦田 豊雄, 1944–2011), Japanese anime character designer, animation director and director

== Fictional characters ==
- Noriko Ashida (codename Surge), a character from X-Men

== See also ==
- Ashida-shuku, a historical rest area along the Nakasendō
- Ashida River, a river near Fukuyama, Hiroshima, Japan
