= Antoinette Sabrier =

1927 film

- Ève Francis and Paul Guidé
- Directed by: Germaine Dulac
- Written by: Romain Coolus; Germaine Dulac
- Starring: Ève Francis; Gabriel Gabrio; Jean Toulout
- Cinematography: Raoul Aubourdier; Maurice Forster; Paul Parguel
- Production company: Pathé Consortium Cinéma
- Distributed by: Pathé Consortium Cinéma
- Release date: 20 January 1928
- Running time: 80 minutes
- Country: France
- Languages: Silent; French intertitles

Antoinette Sabrier is a 1928 French silent drama film directed by Germaine Dulac and starring Ève Francis, Gabriel Gabrio and Jean Toulout. The film's sets were designed by the art director Louis Nalpas.

== Cast ==
- Ève Francis as Antoinette Sabrier
- Gabriel Gabrio as Germain Sabrier
- Jean Toulout as Jamagne
- Yvette Armel as Hélène Doreuil
- Paul Guidé as Roger Dangenne
- Paul Menant as Chartrain
- Paul Cervières as Gaston Doreuil
- Ashida as Le danseur
- Lou Davy

== Bibliography ==
- Dayna Oscherwitz & MaryEllen Higgins. The A to Z of French Cinema. Scarecrow Press, 2009.
