= The Lovers of Marianne =

1953 film by Jean Stelli

- Directed by: Jean Stelli
- Written by: Charles Exbrayat
- Produced by: Aimé Frapin; Hervé Missir
- Starring: Gaby Morlay; André Luguet; Jean Debucourt
- Cinematography: Nicolas Hayer
- Edited by: Germaine Fouquet
- Music by: Georges Tzipine
- Production company: Consortium du Film
- Distributed by: Consortium du Film
- Release date: 20 December 1953
- Running time: 94 minutes
- Country: France
- Language: French

The Lovers of Marianne (French: Les amoureux de Marianne) is a 1953 French comedy film directed by Jean Stelli and starring Gaby Morlay, André Luguet and Jean Debucourt. It was shot at the Boulogne Studios in Paris. The film's sets were designed by the art director Raymond Gabutti.

== Synopsis ==
When a seat in the French Parliament becomes vacant the industrialist Duboutois targets it as does his former accountant Berton, following a dispute between the two men. Complicating matters further is the love affair between their respective children, Gaston and Catherine.

== Cast ==
- Gaby Morlay as Mme. Duboutois
- André Luguet as M. Duboutois
- Jean Debucourt as Monseigneur
- Georges Chamarat as Commandant Duparc
- Raoul Marco as Jobert
- François Joux
- Sophie Leclair as Catherine Berton
- Pierre Gallon as Gaston Duboutois
- Henri Rollan as Le marquis
- Catherine Fonteney as La belle-mère de Berton
- Fred Pasquali as Le commissaire
- Marcel Raine
- Jean-Louis Le Goff
- Robert Murzeau
- Clairjane
- Monique Gérard as Marguerite
- Paul Azaïs
- Roger Bontemps
- Jean Brochard as Jean Berton
- Albert Michel
- Dominique Marcas
- Lucien Callamand as Le secrétaire de préfecture
- Gabriel Gobin
- Michèle Nadal]
- Léon Pauléon

== Bibliography ==
- Rège, Philippe. Encyclopedia of French Film Directors, Volume 1. Scarecrow Press, 2009.
