= The Lady from Vittel =

1937 film

- Directed by: Roger Goupillières
- Written by: Roger Ferdinand
- Based on: The Lady from Vittel by Georges Dolley
- Produced by: André Aron
- Starring: Alice Field; Frédéric Duvallès; Fernand Charpin
- Cinematography: Jean Isnard
- Music by: Ralph Erwin
- Production companies: Les Films Roger Ferdinand; Pan-Ciné
- Distributed by: Paris Cinéma Location
- Release date: 5 February 1937
- Running time: 84 minutes
- Country: France
- Language: French

The Lady from Vittel (French: La dame de Vittel) is a 1937 French comedy film directed by Roger Goupillières and starring Alice Field, Frédéric Duvallès and Fernand Charpin. It was based on a 1934 play of the same title by Georges Dolley. The film's sets were designed by the art director Lucien Aguettand.

== Synopsis ==
In Paris Jean Bourselet encounters the attractive and flirtatious Madeleine Fidoux, whose husband owns a hotel in the spa town of Vittel. In order to further their acquittance he feigns ill health so he can visit the resort, which is famous for its local mineral water. However his suspicious wife follows him there and, discovering that he is passing himself off as a widower, begins flirtations of her own with men. Eventually the couple are lovingly reconciled.

== Cast ==
- Alice Field as Henriette Bourselet
- Frédéric Duvallès as Jean Bourselet
- Fernand Charpin as Victor Fidoux
- Christiane Delyne as Madeleine Fidoux
- André Bervil as José Gonin
- Denise Grey as Mme Bleu
- Paul Faivre as Cornillon

== Bibliography ==
- Bessy, Maurice & Chirat, Raymond. Histoire du cinéma français: 1935-1939. Pygmalion, 1986.
- Crisp, Colin. Genre, Myth and Convention in the French Cinema, 1929-1939. Indiana University Press, 2002.
- Rège, Philippe. Encyclopedia of French Film Directors, Volume 1. Scarecrow Press, 2009.
