= Romain Coolus =

French writer

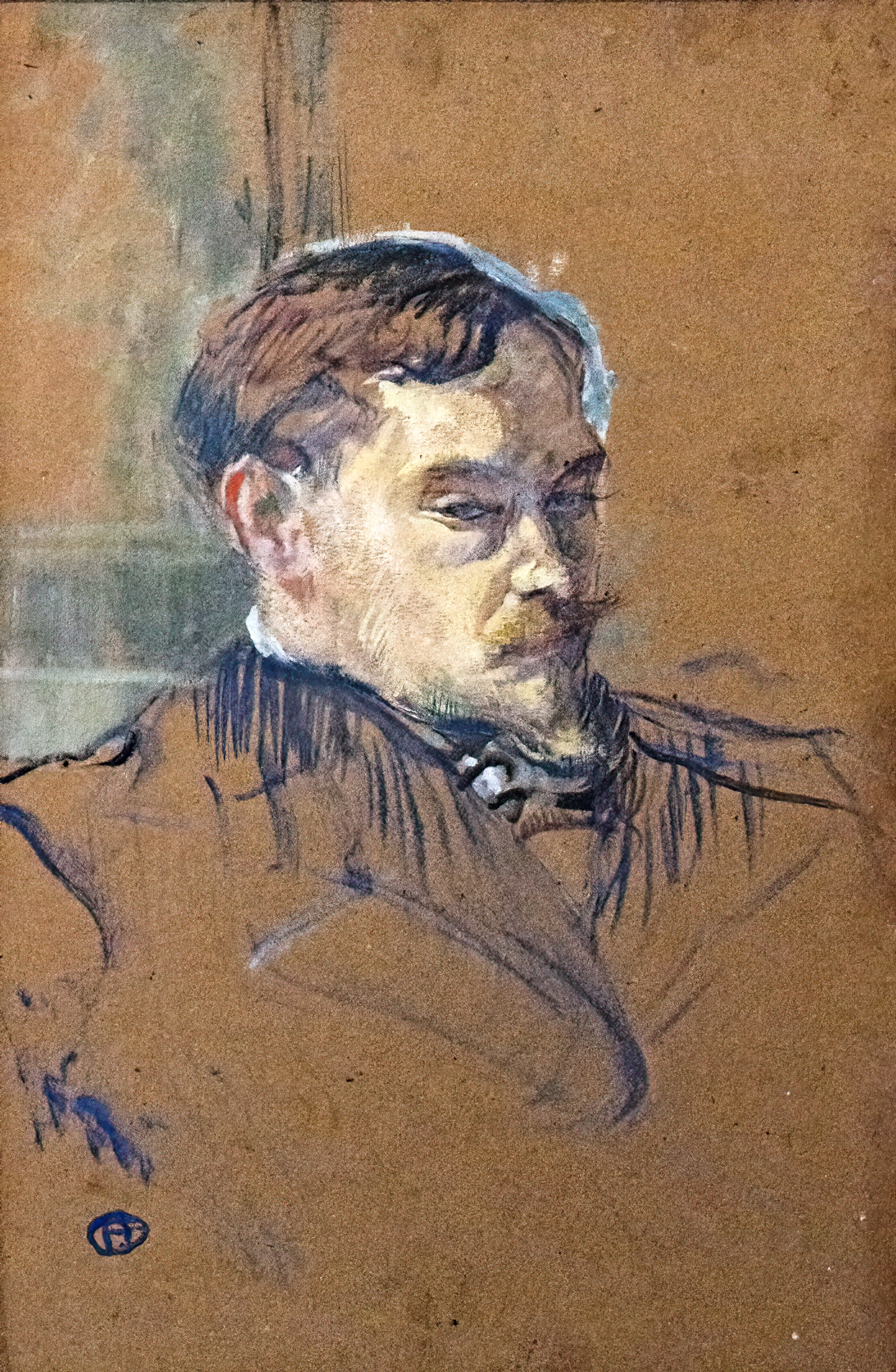
- Romain Coolus by Toulouse-Lautrec (1899)
- Born: René Max Weill; 25 May 1868; Rennes
- Died: 9 September 1952 (aged 84); Paris
- Occupations: Author, screenwriter, dramatist

Signature
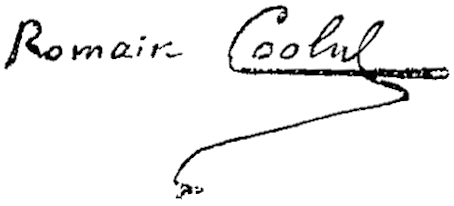

René Max Weill (25 May 1868 – 9 September 1952), who used the pseudonym Romain Coolus, was a French novelist, dramatist and film scriptwriter.

== Biography ==
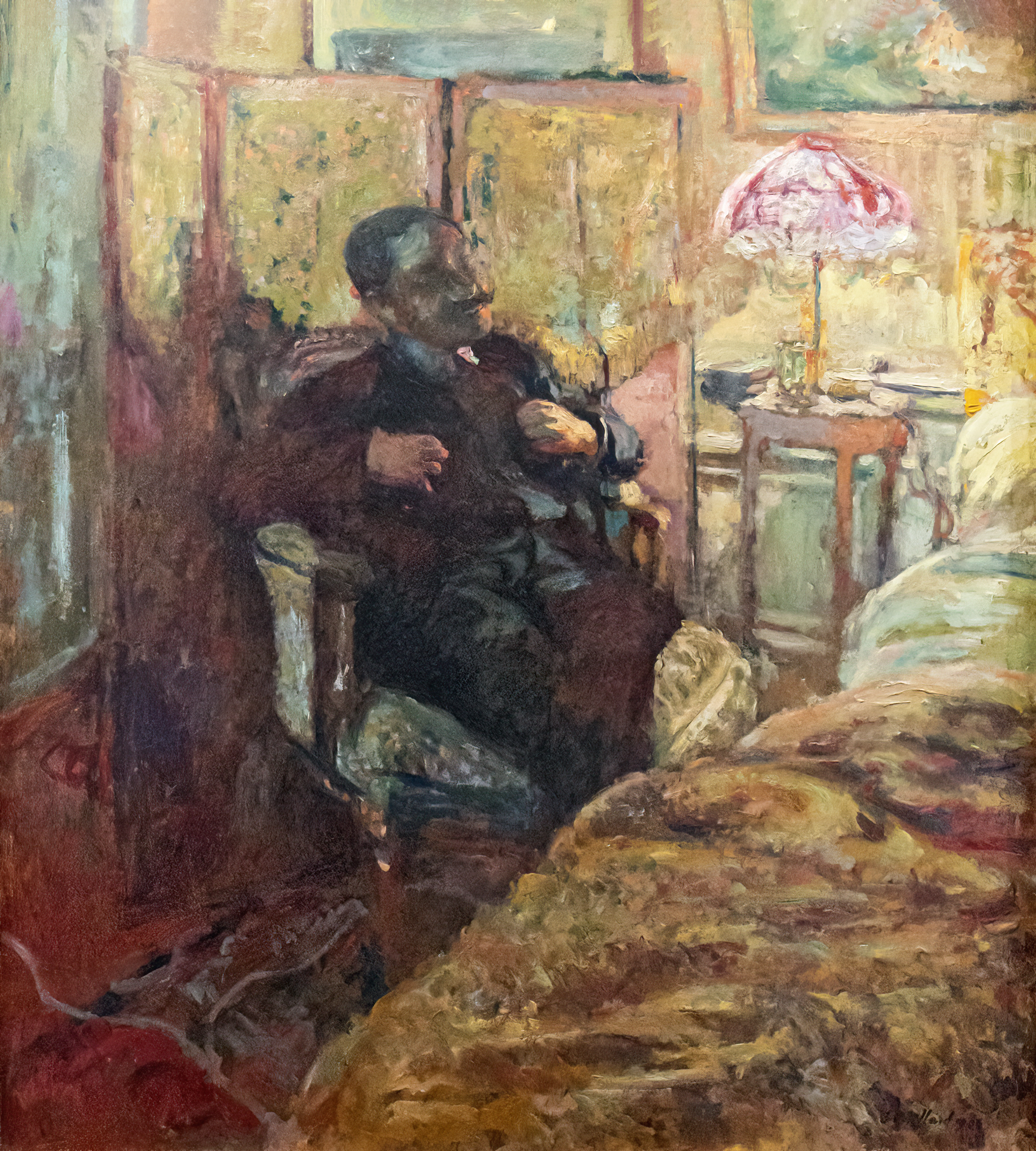
Portrait by Édouard Vuillard (1906)

== Works ==
=== Theater ===
- 1893 : Le Ménage Brésile (first play), one-act comedy, at Théâtre Libre d'Antoine
- 1896 : Raphaël, three-act comedy, premiered at Théâtre de l'Œuvre by Lugné-Poë
- 1897 : L'Enfant malade, four-act play, au Théâtre des Escholiers.
- 1898 : Lysiane, five-act play, premiered at Théâtre de la Renaissance
- 1899 : Cœur blette, two-act comedy, Théâtre Antoine
- 1900 : Le Marquis de Carabas, three-act comédie-bouffe in verses
- 1901 : Les Amants de Sazy, premiered at the Théâtre du Gymnase
- 1901 : Rue Spontini
- 1902 : Lucette, three-act comedy, premiered at the Théâtre du Gymnase
- 1903 : Yvonne dîne en ville
- 1903 : Antoinette Sabrier, 3-act play, in prose, Théâtre du Vaudeville, premiered at the Comédie-Française with a mise-en-scène by René Alexandre
- 1903 : Kangaroo, one-act comedy
- 1903 : Les Pieds qui remuent
- 1905 : Petite Peste, three-act- play, premiered at Théâtre du Vaudeville, then at the Théâtre de la Renaissance, film version in 1938
- 1906 : L'Enfant chérie
- 1907 : Cœur à cœur, 3-act- comedy, Théâtre Antoine
- 1908 : Les Rendez-vous strasbourgeois, one-act opéra-bouffe, music by Charles Cuvillier, Comédie-royale
- 1909 : Effets d'optique, 2-act comedy
- 1909 : Mirette a ses raisons, one-act comedy, Comédie-royale
- 1909 : Quatre fois sept, vingt-huit, three-act- comedy, Théâtre des Bouffes-Parisiens
- 1909 : Le Risque
- 1910 : Une femme passa, 3-act- comedy, premiered at Théâtre de la Renaissance
- 1910 : Les Bleus de l'amour, 3-act comedy, premiered at Théâtre de l'Athénée, film version in 1918
- 1910 : Les Jeux de l'amour et de la conférence, one-act comedy
- 1911 : La Revue des X, with Gaston Arman de Caillavet, Francis de Croisset, Albert Guinon, Max Maurey, Jacques Richepin, Théâtre des Bouffes-Parisiens
- 1912 : L'Autruche
- 1912 : La Côte d'amour, three-act comedy
- 1913 : Les Roses rouges, three-act play, premiered at Théâtre de la Renaissance
- 1914 : L'Amour buissonnier, two-act comedy, premiered at Théâtre de la Renaissance
- 1920 : L'Éternel masculin, three-act comedy, premiered at Théâtre Michel
- 1921 : Le Paradis fermé, three-act comedy, with Maurice Hennequin, premiered at Théâtre de l'Athénée
- 1922 : La Sonnette d'alarme, three-act comedy, with Maurice Hennequin, premiered at Théâtre de l'Athénée
- 1922 : Diane au bain, four-act play, with Maurice Hennequin, at Théâtre des Nouveautés
- 1924 : Né un dimanche, three-act comedy
- 1925 : Les Baisers de Panurge, three-act comedy, with André Rivoire, premiered at the Comédie-Caumartin
- 1925 : La Fifille à sa mémère, one-act comedy, premiered au Grand Guignol
- 1926 : Les Vacances de Pâques, comedy
- 1927 : La reine de Biarritz, three-act play, with Maurice Hennequin, at Théâtre Antoine, adapted to the cinema in 1934
- 1927 : Pas une secousse, operetta in three acts, with Blanche Alix, distics by Victor Alix and Henri Jacques, music by Victor Alix, premiered at Monte-Carlo
- 1928 : La Guêpe, three-act comedy, premiered at Théâtre Femina
- 1930 : Pardon, Madame, three-act comedy, with André Rivoire, premiered at Théâtre Michel
- 1931 : Mad
- 1932 : Boby-Chéri, three-act operette, with Jacques Ardot (lyrics), music by Victor Alix, premiered at Théâtre de la Scala
- 1934 : Fragonard, musical comedy with three acts and four scenes, with André Rivoire (libretto), music by Gabriel Pierné, premiered in Paris at Théâtre de la Porte-Saint-Martin
- 1934 : Mandrin, four-act operetta, with André Rivoire (libretto), music by Joseph Szulc, premiered in Paris at Théâtre Mogador

=== Film scripts ===
- 1909 : Le Roman d'une bottine et d'un escarpin, directed by Georges Monca,
- 1909 : Le Chien de Montargis, directed by Georges Monca
- 1917 : Les Bleus de l'amour, adapted and directed by Henri Desfontaines, after Coolus's play premiere in 1910
- 1927 : Antoinette Sabrier, directed by Germaine Dulac, after Coolus's play premiere in 1905.
- 1932 : Les Bleus de l'amour, second adaptation, directed by Jean de Marguenat, after Coolus's play premiere in 1910
- 1934 : The Queen of Biarritz, directed by Jean Toulout, after Coolus's and Hennequin's play premiered in 1927.
- 1935 : La Sonnette d'alarme, directed by Christian-Jaque, after Coolus's and Hennequin's play premiered in 1922.
- 1938 : Petite Peste, directed by Jean de Limur, after Coolus's play premiered in 1905.

== Bibliography ==
- Romain Coolus (1921). Théâtre complet (in French). Paris: Albin Michel. OCLC 4355753., 10 Vols
- Film Database
- « Haussements d'épaules » (textes poétiques), volume 1 de la revue La Revue Blanche, oct 1891
