= Darling Anatole =

- Directed by: Claude Heymann
- Written by: Albert Dubout; Jean Halain
- Produced by: Paul Robin
- Starring: Alice Field; Paul Demange; Jim Gérald
- Cinematography: Raymond Agnel
- Edited by: Marthe Poncin
- Music by: Vincent Scotto
- Production company: Union Européenne Cinématographique
- Distributed by: L'Union des Producteurs de Films
- Release date: 28 April 1954
- Running time: 62 minutes
- Country: France
- Language: French

Darling Anatole (French: Anatole chéri) is a 1954 French comedy film directed by Claude Heymann and starring Alice Field, Paul Demange and Jim Gérald. It is based on a comic strip by Albert Dubout. Demange had previously played the role of Anatole in Street Without a King (1950).

== Cast ==
- Alice Field as Caroline
- Paul Demange as Anatole
- Jim Gérald as Mme Anatole
- Fernand Gilbert as Sparadra
- Christine Carère
- René Hell as Le docteur
- Jacqueline Noëlle as Lolotte
- Mériel
- Pierre Gallon
- Lina Roxa
- Denise Kerny
- Georges Sauval
- Anne-Marie Mersen

== Bibliography ==
- Parish, Robert. Film Actors Guide. Scarecrow Press, 1977.
