= Maurice Hennequin =

French-Belgian playwright (1863–1926)

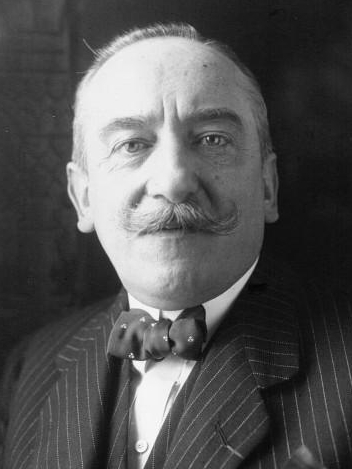
- Maurice Hennequin in 1914
- Born: 10 December 1863; Liège, Belgium
- Died: 3 September 1923 (aged 59); Montreux, Switzerland
- Occupation: Playwright
- Years active: 1885–1927

Maurice Hennequin (10 December 1863 – 3 September 1926) was a French-naturalized Belgian playwright.

== Biography ==
A great-grandson of the painter Philippe-Auguste Hennequin, Maurice Hennequin was the son of Alfred Hennequin (1842–1887), himself a playwright, who created a kind of vaudeville, with a complex plot but rigorously structured, nicknamed "hennequinade" The young Maurice began in the world of theater at the age of 19 in 1882, sometimes helped by his father during his early years.

In a 45-year long career, he gave nearly a hundred plays, mostly comedies and vaudevilles, written either alone or in collaboration. Many of these works experienced vivid success, such as Le Système Ribadier, written in collaboration with Georges Feydeau, or Vous n'avez rien à déclarer ?, quoted by one character in the play A Flea in Her Ear by Feydeau, and twice adapted for film. Some of his plays even experienced real triumph, like Le Monsieur de cinq heures with 568 performances, which was considerable in his time.

He married mademoiselle Braem.

== Works ==
=== Theatre ===
==== From 1885 to 1899 ====
- 1885: L'oiseau bleu, one-act comedy, premiered at the Théâtre de la Renaissance in Paris on 10 October
- 1885: Le sous-préfet de Nanterre, comedie in one act
- 1885: La Guerre joyeuse, opéra comique in three acts, adapted by Alfred and Maurice Hennequin, music by Johann Strauss
- 1886: Trop de vertu !, play in three acts by Alfred and Maurice Hennequin, first presented in Paris at the Théâtre du Palais-Royal, on 27 January
- 1886: Monsieur Irma, comedy in one act, premiered in Paris at the Théâtre de la Renaissance on 16 April.
- 1887: Les Vacances du mariage, comedy in three acts, with Albin Valabrègue, premiered at the Théâtre des Menus-Plaisirs in Paris on 12 February.
- 1887: Les Oiseaux de passage, comedy in one act, premiered at the Théâtre du Parc in Brussels on 30 April.
- 1887: Le Marquis de Kersalec, comedy in one act
- 1888: Un mariage au téléphone, comedy in one act, first performed in Brussels at the Théâtre du Vaudeville on 31 January.
- 1889: Une Nuit orageuse
- 1889: Madame reçoit, comédie enfantine
- 1889: Pour un hanneton, comédie enfantine
- 1890: Un prix Montyon, comédie-vaudeville in three acts, with Albin Valabrègue, presented for the first time in Paris at the Théâtre du Palais-Royal in December.
- 1891: La Petite Poucette, vaudeville-opérette in three acts and five tableaux, with Maurice Ordonneau, music by Raoul Pugno, premiered at the Théâtre de la Renaissance in Paris on 5 March
- 1891: Le Château de M. Toulardot
- 1891: Fatal zéro
- 1891: Le Fluide de John
- 1891: Le Réveil du calife
- 1892: La Femme du commissaire, comédie-vaudeville in three acts with Maurice Ordonneau, premiered at the Théâtre de Cluny in Paris on 7 August.
- 1892: Le Système Ribadier, comedy in three acts, with Georges Feydeau, premiered at the Théâtre du Palais-Royal in Paris on 30 November, 78 performances, despite a fairly good review.
- 1892: Le Dragon.
- 1892: Une Enquête, comédy in one act
- Inviolable !, comédie en vaudevilles in three acts, premiered at the Théâtre des Nouveautés in Paris on 11 April and in Brussels at the Théâtre du Vaudeville (Brussels) on 8 October 1897.
- 1894: Les Joies du foyer, comedy in three acts, first presented in Paris at the Théâtre du Palais-Royal on 1 September.
- 1894: Les Ricochets de l'amour, comedy in three acts, premiered at the Théâtre du Palais-Royal in Paris on 27 December.
- 1894: Son Secrétaire
- 1894: Le 3è Hussards, opéra comique in three acts, with Antony Mars
- 1896: Le Paradis, play in three acts, with Paul Bilhaud and A. Barré, premiered in Paris at the Théâtre du Palais-Royal on 3 April.
- Sa Majesté l'Amour, operetta in three acts, with Antony Mars, first presented at the Eldorado on 24 December
- 1897: Les Fêtards, operetta in three acts, music by Victor Roger, libretto by Antony Mars and Maurice Hennequin, created for the first time in Paris at the Théâtre du Palais-Royal on 28 October.
- 1898: Le Terre-Neuve, comedy in three acts, with Alexandre Bisson, premiered in Paris at the Théâtre du Palais-Royal on 26 February
- 1898: Place aux femmes !, comedy in four acts, with Albin Valabrègue, premiered in Paris at the Théâtre du Palais-Royal on 8 October.
- 1898: Le Voyage autour du Code, play in four acts, with Paul Bilhaud and Georges Duval
- 1898: Le Remplaçant, comedy in three acts, with Georges Duval and William Busnach
- 1899: La Poule blanche, operetta in four acts, with Antony Mars, music by Victor Roger, first performed at the Théâtre de Cluny on 13 January
- 1899: Coralie et Cie, play in three acts, with Albin Valabrègue, presented for the first time in Paris at the Théâtre du Palais-Royal on 30 November.

==== From 1900 to 1927 ====
- 1901: M'amour, comedy in three acts with Paul Bilhaud, premiered in Paris at the Théâtre du Palais-Royal on 22 January.
- 1901: Nelly Rozier, comedy en three acts, with Paul Bilhaud, premiered in Paris at the Théâtre des Nouveautés on 10 December.
- 1901: Le Coup de fouet, comédie en vaudevilles in three acts, with Paul Bilhaud and Georges Duval
- 1903: La Famille Boléro, play in three acts, with Paul Bilhaud, premiered in Paris at the Théâtre des Nouveautés on 13 February.
- 1903: Heureuse !, comedy in three acts, with Paul Bilhaud, first presented in Paris at the Théâtre du Vaudeville on 26 February.
- 1904: Les Dragées d'Hercule, play in three acts, with Paul Bilhaud, first performed in Paris at the Théâtre du Palais-Royal on 15 January.
- 1904: La Gueule du loup, comedy in three acte, with Paul Bilhaud, first presented in Paris at the Théâtre des Nouveautés on 28 October.
- 1905: Le Gant, comedy in one act, with Paul Bilhaud, premiered in Paris at the Théâtre du Palais-Royal on 22 April.
- 1905: Florette & Patapon, play in three acts, with Pierre Veber, first presented in Paris at the Théâtre des Nouveautés on 20 October.
- 1906: Totote et Boby, comedy in one act, first performed in Paris at the Théâtre du Palais-Royal on 3 October.
- 1906: Vous n'avez rien à déclarer ?, play in three acts, with Pierre Veber, first presented in Paris at the Théâtre des Nouveautés on 6 October.
- 1907: Vingt jours à l'ombre, play in three acts, with Pierre Veber, presented for the first time in Paris at the Théâtre des Nouveautés on 20 November.
- 1907: Patachon, four-act comedy, with Félix Duquesnel, premiered in Paris at the Théâtre du Vaudeville on 23 October.
- 1908: Crime passionnel !, one-act play, first performed in Monaco at the Théâtre des Beaux-Arts on 3 February.
- 1910: Noblesse oblige !, play in three acts, with Pierre Veber, first presented in Paris at the Théâtre des Nouveautés on 6 janvier.
- 1910: Une aventure impériale, comedy in one act, with Serge Basset, first performed in Paris at the Théâtre des Capucines on 10 February.
- 1910: Tais-toi, mon cœur !, play in three acts, with Pierre Veber, premiered in Paris at the Théâtre du Palais-Royal on 6 April.
- 1910: Yette, comedy in one act, first presented in Paris at the Théâtre des Capucines on 13 October.
- 1911: Une heure après, je le jure, comedy in one act, with Georges Mitchell, présented for the first time in Paris at the Théâtre des Capucines on 12 October.
- 1911: Aimé des femmes, comedy in three acts, with Georges Mitchell
- 1912: Une nuit d'amour, one-act play, with Serge Basset, first presented in Paris at the Théâtre du Grand Guignol on 24 March.
- 1912: Flirt pour deux !, comédie en un acte, représentée pour la première fois à Paris sur le Théâtre des Capucines on 3 October.
- 1912: La Présidente, play in three acts, with Pierre Veber, first presented in Paris at the Théâtre du Palais-Royal on 27 Novembre. Adapted by Anne Caldwell and Otto Harbach into the Broadway musical Oh, Please!
- 1913: Les Honneurs de la guerre, comedy in three acts
- 1913: Mon bébé, play in three acts after Baby mine by Margaret Mayo
- 1914: La Fille de Figaro, with Hughes Delorme, at the Théâtre de l'Apollo
- 1916: Madame et son filleul, comedy in three acts, with Pierre Veber
- 1916: La Petite Dactylo, with Georges Mitchell
- 1917: Le Compartiment des dames seules, play in three acts, with Georges Mitchell, first performed in Paris at the Théâtre du Palais-Royal on 27 November.
- 1920: Et moi, j'te dis qu'elle t'a fait d'l'œil, play in three acts, with Pierre Veber
- 1921: Le Paradis fermé, comedy in three acts, with Romain Coolus, premiered in Paris at the Théâtre de l'Athénée on 2 November.
- 1922: La Seconde Nuit de noces, with Bilhaud and Veber
- 1922: La Sonnette d'alarme, comedy in three acts, with Romain Coolus, first presented in Paris at the Théâtre de l'Athénée on 1 December
- 1922: Diane au bain, play in three acts, with Romain Coolus, at the Théâtre des Nouveautés
- 1924: Le Monsieur de cinq heures, play in three acts, with Pierre Veber, at the Théâtre du Palais-Royal
- 1926: Passionnément, musical comedy in three acts by Maurice Hennequin and Albert Willemetz, music by André Messager, Théâtre de la Michodière, on 16 January
- 1927: La reine de Biarritz, play in three acts, with Romain Coolus, at the Théâtre Antoine
- 1927: On ne roule pas Antoinette, play in three acts with Pierre Véber, at the théâtre du Palais-Royal
- undated: Les Poches des autres, comedy in one act

=== Filmography ===
- Floretta and Patapon, directed by Mario Caserini (Italy, 1913, based on the play Florette & Patapon)
- Madame Coralie & C. (Italy, 1914, based on the play Coralie et Cie)
- Madame la Presidente, directed by Frank Lloyd (1916, based on the play La Présidente)
- Amor mio!, directed by Eleuterio Rodolfi (Italy, 1916, based on the play M'amour)
- Gli onori della guerra, directed by Baldassarre Negroni (Italy, 1917, based on the play Les Honneurs de la guerre)
- Venti giorni all'ombra, directed by Gennaro Righelli (Italy, 1918, based on the play Vingt jours à l'ombre)
- Noblesse oblige, directed by Marcello Dudovich (Italy, 1918, based on the play Noblesse oblige)
- Madame et son filleul, directed by Georges Monca and Charles Prince (France, 1919, based on the play Madame et son filleul)
- Le gioie del focolare, directed by Baldassarre Negroni (Italy, 1920, based on the play Les Joies du foyer)
- La gola del lupo, directed by Torello Rolli (Italy, 1923, based on the play La Gueule du loup)
- Largo alle donne!, directed by Guido Brignone (Italy, 1924, based on the play Place aux femmes!)
- The Gay Deceiver, directed by John M. Stahl (1926, based on the play Patachon)
- A Kiss in a Taxi, directed by Clarence G. Badger (1927, based on the play Le Monsieur de cinq heures)
- Floretta and Patapon, directed by Amleto Palermi (Italy, 1927, based on the play Florette & Patapon)
- Su última noche, directed by Chester Franklin and Carlos F. Borcosque (1931, based on the play Patachon)
- Passionately, directed by René Guissart and Louis Mercanton (France, 1932, based on the operetta Passionnément)
- Coralie and Company, directed by Alberto Cavalcanti (France, 1934, based on the play Coralie et Cie)
- The Queen of Biarritz, directed by Jean Toulout (France, 1934, based on the play La reine de Biarritz)
- Compartiment de dames seules, directed by Christian-Jaque (France, 1935, based on the play Le Compartiment des dames seules)
- La Sonnette d'alarme, directed by Christian-Jaque (France, 1935, based on the play La Sonnette d'alarme)
- Et moi, j'te dis qu'elle t'a fait de l'œil, directed by Jack Forrester (France, 1935, based on the play Et moi, j'te dis qu'elle t'a fait d'l'œil)
- You Can't Fool Antoinette, directed by Paul Madeux (France, 1936, based on the play On ne roule pas Antoinette)
- Vous n'avez rien à déclarer?, directed by Léo Joannon (France, 1937, based on the play Vous n'avez rien à déclarer?)
- La Belle de Montparnasse, directed by Maurice Cammage (France, 1937, based on the play Le Paradis)
- Le Monsieur de cinq heures, directed by Pierre Caron (France, 1938, based on the play Le Monsieur de cinq heures)
- The President, directed by Fernand Rivers (France, 1938, based on the play La Présidente)
- Mi suegra es una fiera, directed by Luis Bayón Herrera (Argentina, 1939, based on the play Le Compartiment des dames seules)
- Et moi, j'te dis qu'elle t'a fait de l'œil, directed by Maurice Gleize (France, 1950, based on the play Et moi, j'te dis qu'elle t'a fait d'l'œil)
- La mujer del león, directed by Mario C. Lugones (Argentina, 1951, based on the play Le Monsieur de cinq heures)
- Mademoiselle Gobete, directed by Pietro Germi (Italy, 1952, based on the play La Présidente)
- Suegra último modelo, directed by Enrique Carreras (Argentina, 1953, based on the play Le Compartiment des dames seules)
- El Calavera, directed by Carlos F. Borcosque (Argentina, 1954, based on the play Les Joies du foyer)
- Vous n'avez rien à déclarer?, directed by Clément Duhour (France, 1959, based on the play Vous n'avez rien à déclarer?)
- Le pillole di Ercole, directed by Luciano Salce (Italy, 1960, based on the play Les Dragées d'Hercule)
- La Presidentessa, directed by Luciano Salce (Italy, 1977, based on the play La Présidente)

== Bibliography ==
- Henri Gidel (1986). Le Vaudeville. Que sais-je ? (in French). Paris: Presses Universitaires de France. p. 126. ISBN 2130394582.
