= Broken Wings (1933 film) =

1933 film

- Directed by: André Berthomieu
- Written by: André Berthomieu; Pierre Wolff
- Based on: Broken Wings by Pierre Wolff
- Produced by: André E. Algazy
- Starring: Victor Francen; Alice Field; Abel Tarride
- Cinematography: Jean Isnard; Jean-Marie Maillols; Jacques Montéran
- Edited by: Marcel Cravenne
- Music by: Henri Verdun
- Production company: Algo Films
- Distributed by: Franfilmdis
- Release date: 16 June 1933
- Running time: 74 minutes
- Country: France
- Language: French

Broken Wings (French: Les ailes brisées) is a 1933 French drama film directed by André Berthomieu and starring Victor Francen, Alice Field and Abel Tarride. It is based on a play of the same title by Pierre Wolff, who also co-wrote the screenplay. The film's sets were designed by the art director Robert-Jules Garnier.

== Cast ==
- Victor Francen as Fabrège
- Léon Roger-Maxime as Georges
- Alice Field as Jacqueline
- Abel Tarride as Pascal
- Nicole Martel as Betty
- Cousin as Le duc de Charente
- Inka Krymer as Denise Lamblin
- Georges Deneubourg as Baptiste
- Blanche Denège as Madame Blanche Grasset

== Bibliography ==
- Crisp, Colin. Genre, Myth and Convention in the French Cinema, 1929-1939. Indiana University Press, 2002.
- Goble, Alan. The Complete Index to Literary Sources in Film. Walter de Gruyter, 1999.
- Rège, Philippe. Encyclopedia of French Film Directors, Volume 1. Scarecrow Press, 2009.
- Smoodin, Eric. Paris in the Dark: Going to the Movies in the City of Light, 1930–1950. Duke University Press, 2020.
