= The Old Devil =

1933 film

- Directed by: Anatole Litvak
- Written by: Anatole Litvak; Serge Veber
- Based on: The Old Devil by Fernand Nozière
- Produced by: Simon Schiffrin
- Starring: Harry Baur; Pierre Blanchar; Alice Field
- Cinematography: Curt Courant
- Edited by: Henri Rust
- Music by: Georges Van Parys
- Production company: Cipar Films
- Distributed by: Pathé Consortium Cinéma
- Release date: 3 November 1933
- Running time: 99 minutes
- Country: France
- Language: French

The Old Devil (French: Cette vieille canaille) is a 1933 French drama film directed by Anatole Litvak and starring Harry Baur, Pierre Blanchar and Alice Field. It was based on a 1931 play of the same title by Fernand Nozière. It was shot at the Joinville Studios of Pathé-Natan in Paris. The film's sets were designed by the art director André Andrejew.

== Synopsis ==
The surgeon Guillaume Vautier falls in love with the much younger fairground worker Hélène after he treats her. He tolerates her flirtations with other, younger men, in order to keep her close to him. However, when an old boyfriend Jean Trapeau turns up in her life things become more complicated.

== Cast ==
- Harry Baur as Guillaume Vautier
- Pierre Blanchar as Jean Trapeau
- Alice Field as Hélène
- Paul Azaïs as Jacques
- Christiane Dor as Suzanne
- Madeleine Geoffroy as Germaine
- Pierre Stéphen as Le professeur d'histoire
- Madeleine Guitty as La mère d'Hélène
- Ginette Leclerc as une fille détenue au commissariat

== Bibliography ==
- Bessy, Maurice & Chirat, Raymond. Histoire du cinéma français: 1929-1934. Pygmalion, 1988.
- Crisp, Colin. French Cinema—A Critical Filmography: Volume 1, 1929–1939. Indiana University Press, 2015.
- Goble, Alan. The Complete Index to Literary Sources in Film. Walter de Gruyter, 1999.
- Willoughby, Bob. The Star Makers: On Set with Hollywood's Greatest Directors. Merrell, 2003.
