= Paul Bilhaud =

French playwright and librettist (1854–1933)

- Born: 31 December 1854; Bruère-Allichamps (Cher)
- Died: 8 January 1933 (aged 78); Avon (Seine-et-Marne)
- Occupations: Playwright, librettist
- Movement: Incoherents

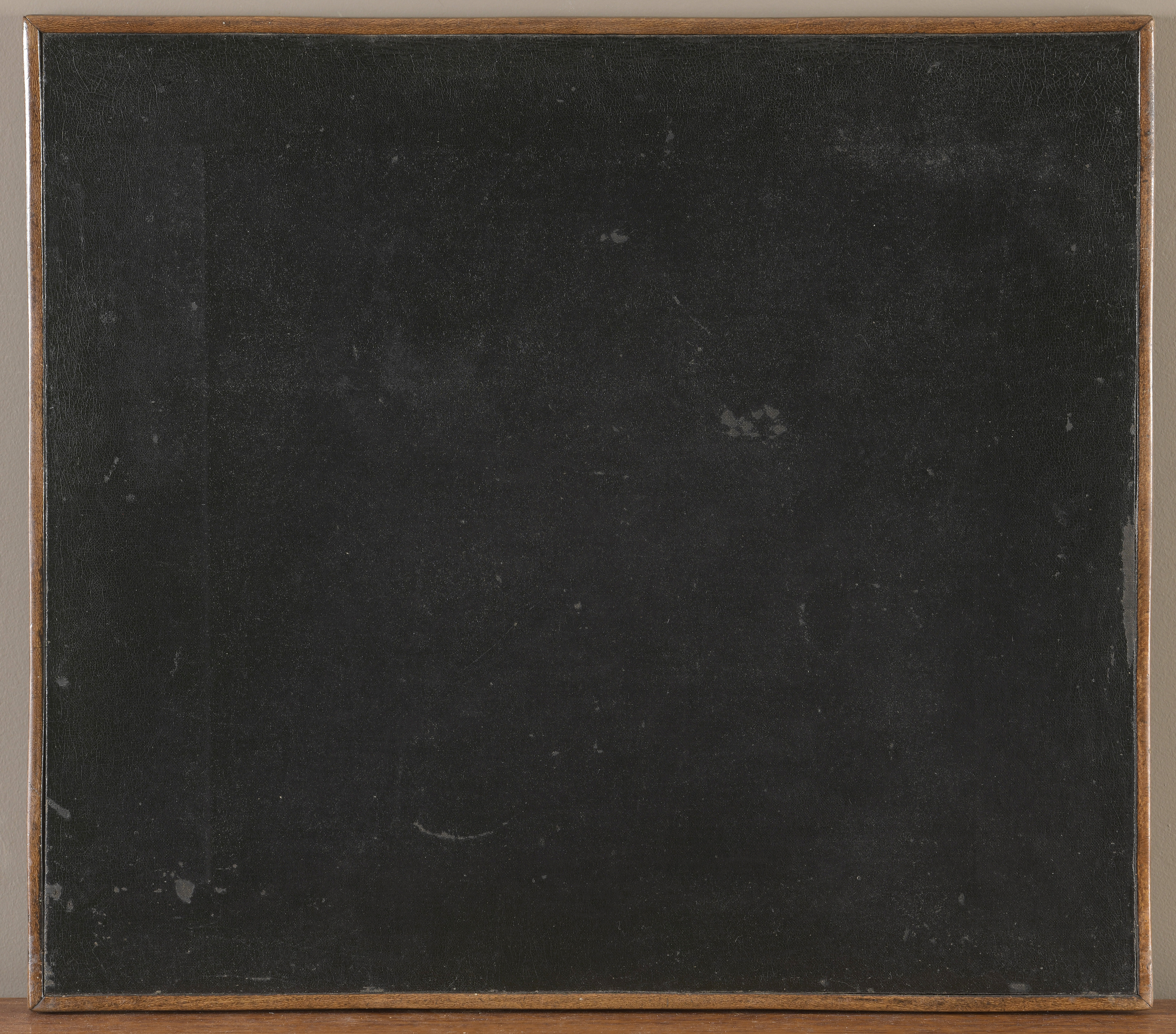
Paul Bilhaud, Combat de nègres pendant la nuit, 1882

Paul Bilhaud (31 December 1854 – 8 January 1933) was a French playwright and librettist. An old friend of the author Alphonse Allais, he is remembered along his friend as a forerunner of minimalism with his painting Combat de nègres pendant la nuit ("Battle of Negroes during the night"), displayed for the first time in 1882, more than thirty years before the Black Square by Kazimir Malevich. It had been missing since that time until it was rediscovered in a private collection in 2017–2018. It has been classified as a National Treasure by the French state. Bilhaud was not the first to create an all-black artwork: for example, Robert Fludd published an image of "Darkness" in his 1617 book on the origin and structure of the cosmos; and Bertall published his black Vue de La Hogue (effet de nuit) in 1843. Inspired by Bilhaud, Alphonse Allais proposed other monochrome paintings, published in his Album primo-avrilesque in 1897.

== Works ==
=== Theatre ===
- La Première Querelle, domestic scene, éditions Barbré, 1881, a play created at the Théâtre du Gymnase, 1 September 1881.
- La Soirée du seize, comedy de salon in one act, éditions Librairie théâtrale, 1884.
- Première ivresse (in collaboration with Julien Berr de Turique) créée à l’Odéon, 22 September 1885.
- Bigame, comedy in three acts (in collaboration with Albert Barré), éditions Librairie théâtrale, 1886.
- La Courtisane de Corinthe (in collaboration with Michel Carré).
- Ma Bru ! (in collaboration with Michel Carré), performed at the Théâtre de l'Odéon in 1898.
- Le Gant, comedy in one act (in collaboration with Maurice Hennequin), éditions P.-V. Stock, 1905.
- L’Âme des héros, (in collaboration with Michel Carré) one-act play in verses, created at the Comédie-Française, 6 June 1907.
- L'École des bavards ou Parler, scene in three periods, éditions Georges Ondet, 1919.
- La Douche, comedy de salon, played by Coquelin cadet and Melle Scellier, éditions Librairie Théâtrale, 1884.
- Gustave !, comedy de salon in one act
- Heureuse !, comedy in three acts (in collaboration with Maurice Hennequin)
- La Famille Boléro, play in three acts
- Les Espérances, comedy in one act, in prose, Paris, Théâtre du Vaudeville, 2 September 1885
- J’attends Ernest, comedy in one act, in prose, Paris, Théâtre du Palais-Royal, 11 April 1885
- Le Papillon, comedy in one act, in verses

=== Librettos ===
- La Soubrette, operetta in one act, with Quénéhen and Rambaud (Asnières, 6 July 1891)
- Un mariage à bout portant, operetta in one act, with Remy, music by Cieutat (Scala, 16 February 1892)
- Toto, operetta in three acts, with Albert Barré, music by Antoine Banès (Théâtre des Menus-Plaisirs, 10 June 1892)
- Madame Rose, opera-comique in one act, with Albert Barré, music by Antoine Banès (Opéra-Comique, 25 September 1893)
- Nos bons chasseurs, vaudeville in three acts, with Michel Carré fils, music by Charles Lecocq (Nouveau Théâtre, 10 April 1894)
- Le Roi Frelon, operetta in three acts, with Albert Barré, music by d'Antoine Banès (Théâtre des Folies-Dramatiques, 11 April 1895)
- La Tourte, operetta in one act, music by Gaston Serpette (Asnières, 8 February 1895)
- La Jarretière, operetta in one act, with Albert Barré, music by Antoine Banès (Eldorado, 29 April 1897)
- La Fiancée du trombone à coulisse, fairly joyous symphonologue, music by Émile Pessard

=== Paintings ===
- 1882 : "Combat de nègres pendant la nuit "

== Bibliography ==
- Danto, Artur C. (2005). Unnatural Wonders or Essays from the Gap Between Art and Life. ISBN 978-0-374-28118-2.
