= The Assault (1936 film) =

1936 film

- Directed by: Pierre-Jean Ducis
- Written by: Léopold Marchand; Henri Vendresse
- Based on: The Assault by Henri Bernstein
- Produced by: Henri Ullmann
- Starring: Charles Vanel; Alice Field; Madeleine Robinson
- Cinematography: Fred Langenfeld
- Edited by: André Versein
- Music by: Henri Verdun
- Production company: Les Films Paramount
- Distributed by: Les Films Paramount
- Release date: 31 December 1936
- Running time: 73 minutes
- Country: France
- Language: French

The Assault (French: L'assaut) is a 1936 French drama film directed by Pierre-Jean Ducis and starring Charles Vanel, Alice Field and Madeleine Robinson. It is based on the 1912 play of the same title by Henri Bernstein.

It was shot at the Joinville Studios of Paramount Pictures in Paris. Location shooting took place at the National Assembly and in Blois. The film's sets were designed by the art directors Jacques-Laurent Atthalin and Henri Ménessier.

== Synopsis ==
The leader of a political party running for high office is challenged by a rival about a theft he has committed in the past.

== Cast ==
- Charles Vanel as Alexandre Mérital
- Alice Field as Renée de Rould
- André Alerme as Frépeau
- Madeleine Robinson as Georgette Mérital
- Charles Lemontier as Garancier
- Jean Joffre as Marc Label
- Philippe Janvier as Julien Mérital
- Marcel Vergne as Daniel Mérital
- Marcel Chabrier as Le préfet
- Arlette Dubreuil as Hélène
- Janine Darcey as La bonne
- Maurice Marceau as Un journaliste
- Maurice Schutz as Joseph, le majordome de Mérital

== Bibliography ==
- Goble, Alan. The Complete Index to Literary Sources in Film. Walter de Gruyter, 1999.
