= Gigolette (1937 film) =

1937 film

- Directed by: Yvan Noé
- Written by: Pierre Decourcelle (play); Pierre Maudru; Yvan Noé; Edmond Tarbé des Sablons (play)
- Produced by: Pierre Pellegrin
- Starring: Florelle; Gabriel Gabrio; Rosine Deréan
- Cinematography: Nicolas Hayer
- Edited by: Andrée Feix
- Music by: Vincent Scotto
- Production company: Les Productions Pellegrin
- Distributed by: Les Productions Pellegrin
- Release date: 19 February 1937
- Running time: 87 minutes
- Country: France
- Language: French

Gigolette is a 1937 French drama film directed by Yvan Noé and starring Florelle, Gabriel Gabrio and Rosine Deréan. The film's sets were designed by the art director Jean Douarinou.

== Cast ==
- Florelle as Zélie Vauquelin
- Gabriel Gabrio as Vauquelin
- Rosine Deréan as Geneviève de Margemont / Palote Vauquelin
- Paul Azaïs as Charles
- Colette Darfeuil as Amandine
- Jean Servais as Docteur Jacques Bernais
- Paule Andral
- Sinoël as Le garçon de café
- Georges Paulais as L'huissier
- Charlotte Lysès as Mme de Margemont
- Fréhel as La chanteuse
- Pierre Moreno as Gustave de Mauperthuis
- Rachel Devirys
- Jacques Berlioz as M. de Margemont
- Milly Mathis as La concierge
- Marguerite Moreno as La marquise de Mauperthuis
- Raymond Cordy as Le coiffeur
- Jacques Chevalier
- Hugues de Bagratide
- Nita Georges
- Charles Lemontier
- Michèle Morgan as Une soubrette
- Jean Neyris
- Madeleine Pagès
- André Roanne
- Suzanne Talba

== Bibliography ==
- Dayna Oscherwitz & MaryEllen Higgins. The A to Z of French Cinema. Scarecrow Press, 2009.
