= Paul Azaïs =

French actor (1902–1974)

- Born: 6 May 1903; Paris, France
- Died: 17 November 1974 (aged 71); Paris, France
- Occupation: Actor
- Years active: 1929–1966

Paul François Robert Azaïs (6 May 1903 – 17 November 1974) was a French film actor. He appeared in more than 110 films between 1929 and 1966.

== Selected filmography ==
- The Three Masks (1929) - Le fils Vescotelli
- Le défenseur (1930)
- Paris by Night (1930) - Bouledebois
- Montmartre (1931) - Un client de Dédé (uncredited)
- Plein la vue (1931)
- Wooden Crosses (1932) - Soldat Broucke
- Fantômas (1932) - Giroud, le mécanicien de Lord Beltham
- The Miracle Child (1932) - Ratier
- The Yellow Dog (1932) - Le marin
- L'agence O-Kay (1932) - Kokanase
- Fun in the Barracks (1932) - Croquebol
- Make-Up (1932)
- En plein dans le mille (1932) - Le gigolo
- La poule (1933) - Pascal
- The Star of Valencia (1933) - Un joueur du Trocadéro
- Pour être aimé (1933)
- The Old Devil (1933) - Jacques
- Les bleus du ciel (1933)
- The Agony of the Eagles (1933) - Le policier
- Street Without a Name (1934) - Manu
- Les Misérables (1934) - Grantaire
- The Guardian Angel (1934) - Fred
- The Concierge's Daughters (1934) - Albert
- Skylark (1934) - L'Adjudant
- Sidonie Panache (1934) - Bourrache
- Cease Firing (1934) - Tutule
- Pension Mimosas (1935) - Carlo
- King of the Camargue (1935) - Titin
- The Devil in the Bottle (1935) - Lopaka
- La rosière des Halles (1935) - Raphaël
- Lovers and Thieves (1935) - Valtier
- Divine (1935) - Victor
- The Squadron's Baby (1935) - Fouillard, le soldat au coeur tendre
- La marmaille (1935) - Pinpin
- Haut comme trois pommes (1936)
- Anne-Marie (1936) - Le boxeur
- Coup de vent (1936) - Pierre
- Moutonnet (1936) - Le garçon d'étage
- A Legionnaire (1936) - Turlot
- Au son des guitares (1936) - Pierrot
- Girls of Paris (1936) - Henri Maubert
- Nitchevo (1936) - Lemoule, un matelot
- Les petites alliées (1936) - Justin
- Gigolette (1937) - Charles
- Trois artilleurs au pensionnat (1937) - L;épicier
- Franco de port (1937) - Fernando
- Passeurs d'hommes (1937) - Arsène
- The Woman from the End of the World (1938) - Radio Molinier
- Trois dans un moulin (1938)
- Storm Over Asia (1938) - Jonny le pianiste
- Trois artilleurs en vadrouille (1938) - Le charcutier Plume
- S.O.S. Sahara (1938) - Bobby
- Les rois de la flotte (1938)
- Three Artillerymen at the Opera (1938) - Billardon
- The Corsican Brothers (1939) - André, le mauvais garçon
- Deuxième bureau contre kommandantur (1939) - Stiefel
- There's No Tomorrow (1939) - Henri
- Frères d'Afrique (1939)
- Narcisse (1940) - Crépin
- Hangman's Noose (1940) - Dollboys
- Camp Thirteen (1940) - Jean-Pierre
- White Patrol (1942) - Victor
- Forte tête (1942) - Alexandre
- À la Belle frégate (1943) - Félix
- Don't Shout It from the Rooftops (1943) - P'tit Louis
- Mon amour est près de toi (1943) - Le Frisé
- Adrien (1943) - Jules Petitpas
- Bifur 3 (1945) - André
- Destiny (1946)
- Rooster Heart (1946) - Serapain
- Chinese Quarter (1947) - Toni
- Mandrin (1947) - Trognard
- Si jeunesse savait... (1948) - Paulo
- Night Express (1948) - Un inspecteur
- Fantomas Against Fantomas (1949) - Martin
- Marlene (1949) - Le barman
- I Like Only You (1949) - Le compositeur
- Return to Life (1949) - Le capitaine (segment 4 : "Le retour de René") (uncredited)
- At the Grand Balcony (1949) - Morel
- Drame au Vel'd'Hiv' (1949) - Un inspecteur
- Amédée (1950) - Le photographe
- The Little Zouave (1950) - Adolphe
- Tuesday's Guest (1950)
- The King of the Bla Bla Bla (1950) - Bébert
- Maria of the End of the World (1951) - Le vieil homme
- The Little Cardinals (1951) - Le régisseur
- The Night Is My Kingdom (1951) - Loustaud
- Duel in Dakar (1951) - Marco
- Monsieur Octave (1951)
- Le costaud des Batignolles (1952) - Le patron du Mala-bar (uncredited)
- Le Plaisir (1952) - Le patron du bal (segment "Le Masque")
- Casque d'Or (1952) - Ponsard
- The Seven Deadly Sins (1952) - Le patron du restaurant (segment "Paresse, La / Sloth") (uncredited)
- Monsieur Taxi (1952) - Henri - le barman
- Double or Quits (1953) - Tonio
- Les amours finissent à l'aube (1953) - Lulu
- La môme vert-de-gris (1953) - Le patron du bistrot
- The Earrings of Madame de… (1953) - Le premier cocher
- Children of Love (1953) - M. Lefranc
- Minuit... Champs-Elysées (1954)
- Tempest in the Flesh (1954) - Le garagiste
- Royal Affairs in Versailles (1954) - Un révolutionnaire (uncredited)
- Les révoltés de Lomanach (1954) - Un garde
- Les Intrigantes (1954) - Le Brancardier
- Tourments (1954) - Le père Bizule, gardien de chantier
- The Women Couldn't Care Less (1954) - Guard at the Pier
- The Lovers of Marianne (1954)
- Opération tonnerre (1954)
- Sur le banc (1954) - Lacassagne
- The Infiltrator (1955) - Dominique - le 'Corse'
- Razzia sur la chnouf (1955) - Le patron du bistrot
- L'impossible Monsieur Pipelet (1955) - Le patron du bistrot (uncredited)
- Je suis un sentimental (1955) - Un inspecteur (uncredited)
- Law of the Streets (1955)
- Diary of a Bad Girl (1956) - Un joueur de poker
- Blood to the Head (1956) - Alphonse, le patron des 'Charentes'
- Les carottes sont cuites (1956)
- Bonjour Toubib (1957)
- Sénéchal the Magnificent (1957) - Le garagiste - mécanicien du car
- Miss Pigalle (1958)
- Tendre et violente Elisabeth (1960) - Le patron de la guinguette
