= The Queen of Biarritz =

1934 film

- Directed by: Jean Toulout
- Written by: Romain Coolus (play); Maurice Hennequin (play); Jean Toulout
- Starring: Alice Field; Léon Belières; Marguerite Moreno
- Cinematography: Marcel Lucien
- Music by: Germaine Raynal; Paul Rogey
- Production company: Compagnie française de distribution cinématographique
- Release date: 20 December 1934
- Country: France
- Language: French

The Queen of Biarritz (French: La reine de Biarritz) is a 1934 French comedy film directed by Jean Toulout and starring Alice Field, Léon Belières and Marguerite Moreno.

The film's sets were designed by Jean d'Eaubonne.

== Cast ==
- Alice Field as Elenita
- Léon Belières as Ramondin
- Marguerite Moreno as La mère
- André Burgère as Gaston Melville
- Renée Devilder as Marguerite Charencel
- Arlette Dubreuil as Denise
- Jean Dax as Charencel, le beau-père
- Henry Bonvallet as Comte Bolinsky
- Raoul Marco as Esteban, le mari
- Jackie Maud as La fleuriste
- Pierre Moreno as Prosper
- Jean Toulout

== Bibliography ==
- Rège, Philippe. Encyclopedia of French Film Directors, Volume 1. Scarecrow Press, 2009.
