= Mercadet =

1936 film

- Directed by: André Hugon
- Written by: Wolfgand Drews; Lassaily; Honoré de Balzac (play)
- Cinematography: Marc Bujard
- Release date: 21 August 1936
- Running time: 66 minutes
- Country: France
- Language: French

Mercadet or Le faiseur is a 1936 French comedy film directed by André Hugon and starring Paul Pauley, Janine Borelli and Philippe Janvier. It was based on an 1848 play by Honoré de Balzac. It is also known by the alternative title Le Faiseur.

== Cast ==
- Paul Pauley as Monsieur Mercadet
- Janine Borelli as Miss Julie Mercadet
- Philippe Janvier as La Brive
- Alexandre Mihalesco as Violette
- Elmire Vautier as Madame Mercadet
- Armand Larcher as Adolphe Minard
- Jean Toulout as Berchut
- Georges Bever
- Jean Diéner
- Albert Gercourt
- Irène Jeanning
- Jean Kolb
- Germaine Michel
- Emile Seylis

== See also ==
- The Lovable Cheat (1949)

== Bibliography ==
- Crisp, Colin. Genre, Myth and Convention in the French Cinema, 1929-1939. Indiana University Press, 2002.
