= Henri Verdun =

French composer

- Born: August 29, 1895; Roubaix
- Died: June 25, 1977 (aged 81)
- Other names: Henry Verdun; Maurice Castellain
- Occupation: Composer
- Years active: 1930-1958 (film)

Henri Verdun (1895–1977) was a French composer of film scores.

== Selected filmography ==
- Napoléon (1927)
- The Sweetness of Loving (1930)
- Azaïs (1931)
- Make a Living (1931)
- The Levy Department Stores (1932)
- The Lacquered Box (1932)
- Broken Wings (1933)
- The Weaker Sex (1933)
- The Flame (1936)
- Girls of Paris (1936)
- The Assault (1936)
- Boissière (1937)
- Les Disparus de Saint-Agil (1938)
- The Woman Thief (1938)
- Ernest the Rebel (1938)
- Four in the Morning (1938)
- Monsieur Breloque Has Disappeared (1938)
- Rail Pirates (1938)
- The Fatted Calf (1939)
- Camp Thirteen (1940)
- Last Adventure (1942)
- Business Is Business (1942)
- Shot in the Night (1943)
- Home Port (1943)
- The Man Without a Name (1943)
- My Last Mistress (1943)
- The Bellman (1945)
- My First Love (1945)
- Bifur 3 (1945)
- The Murderer is Not Guilty (1946)
- Distress (1946)
- The Lovers of Pont Saint Jean (1947)
- The Great Maguet (1947)
- The Fugitive (1947)
- The Ironmaster (1948)
- The Tragic Dolmen (1948)
- The Cavalier of Croix-Mort (1948)
- Monseigneur (1949)
- The Nude Woman (1949)
- The Ladies in the Green Hats (1949)
- Gigolo (1951)
- La Fugue de Monsieur Perle (1952)
- The Lovers of Midnight (1953)
- The Big Flag (1954)
- Blood to the Head (1956)
- Élisa (1957)

== Bibliography ==
- Greco, Joseph. The File on Robert Siodmak in Hollywood, 1941-1951. Universal-Publishers, 1999.
