= Philippe Janvier (actor) =

French actor

Philippe Janvier (born Jacques Philippe Nugeyre, in 1903 in Paris, died in 1967 in Cognac, Charente) was a French actor.

== Partial filmography ==
- L'ange gardien (1934)
- Adventure in Paris (1936)
- The Assault (1936)
- Mercadet (a.k.a. Le faiseur) (1936) as La Brive
- Les petites alliées (1936)
- Captain Benoit (1938)
- The Spirit of Sidi-Brahim (1939)
- The Five Cents of Lavarede (1939) as Le conspirateur
- The Atomic Monsieur Placido (1950) as L'impresario
- Three Sailors (1957)
