= Combat de nègres pendant la nuit =

Painting by Paul Bilhaud

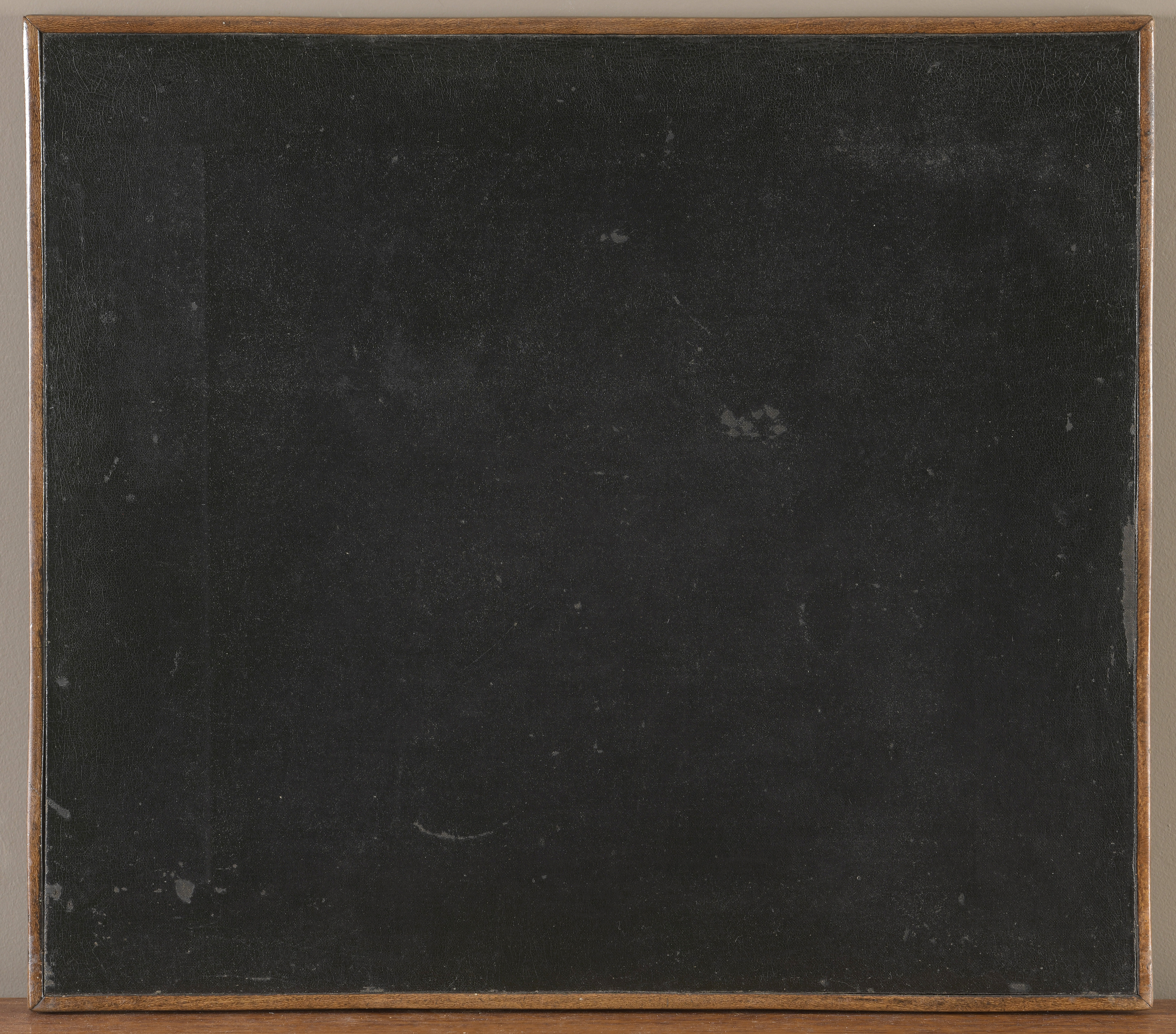
- Paul Bilhaud, Combat de nègres pendant la nuit, 1882
- Artist: Paul Bilhaud
- Year: 1882
- Medium: Oil on canvas
- Movement: Incoherents
- Dimensions: 43.5 × 49 cm

Combat de nègres pendant la nuit (French: "Battle of Negroes during the night") is a monochrome work by the French writer Paul Bilhaud (1854–1933), first shown to the public on 1 October 1882 at the inaugural exhibition of the Incoherents (French: Arts incohérents) movement in Paris. It is considered by some to be the first monochrome in the history of painting. The work is a sheet of stretched canvas painted entirely black. Long thought to be lost, it was rediscovered in 2018 and classified a French national treasure in 2021.

== History ==
On 1 October 1882, the publisher Jules Lévy organised the first exhibition of the Incohérents at his home at 4 rue Antoine-Dubois in Paris. For the occasion, a supplement of the Montmartre journal Le Chat noir served as the exhibition catalogue, listing 159 works, in which the work appears as number 15, attributed to "Bilhaud (Paul), poète, né à Nohaut, élève de Gray …". The exhibition, which lasted barely four hours, was noteworthy and had international resonance. The work was thought to be lost after the exhibition.

In 2018, the gallerist and art expert Johann Naldi found and identified 17 previously unknown works of the Incohérents in a private collection, among them Combat de nègres pendant la nuit. On 7 May 2021 the French Ministry of Culture classified 19 works of the movement as national treasures by refusing to grant them an export licence, describing the painting as "the first monochrome in the history of painting" and noting that it had been "known as far as the Russia of Malevich".

== Description ==
The rediscovery of the work made it possible to establish its technical nature. It is a painting consisting of a sheet of canvas coated with black paint, stretched on a frame, measuring 43.5 by 49 cm including its frame. The work and the exhibition labels present on its reverse were subjected to scientific analyses that revealed no suspicious chemical or structural element.

== Questions of authenticity ==
The discovery of the painting was debated by a number of art historians. On 15 April 2022 the newspaper Libération published an investigation reporting these questionings, which remained without a definitive conclusion. In response, Naldi published a right of reply arguing that the works had been classified as national treasures only after a lengthy verification process that, he said, had involved no fewer than 15 curators of the Musée d'Orsay, the entire consultative commission of national treasures, two restorers mandated by Orsay, and an engineer of the Centre de Recherche et de Restauration des Musées de France. A week after the Libération investigation, the essayist Michel Onfray, a supporter of Naldi's discovery, regarded the casting of doubt on the work's authenticity as "negationism". The monochrome specialist Denys Riout, for his part, stressed that seeing the actual objects had changed the way the works were understood.

== Relation to Malevich ==
The French Ministry of Culture noted, in classifying the work, that it had long enjoyed a renown that made it "known as far as the Russia of Kazimir Malevich". The art historian Andrew Spira, a graduate of the Courtauld Institute and a former curator at the Victoria and Albert Museum, has supported the hypothesis that the painting was a precedent to Malevich's Black Square, reproducing it in an essay on black squares before Malevich. In a peer-reviewed study of the Incohérents, Greg Kerr identifies the 1882 black canvas as a precedent for Alphonse Allais's monochrome work, while cautioning, following Michael Corris, against seeing Allais's monograph as a forerunner of the abstract monochromes of Malevich and Yves Klein, since this would be to overlook its ironic intent. The art critic Arthur C. Danto discussed the 1882 canvas in relation to Malevich's Black Square, arguing that, while it was not a difference that met the eye, a square version of Bilhaud's painting might have looked exactly like Malevich's, and that Black Square "is not a picture", belonging to the history of monochrome paintings only in the most external and superficial respect.

Bilhaud's canvas is not the first all-black artwork: for example, Robert Fludd published an image of "Darkness" in his 1617 book on the origin and structure of the cosmos, Laurence Sterne printed a page of solid black ink in the first volume of his 1759 novel Tristram Shandy, and Bertall published his black Vue de la Hougue (effet de nuit) in 1843. The work is nonetheless cited as a forerunner of Minimalism, more than 30 years before the Black Square by Malevich.

== Exhibitions ==
After being shown at the Olympia on 19 April 2022, where the last Incohérents exhibition had taken place in 1893, the monochrome of Paul Bilhaud was given its world premiere in the exhibition "Henri de Toulouse Lautrec. Parigi 1881-1901" at the Palazzo Roverella in Rovigo, Italy, in February 2024.

== Bibliography ==
- Danto, Arthur C. (2005). Unnatural Wonders or Essays from the Gap Between Art and Life. Farrar, Straus and Giroux. ISBN 978-0-374-28118-2.
