= Make-Up (1932 film) =

1932 film directed by Karl Anton

- Directed by: Karl Anton
- Written by: Howard Estabrook; Saint-Granier; Paul Schiller; George Manker Watters
- Based on: The Feeder by Mildred Cram
- Starring: Robert Burnier; Rosine Deréan; Edwige Feuillère
- Cinematography: Otto Heller
- Music by: Marcel Lattès
- Production company: Les Studios Paramount
- Distributed by: Les Studios Paramount
- Release date: 12 November 1932
- Running time: 80 minutes
- Country: France
- Language: French

Make-Up (French: Maquillage) is a 1932 French drama film directed by Karl Anton and starring Robert Burnier, Rosine Deréan and Edwige Feuillère. It was produced at the Joinville Studios in Paris by the French subsidiary of Paramount Pictures. It is a remake of the 1930 American film Behind the Make-Up, which was itself based on a short story by Mildred Cram.

== Cast ==
- Saint-Granier as Lucien Leroy
- Robert Burnier as Bertini
- Rosine Deréan as Ginette
- Paul Pauley as Eugène Tapin
- Edwige Feuillère as Ketty
- Toto as André
- Paul Azaïs
- Paul Dullac
- Germaine Michel
- Yvonne Yma
- Milly Mathis
- Henri Vilbert
- Henri Jullien
- Georges Cahuzac
- Micheline Bernard
- Yvonne Louis
- Jeanne Fusier-Gir

== Bibliography ==
- Bessy, Maurice & Chirat, Raymond. Histoire du cinéma français: 1929-1934. Pygmalion, 1988.
- Crisp, Colin. Genre, Myth and Convention in the French Cinema, 1929-1939. Indiana University Press, 2002.
- Goble, Alan. The Complete Index to Literary Sources in Film. Walter de Gruyter, 1999.
- Rège, Philippe. Encyclopedia of French Film Directors, Volume 1. Scarecrow Press, 2009.
