= Vertigo (1935 film) =

1935 film

- Directed by: Paul Schiller
- Written by: Paul Fékété; René Guissart; Paul Schiller
- Based on: Vertigo by Charles Méré
- Produced by: Fred Bacos
- Starring: Alice Field; André Burgère; Jean Toulout
- Cinematography: André Dantan; Enzo Riccioni
- Production company: Fox Film Europa
- Distributed by: Société Anonyme Française Fox Film
- Release date: 21 February 1935
- Country: France
- Language: French

Vertigo (French: Le vertige) is a 1935 French drama film directed by Paul Schiller and starring Alice Field, André Burgère and Jean Toulout. It is based on a 1922 play of the same title by Charles Méré, which had previously been made into the 1926 silent film Le Vertige directed by Marcel L'Herbier. The film's sets were designed by the art director René Renoux. It was produced and distributed by the French subsidiary of Fox Film.

== Synopsis ==
Natacha Mikailovna married General Mikailoff after he shot and killed her lover during the Russian Civil War. Now White Russian émigrés living in Paris, she encounters a man who strangely resembles her dead former lover.

== Cast ==
- Alice Field as Natacha Mikailovna
- André Burgère as Henri de Cassel
- Jean Toulout as Général Mikailoff
- Arletty as Emma
- Rachel Devirys as La princesse Koupiska
- Paul Pauley as Charançon
- Pierre Moreno as Le premier valet
- Micheline Bernard as L'arpète
- Andrews Engelmann as Petrov
- René Génin as Le deuxième valet

== Bibliography ==
- Bessy, Maurice & Chirat, Raymond. Histoire du cinéma français: 1935-1939. Pygmalion, 1986.
- Crisp, Colin. Genre, Myth and Convention in the French Cinema, 1929-1939. Indiana University Press, 2002.
- Rège, Philippe. Encyclopedia of French Film Directors, Volume 1. Scarecrow Press, 2009.
