= Bifur 3 =

1945 film

- Directed by: Maurice Cam
- Written by: André-Paul Antoine; Louis Poterat
- Produced by: Simon Barstoff; Jean-Pierre Frogerais
- Starring: René Dary; Raymond Aimos; Martine Carol
- Cinematography: René Gaveau; Jean Isnard
- Edited by: Jeannette Berton
- Music by: Henri Verdun
- Production company: Productions Sigma
- Distributed by: Les Films Vog
- Release date: 29 August 1945
- Running time: 102 minutes
- Country: France
- Language: French

Bifur 3 is a 1945 French drama film directed by Maurice Cam and starring René Dary, Raymond Aimos and Martine Carol. Shooting first began on the film in 1939, but delays due to the Second World War and the Occupation of France meant it wasn't completed until after the Liberation. Many of the original cast and crew were replaced. It was shot at the Photosonor Studios in Paris. The film's sets were designed by the art director Robert Dumesnil.

Bifur 3 was Martine Carol's acting debut.

== Synopsis ==
Two truck drivers pick up a woman as passenger on the road to Marseille, but are pursued by her husband.

== Cast ==
- René Dary as Georges
- Raymond Aimos as Gustave
- Martine Carol as Germaine
- Arthur Devère as Napoléon
- Robert Le Vigan as Paul
- Julien Maffre as a truck driver
- Jean Berton as Alvarez's butler
- Fernand Sardou as a truck driver
- Maurice Escande as Alvarez
- Ariane Borg as Gisèle
- Paul Azaïs as André

== Production ==
Shooting began in 1939, was interrupted in 1941; filming resumed in Paris in May 1944 and some scenes were shot on location in Marseille in August 1944.

The film's production was troubled for various reasons. On August 20, 1944, the actor Raymond Aimos, who had one of the main roles in the film, was killed during the Liberation of Paris. There was to film a few scenes that he should have appeared. The scenario was then slightly modified; the last scenes were shot in October and November 1944.

Martine Carol herself was a last minute substitute for an unknown actress who eventually declined the role; and Robert Le Vigan had fled to South America before filming was completed.

== Release ==
The film was released in France on August 29, 1945, almost exactly a year after Aimos' death. The total number of admissions in France was 1,274,116.

== Reception ==
Le Nouveau Guide des films states that "Bifur 3 is not without its charms and gives an interesting account of the world of truckers."

== Bibliography ==
- Bertin-Maghit, Jean Pierre (1980). Le cinéma français sous Vichy: les films français de 1940 à 1944 [French cinema under Vichy: French films from 1940 to 1944]. Collection Ça/cinéma, 21 (in French). Paris: Revue du Cinéma : Albatros. OCLC 6689342.
- Rège, Philippe. Encyclopedia of French Film Directors, Volume 1. Scarecrow Press, 2009.
