= Rosine Deréan =

French actress (1910–2001)

Rosine Deréan (23 February 1910 – 14 March 2001) was a French actress. She was born in Paris and died in Genille, Indre-et-Loire, France.

== Selected filmography ==
- Moon Over Morocco (1931)
- The Yellow Dog (1932)
- The Beautiful Sailor (1932)
- Make-Up (1932)
- That Scoundrel Morin (1932)
- To the Polls, Citizens (1932)
- The Two Orphans (1933)
- Gold (1934; French-language version)
- Lake of Ladies (1934)
- Merchant of Love (1935)
- Veille d'armes (1935)
- The Happy Road (1936)
- Confessions of a Cheat (1936)
- Let's Make a Dream (1936)
- Gigolette (1937)
- Arsene Lupin, Detective (1937)
- The Pearls of the Crown (1937)
- Radio Surprises (1940)
- The Murderer is Not Guilty (1946)
