= Alice Field =

French-Algerian stage and film actress

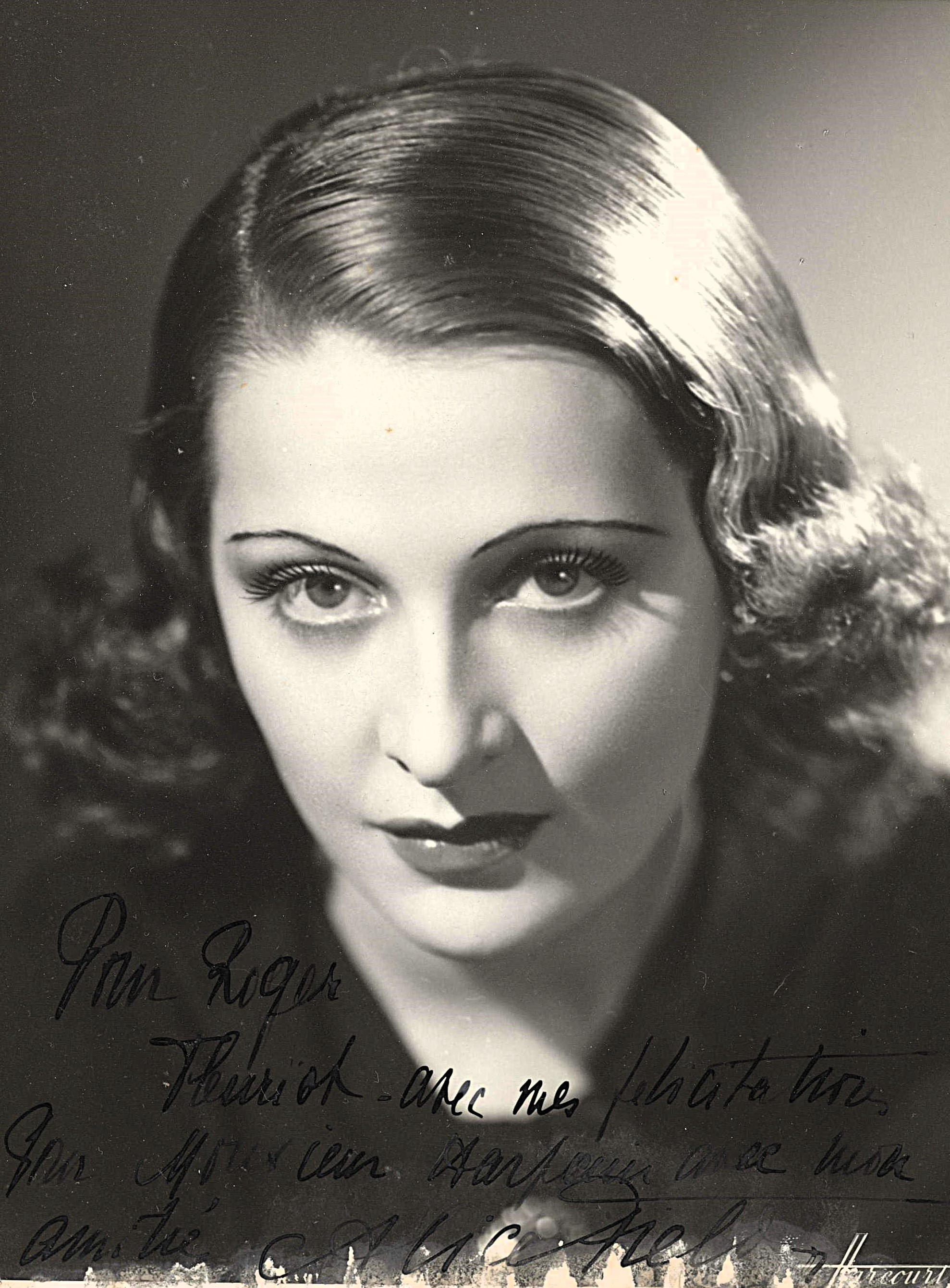
- Field in 1940
- Born: 6 March 1903; Algiers, French Algeria
- Died: 29 September 1969 (aged 66); Paris, France
- Other name: Alice Fille
- Occupation: Actor
- Years active: 1921–1969 (film)

Alice Field (1903–1969) was a French Algerian stage and film actress.

== Partial filmography ==
- Villa Destin (1921)
- Visages voilés... âmes closes (1921) - La seconde épouse de Hadji
- Atlantis (1930) - Madame Lambert
- La Maison de la Fléche (1930) - Ann Upcott
- Le refuge (1931) - Vanina
- Monsieur the Duke (1931) - Joyce Miller
- You Will Be My Wife (1932) - Alice Ménard
- The Lacquered Box (1932)
- The Nude Woman (1932) - Princesse de Chabran
- Theodore and Company (1933) - Gaby / Adrienne
- Broken Wings (1933) - Jacqueline
- The Old Devil (1933) - Hélène
- La cinquième empreinte (1934) - Florence Forestier
- The Queen of Biarritz (1934) - Elenita
- Vertigo (1935) - Natacha Mikailovna
- La rosière des Halles (1935) - Renée Dunois
- Un soir de bombe (1935) - Hélène
- The Assault (1936) - Renée de Rould
- The Lady from Vittel (1937) - Henriette Bourselet
- Police mondaine (1937) - Sylvia
- L'amour veille (1937) - Lucienne
- Neuf de trèfle (1938) - Miche Doulin
- The Tiger of Eschnapur (1938) - Sitha, la Maharanee
- The Indian Tomb (1938) - Sitha
- Camp Thirteen (1940) - Greta
- The Law of Spring (1942) - Hélène
- Finance noire (1943) - Anna
- Hyménée (1947) - Juliette
- The Little Zouave (1950) - Mme Billot
- A Certain Mister (1950) - Madame Léonard
- Darling Anatole (1954) - Caroline
- Me and the Forty Year Old Man (1965) - Mme de Trévise
- Pleins feux sur Stanislas (1965)
- Un amore (1965)
- Un garçon, une fille. Le dix-septième ciel (1966)
- La Grande Vadrouille (1966) - La prostituée (uncredited)
- Playtime (1967)

== Bibliography ==
- Goble, Alan. The Complete Index to Literary Sources in Film. Walter de Gruyter, 1999.
