= Camp Thirteen =

1940 film by Jacques Constant

- Film poster
- Directed by: Jacques Constant
- Written by: Jacques Constant
- Starring: Alice Field; Gabriel Gabrio; Paul Azaïs
- Cinematography: Nikolai Toporkoff
- Edited by: Tonka Taldy
- Music by: Henri Verdun
- Production company: Vejac
- Distributed by: Éclair-Journal
- Release date: 13 December 1940
- Country: France
- Language: French

Camp Thirteen (French: Campement 13) is a 1940 French drama film directed by Jacques Constant and starring Alice Field, Gabriel Gabrio and Paul Azaïs. It is set amongst a group of workers who are housed in a barracks known as Camp Thirteen.

== Cast ==
- Alice Field as Greta
- Gabriel Gabrio as Charles
- Paul Azaïs as Jean-Pierre
- Geneviève Picard
- Jean Clarens
- Nino Constantini
- Maurice Maillot as Petit Louis
- Henri Marchand as Un ouvrier du chantier
- Marcel Maupi as Un marinier
- Gérard Castrix
- Alexandre Rignault as Pascal
- Lucien Nat as Carlos
- Sylvia Bataille as Marie-Louise
- Eugène Stuber as Un ouvrier du chantier

== Bibliography ==
- Crisp, Colin. Genre, Myth and Convention in the French Cinema, 1929-1939. Indiana University Press, 2002.
