= Monsieur the Duke =

1931 film

- Directed by: Jean de Limur
- Written by: Jacques Natanson
- Produced by: Bernard Natan; Emile Natan
- Starring: Henri Defreyn; Alice Field; Jules Mondos
- Cinematography: Georges Asselin
- Production company: Pathé-Natan
- Distributed by: Pathé Consortium Cinéma
- Release date: 27 February 1931
- Running time: 85 minutes
- Country: France
- Language: French

Monsieur the Duke (French: Monsieur le duc) is a 1931 French comedy film directed by Jean de Limur and starring Henri Defreyn, Alice Field and Jules Mondos. The film's sets were designed by the art director Guy de Gastyne.

== Cast ==
- Henri Defreyn as Le duc Philippe de Latour-Maubert
- Alice Field as Joyce Miller
- Jules Mondos as Hector - l'évêque
- Suzanne Devoyod as La marquise de Luzançon
- Sylvio De Pedrelli as Demetrios Platinopoulos
- Stella Arbenina as Mrs. Miller
- Guy Favières as James
- Héléna Manson as La secrétaire
- Teddy Dargy as Hélène de Luzançon
- Louis Vonelly as Henri de Luzançon
- Albert Bras as Pierre - le domestique
- Raymond Cordy as L'annonceur à la réception
- Lucien Dayle as Sartoria - l'antiquaire

== Bibliography ==
- Bessy, Maurice & Chirat, Raymond. Histoire du cinéma français: 1929-1934. Pygmalion, 1988.
- Crisp, Colin. Genre, Myth and Convention in the French Cinema, 1929-1939. Indiana University Press, 2002.
- Rège, Philippe. Encyclopedia of French Film Directors, Volume 1. Scarecrow Press, 2009.
