= Lucien Dayle =

French actor (1871–1952)

- Born: 9 May 1871; Paris, France
- Died: 2 July 1952 (aged 81); Paris, France
- Occupation: Actor
- Years active: 1930–1940 (film)

Lucien Dayle (1871–1952) was a French stage and film actor. He made his screen debut in 1930 and often played supporting roles in films produced by L'Alliance Cinématographique Européenne.

== Selected filmography ==
- The Polish Jew (1931)
- Monsieur the Duke (1931)
- The Star of Valencia (1933)
- Goodbye, Beautiful Days (1933)
- Night in May (1934)
- Vers l'abîme (1934)
- The Green Domino (1935)
- The Decoy (1935)
- Royal Waltz (1936)
- The Call of Life (1937)
- Lady Killer (1937)
- Abused Confidence (1938)
- The Mondesir Heir (1940)

== Bibliography ==
- Flowers, John and Frizler, Paul. Psychotherapists on Film, 1899–1999: A Worldwide Guide to Over 5000 Films, Volume 1. McFarland, 2004.
- Guillaume-Grimaud, Geneviève. Le cinéma du Front populaire. Lherminier, 1986.
