= Run Away Mr. Perle =

- Directed by: Pierre Gaspard-Huit
- Written by: Loïc Le Gouriadec; Roger Richebé
- Produced by: Films Roger Richebé
- Starring: Noël-Noël
- Cinematography: Jean Bachelet
- Edited by: Yvonne Martin
- Music by: Henri Verdun
- Distributed by: Films Roger Richebé
- Release date: 12 December 1952
- Running time: 100 minutes
- Country: France
- Language: French

Run Away Mr. Perle (French title La Fugue de Monsieur Perle) is a French comedy film from 1952, directed by Pierre Gaspard-Huit, written by Loïc Le Gouriadec, starring Noël-Noël and featuring Louis de Funès.

== Cast ==
- Noël-Noël: Monsieur Bernard Perle (the baker)
- Arlette Poirier: Maud (the allegedly suicidal woman)
- Marie Glory: Juliette Perle (Bernard's wife)
- Gaston Orbal: Norbert (Juliet's cousin, the freeloader)
- Simone Paris: Béatrice Dupont-Vallier (the man who suffers with amnesia)
- Jean Galland: Doctor Briquet (the psychiatrist)
- Jean Toulout: Adrien Bontoux
- Paul Amiot: the police inspector
- Paul Faivre: the coffeehouse keeper in Meung-sur-Loire
- Jean Barrère: the medical assistant
- Paul Ville: the postman
- Eugène Yvernes: Joseph Corbin (the notary)
- Marcel Rouze: a regular of the bistro in Meung-sur-Loire
- Jean Daurand: the cleaner of tiles of the psychiatric hospital
- Marcel Delaitre: the bistro keeper in Romainville
- Georgette Anys: the wife of the bistro keeper in Romainville
- Sophie Mallet: the housemaid working for the parish
- Charles Lemontier: the doctor
- Luce Fabiole: Mrs Fournier
- Louis de Funès: the crazy guy trying to catch fish in a wash-bowl
