= Gabriel Gabrio =

French actor (1887–1946)

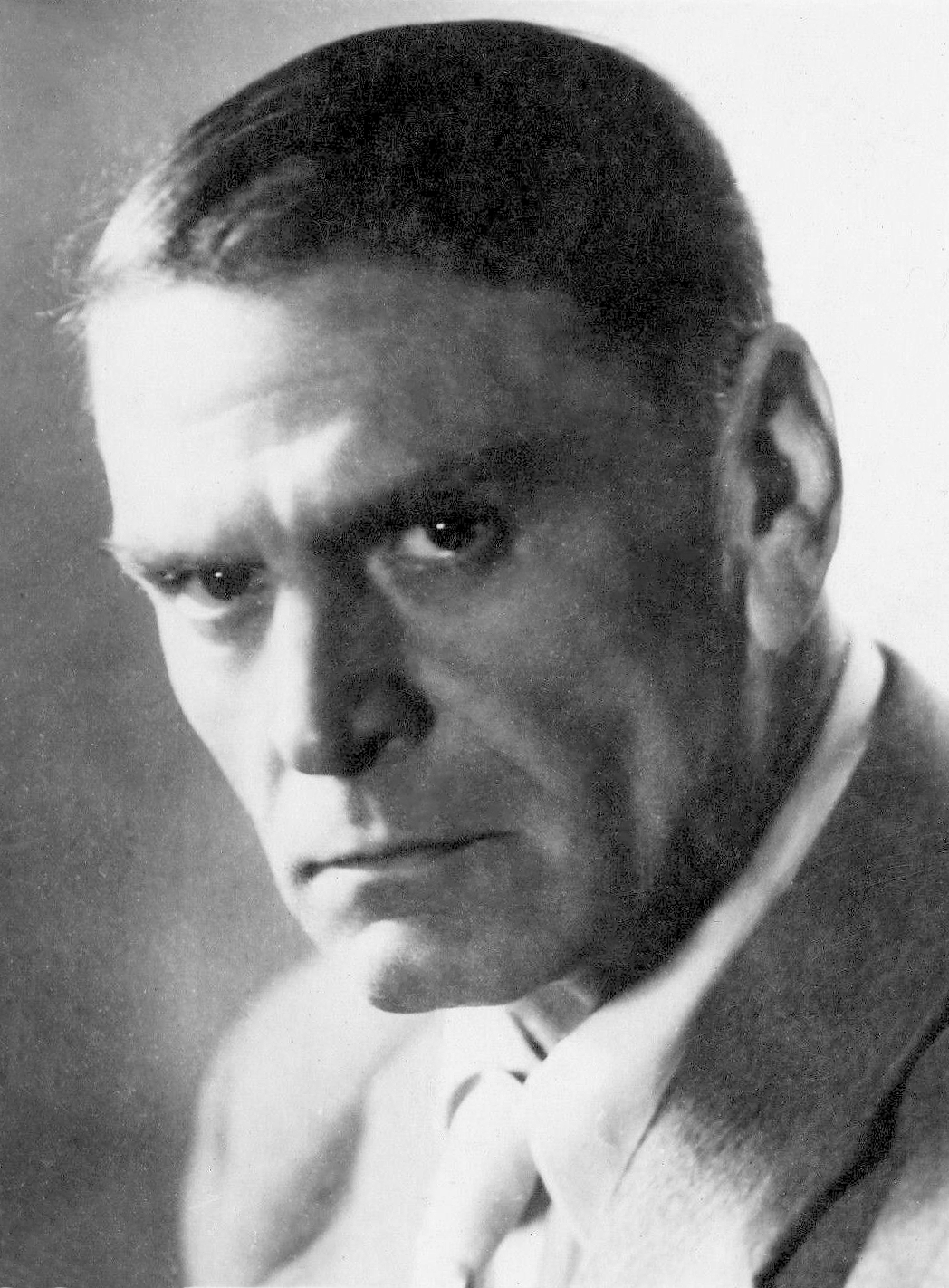
- Gabriel Gabrio in 1938
- Born: Édouard Gabriel Lelièvre; 13 January 1887; Reims, Marne, France
- Died: 31 October 1946 (aged 59); Berchères-sur-Vesgre, Eure-et-Loir, France
- Occupation: Actor
- Years active: 1920–1943

Gabriel Gabrio (born Édouard Gabriel Lelièvre; 13 January 1887 – 31 October 1946) was a French stage and film actor whose career began in cinema in the silent film era of the 1920s and spanned more than two decades. Gabrio is possibly best remembered for his roles as Jean Valjean in the 1925 Henri Fescourt-directed adaptation of Victor Hugo's Les Misérables, Cesare Borgia in the 1935 Abel Gance-directed biopic Lucrèce Borgia and as Carlos in the 1937 Julien Duvivier-directed gangster film Pépé le Moko, opposite Jean Gabin.

== Biography ==
=== Early years ===
Gabriel Gabrio was born Édouard Gabriel Lelièvre in Reims, France as the youngest of sixteen children. Gabrio's father worked for the Pommery Champagne cellars. At a young age he developed a keen interest in puppet theater. As a teen, Gabrio grew to an impressive height of 6 feet 2 inches and after a stint as an apprentice glass window painter, set his sights on a career as a stage actor.

At the out break of World War I, the blue-eyed Gabrio enlisted in the French Army and served four years during the hostilities. After being demobilized, Gabrio relocated to Paris where he performed in such theaters as the Gaîté Rochechouart, the Théâtre des Ambassadeurs, the Comédie Montaigne and the Odéon in roles by George Bernard Shaw and William Shakespeare, among others.

=== Film career ===
Gabrio made his film debut in the 1920 Germaine Dulac-directed film La fête espagnole (English release title: Spanish Fiesta). He was cast by film director Henri Fescourt to appear as Jean Valjean, the literary protagonist in the 1925 film adaptation of the Victor Hugo novel Les Misérables, whose decades-long struggle with the law for stealing bread during a time of economic and social depression is chronicled. Gabrio's appearance in the film catapulted him to stardom.

In 1927, Gabrio began appearing in international films, such as 1927's Georg Jacoby-directed German film Der Faschingskönig, and in 1929 Gabrio made his first and only English language talkie The Inseparables, directed by Adelqui Migliar and John Stafford.

Gabrio's career flourished in France into the 1930s and is possibly best recalled for his roles such as Carlos, the gangster cohort of actor Jean Gabin's character Pépé le Moko in the 1937 film directed by Julien Duvivier. The film would become an international success and remade in America in 1938 as Algiers, starring Charles Boyer and Hedy Lamarr, and again in 1948 as a musical entitled Casbah, starring Tony Martin and Yvonne de Carlo.

As the 1940s began and Europe was thrust into the World War II, Gabriel Gabrio's film career remained intact in war-torn France. In 1942 he appeared in the Marcel Carné-directed and Jacques Prévert and Pierre Laroche-penned Les Visiteurs du Soir as the executioner, opposite Arletty and Marie Déa. The film, which debuted on 5 December 1942 during the Nazi occupation of France, is an allegory of the eternal struggle between good and evil as fourteenth-century lovers defy the Devil. The film was released under the English title The Devil's Envoys to American audiences in 1947.

=== Death ===
In 1943 Gabrio's health declined and he retired to the village of Berchères-sur-Vesgre in Eure-et-Loir. He died there in 1946 at age 59. The village has since named a street after him in his honor.

== Partial filmography ==
- La fête espagnole (1920) (English release title: Spanish Fiesta)
- Les Misérables (1925) - Jean Valjean
- A Son from America (1926) - Léon Verton
- Le juif errant (1926) - Dagobert
- Captain Rascasse (1927) - 'Capitaine' Rascasse
- Antoinette Sabrier (1927) - Germain Sabrier
- The Duel (1927) - Debreole
- The Joker (1928) - Sir Herbert Powder
- The King of Carnival (1928) - Der Generalkonsul
- Five Anxious Days (1928) - General Vorileff
- The Inseparables (1929) - Pietro
- Fécondité (1929) (English release title: Fecundity) - Mathieu Froment
- La bodega (1930) (English release title: Wine Cellars) - Fermin
- Une belle garce (1930) - Rabbas le dompteur
- L'Homme qui assassina (1931) - Sir Archibald Falkland
- The King of Paris (1931) - Rascol
- La lettre (1931) - Philipp Bennett
- Les croix de bois (1932) (English release title: Wooden Crosses) - Sulphart
- Au nom de la loi (1932) (English release title: In the Name of the Law) - Amédée
- The Wandering Beast (1932) - Gregory
- Affaire classée (1932, Short) (aka Le coup de minuit, French reissue title) - Le patron du café
- Coeurs joyeux (1932) - Olivier
- Les deux orphelines (1933) (aka Frochard et les deux orphelines, English release title: The Two Orphans) - Jacques
- Les requins du pétrole (1933) (English release title: The Oil Sharks) - James Godfrey
- Street Without a Name (1934) - Fiocle
- The Devil in the Bottle (1935) - Mounier
- Le baron tzigane (1935) (English release title: Gypsy Baron) - Koloman Szupan
- Lucrezia Borgia (1935) - César Borgia
- Cavalerie légère (1935) - Chérubini
- Sous les yeux d'occident (1936) (aka Razumov) - Nikita
- Pépé le Moko (1937) - Carlos
- Gigolette (1937) - Vauquelin
- Wells in Flames (1937) - Korsoum
- Regain (1937) (English release title: Harvest) - Panturle
- Giuseppe Verdi (1938) (English release title: The Life of Giuseppe Verdi) - Honoré De Balzac
- Deuxième bureau contre kommandantur (1939) - Heim
- Le corsaire (1939)
- Campement 13 (1940) (English release title: Camp Thirteen) - Charles
- Les visiteurs du soir (1942) (English release title: The Devil's Envoys) - Le bourreau
- Le val d'enfer (1943) - Noël Bienvenu (final film role)
