= Passionnément =

1926 operetta by André Messager

Passionnément!
- Operetta by André Messager
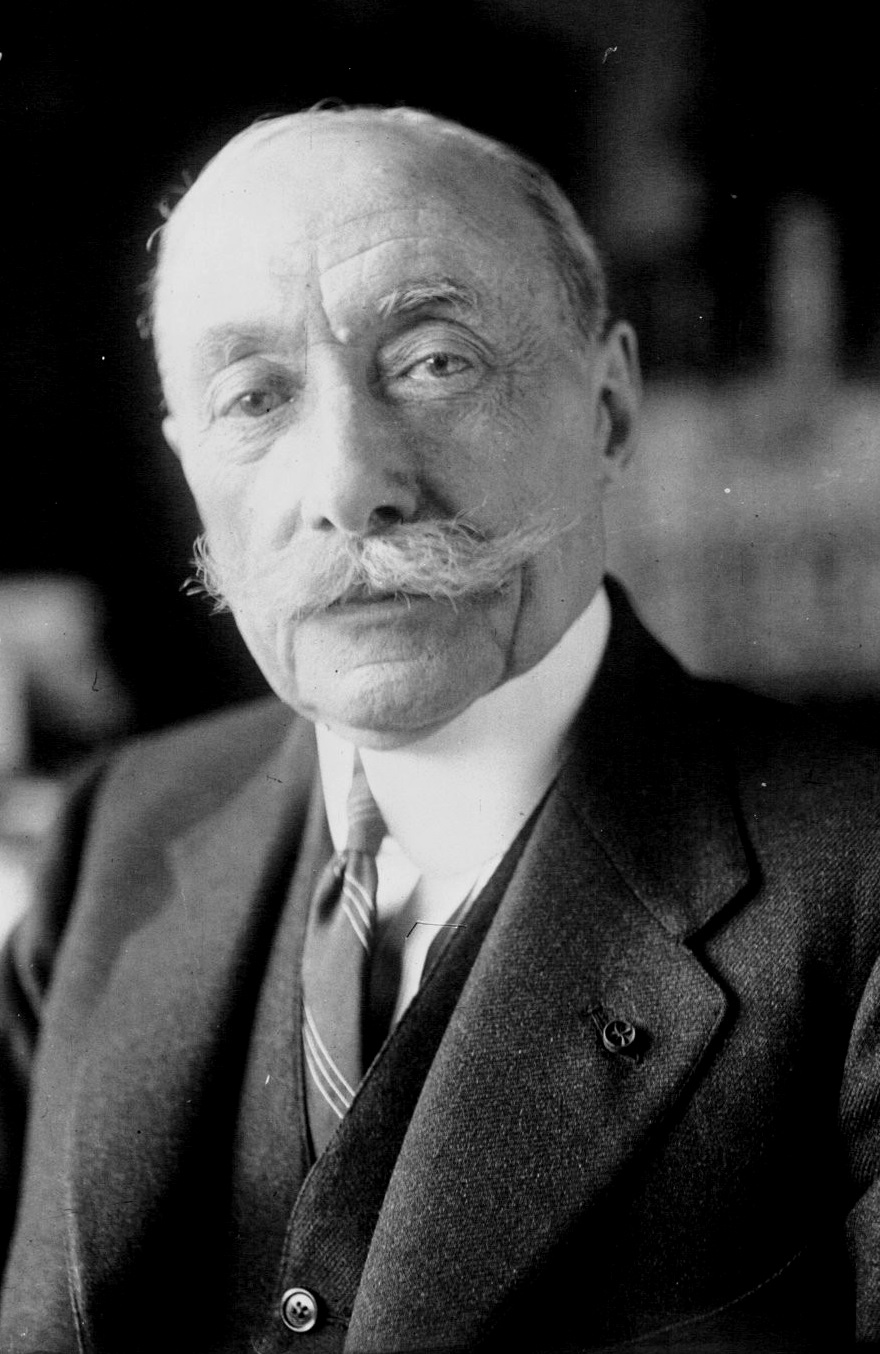
- André Messager in 1921
- Librettist: Maurice Hennequin
- Language: French
- Premiere: 16 January 1926; Théâtre de la Michodière, Paris

Passionnément! (Passionately) is a comédie musicale in three acts with music by André Messager to a French libretto by Maurice Hennequin and lyrics by Albert Willemetz. The title comes from the refrain of a waltz-song in the second act. It premiered on 16 January 1926 at the Théâtre de la Michodière in Paris.

== Performance history ==
In recent years performances have taken place in Marseille and Rennes (2003) and Aubagne (2009).

== Roles ==
Role	Voice type	Premiere Cast 16 January 1926 (Conductor: André Messager)
William Stevenson	baritone	René Koval
Robert Perceval	tenor	Géo Bury
Captain Harris	baritone	Lucien Baroux
Le Barrois	baritone	Charles Lorrain
John		Julien Carette
Ketty	mezzo-soprano	Jeanne Saint Bonnet
Julia	soprano	Denise Grey
Hélène	mezzo-soprano	Renée Duler

== Synopsis ==
Act 1

On board Stevenson’s yacht Arabella

Stevenson, a tough American businessman arrives at Trouville with his beautiful wife Ketty, her young Canadian maid Julia and the Captain Harris. He is there to buy land in Colorado – at a knock-down price - which a young Frenchman Robert Perceval has inherited, and who doesn’t realize that the oil may be found on the land. Distrustful of Frenchmen, Stevenson makes his wife Ketty (a former music-hall star) to show herself in public as an old woman, with white hair and tinted glasses; he forces her to swear this on the Bible. Robert comes on board, along with his friend Le Barrois and his wife Hélène, Robert’s jealous mistress, who is reassured by the sight of an old woman in glasses. Later, Ketty, without her disguise, meets Robert, and pretends to be the niece (Marguerite) of the brutish and teetotal Stevenson; they begin to fall in love.

Act 2

Trouville, in an elegant salon of the Villa des Roses

The yacht has had to be put into dry dock for repair. The visitors stay meanwhile in the Villa. Ketty confides in Julia her love for Robert. Stevenson is anxious to get the contract signed as soon as possible. Just as Robert is about to do so, he receives a note from 'Marguerite' warning him of underhand goings-on. So Robert stops signing, and Stevenson angrily goes off to the Casino. Robert wonders if Marguerite loves him and the act closes with them in each other's arms.

Act 3

The next day

Julia hopes that just as her mistress has been blessed in love, so she will be. Stevenson returns home from the casino where he had discovered the delights of champagne. The three bottles have also made him become kind, considerate – and aware of the beauty of Julia… The two lovers take advantage of this change, and get Stevenson to reveal the riches of the Colorado terrain, and to divorce Ketty so that she and Robert can get married.

== Recordings ==
Various excerpts were recorded in 1932 including some by members of the original cast. The same year saw a film version produced by René Guissart.

- Passionnément - recorded in Paris in July 1964, with the Orchestre Lyrique de l'O.R.T.F. conducted by Jean-Paul Kreder, with Lina Dachary (Ketty), Christiane Arbell (Hélène), Claudine Collart (Julia), Aimé Doniat (Perceval), Dominique Tirmont, Gérard Friedmann, Hiéronimus and René Lénoty. Gaîté Lyrique/Musidisc, 1992
- Passionnément - recorded at the Prinzregententheater, Munich on 11, 12 and 13 December 2020, with the Münchner Rundfunkorchester, conducted by Stefan Blunier, with Véronique Gens (Ketty), Étienne Dupuis (Perceval), Nicole Car (Julia), Eric Huchet (Stevenson), Chantal Santon Jeffrey (Hélène), Armando Noguera (Harris). Bru Zane, 1 CD, 2021
