= Masanori Ashida =

Japanese photographer

Masanori Ashida (芦田 昌憲, Ashida Masanori; born 1945) is a Japanese photographer.

== Collections ==
Ashida's work is included in the collection of the Tokyo Photographic Art Museum, the Museum of Contemporary Art Tokyo,
