= Tae Ashida =

Japanese fashion designer

Tae Ashida (芦田 多恵; born July 3, 1964) is a well-known fashion designer who has designed many uniforms in high-profile businesses and venues across Japan. She is the daughter of Japanese fashion designer Jun Ashida who at one point of his career was the dressmaker of Empress Michiko.

== Biography ==
Born in 1964 in Tokyo, Tae is the second daughter of Jun Ashida. After graduating from high school at Institut Le Rosey in Switzerland, Tae went on to graduate from the Apparel Design department at The Rhode Island School of Design as a Bachelor of Fine Arts.

In 1991, she debuted as an independent designer for Miss Ashida and presently is an active designer in her father's company and is being groomed to take over her father's business. Tae has also designed uniforms for the female members of the Tokyo Trust Bank (UFJ Trust Bank), performers at Tokyo's Disney Resort and the uniforms for SK-II, Max Factor's top brand in Asia.
