= Jean Isnard =

French cinematographer

- Born: 27 July 1901; Paris, France
- Died: 23 September 1976 (aged 75); Paris, France
- Occupation: Cinematographer
- Years active: 1928-1963 (film)

Jean Isnard (27 July 1901 – 23 September 1976) was a French cinematographer.

== Selected filmography ==
- Coquecigrole (1931)
- To the Polls, Citizens (1932)
- Colomba (1933)
- Broken Wings (1933)
- Mademoiselle Josette, My Woman (1933)
- One Night's Secret (1934)
- The Squadron's Baby (1935)
- The Mysteries of Paris (1935)
- The Imberger Mystery (1935)
- The Lover of Madame Vidal (1936)
- Temptation (1936)
- The Flame (1936)
- The Green Jacket (1937)
- Women's Prison (1938)
- Night in December (1940)
- Madame Sans-Gêne (1941)
- Chiffon's Wedding (1942)
- Sideral Cruises (1942)
- The Man Who Played with Fire (1942)
- Domino (1943)
- Marie-Martine (1943)
- Bifur 3 (1945)
- The Misfortunes of Sophie (1946)
- The Sea Rose (1946)
- Coincidences (1947)
- Unvanquished City (1950)
- Miracles Only Happen Once (1951)
- Love, Madame (1952)
- A Woman's Treasure (1953)
- Checkerboard (1959)

== Bibliography ==
- Martin O'Shaughnessy. Jean Renoir. Manchester University Press, 2000.
