= Jun Ashida =

Japanese fashion designer (1930–2018)

- 芦田 淳
- Born: August 21, 1930; Jeonju, Jeollabuk-do, Chosen
- Died: October 20, 2018 (aged 88); Tokyo, Kantō, Japan
- Known for: Fashion design
- Children: Tae Ashida
- Honours: Purple Ribbon Medal; Order of the Rising Sun

Jun Ashida (芦田 淳) (21 August 1930 – 20 October 2018) was a Japanese fashion designer. Born in Jeonju, Jeollabuk-do, Chosen, he began studying under illustrator Jun'ichi Nakahara. After gaining experience as a consulting designer, Ashida created his first fashion label in 1963, which would later be named after him. From 1966 to 1976, he served as the personal designer for Empress Michiko. Throughout his career, Ashida designed for royalty, sports teams, and companies. His daughter, Tae Ashida, also became a fashion designer.

For his contributions to fashion, Ashida received Japan's Purple Ribbon Medal in 1991. He died from pneumonia on 20 October 2018.

== Life and career ==
Jun Ashida was born in Jeonju on 21 August 1930 as the youngest of seven other siblings. His father, ethnically Japanese, was a practicing doctor.

Ashida first became interested in fashion design when he saw the clothes that one of his older brothers had brought back from a trip to the United States. After graduating high school, he learnt design from Jun'ichi Nakahara, a fashion artist and graphic designer. In 1960, he became a consulting designer for both the department store Takashimaya, as well as fiber manufacturer Teijin. Three years later, Ashida and his wife, Tomoko, launched their first clothing label Teru kōbō (テル工房) in 1963. This label would later turn into the "Jun Ashida" brand. The designer presented his first fashion collection in 1964.

Starting from 1966, Ashida became the personal designer for Empress Michiko, an appointment that lasted for ten years. This opportunity with the Imperial House of Japan came when he first tailored a suit for a young Akihito, who was a Crown Prince at the time. After departing from his role with the Imperial House of Japan in 1976, Ashida presented his first Paris collection the following year. The designer opened a boutique in Paris in 1989 at 34 Faubourg Saint-Honore.

Ashida's hand in designing for royalty extended beyond Empress Michiko. He also designed dresses for a then-Crown Princess Masako to wear during her wedding in 1993. Queen Rania of Jordan also enlisted the help of Ashida for dresses that she wore during her 1999 state visit to Japan. Ashida also created the designs of several uniforms over the course of his career. He designed the official uniforms of the Japanese national teams for the 1994 Asian Games held in Hiroshima, as well as the 1996 Summer Olympics in Atlanta. He also made his services available to companies like All Nippon Airways, who enlisted him to design their company outfits.

As part of his efforts to help future generations, Ashida created the Ashida Fund in 1994. The Ashida Fund provides the monetary prize for the Jun Ashida Award, a Japan Science and Technology Agency honor given to either a female researcher making notable contributions in sustainability research, or to an organization supporting female researchers.

== Personal life and death ==
Ashida had two children. His second daughter, Tae Ashida, also became a fashion designer.

On 20 October 2018, Ashida died from pneumonia at his home in Tokyo.

== Awards ==
For his contributions to fashion, Ashida was awarded a purple ribbon Medal of Honor by the Japanese government in 1991. He was also conferred the third class of the Order of the Rising Sun in 2006. Ashida was similarly a recipient of the French Ordre national du Mérite in 2000.
