= Mitake Castle =

Japanese Castle

- 三岳城
- Hamamatsu, Shizuoka, Japan
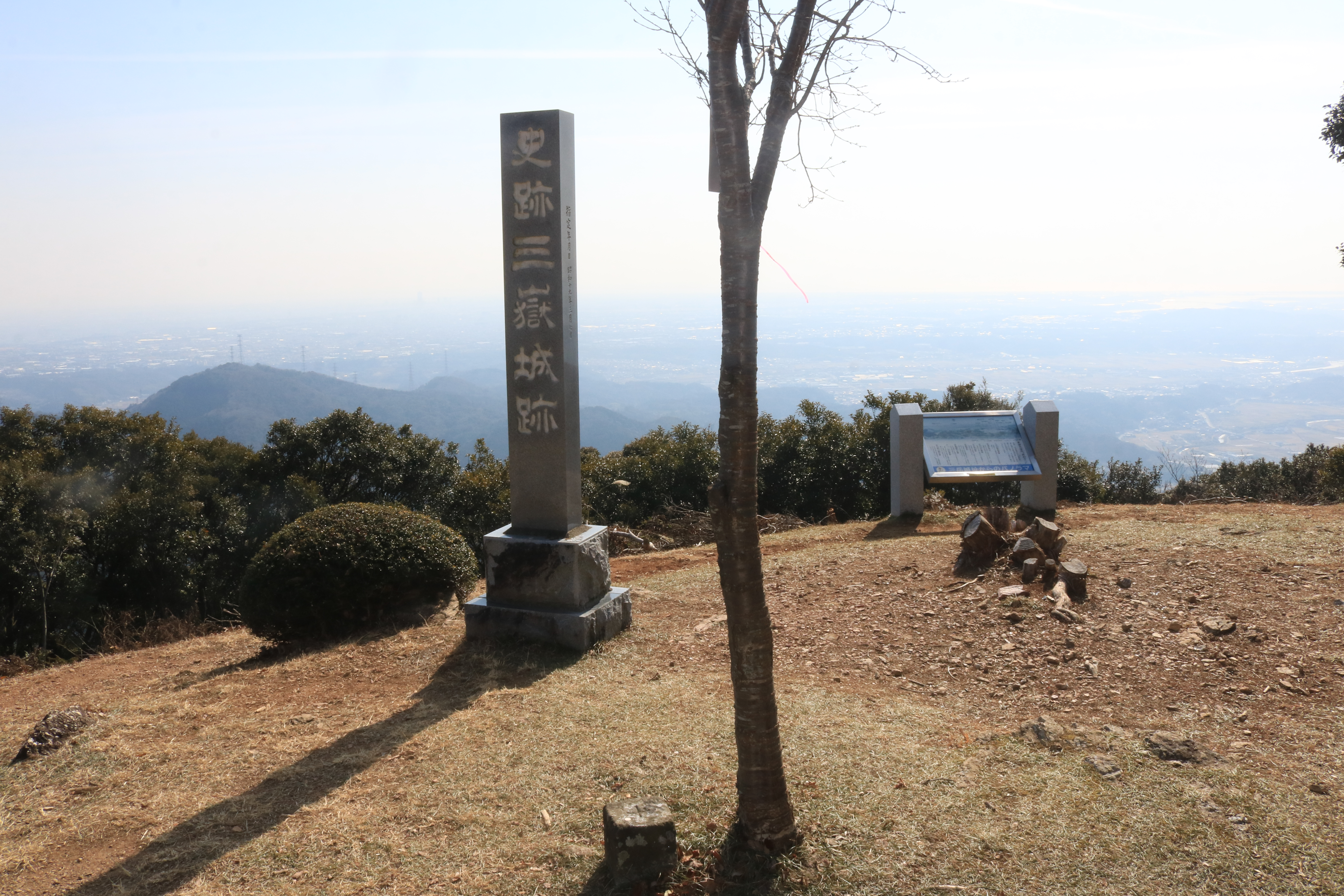
- Site of Mitake Castle

Site information
- Type: yamashiro-style Japanese castle
- Controlled by: Ii clan
- Condition: Ruins

Location
- Coordinates: 34°51′08″N 137°41′32″E

Site history
- Built: Year Unknown
- Built by: c.1338
- In use: c. 1590

Mitake Castle (三岳城跡, Mitake-jō) was a Sengoku period yamashiro-style Japanese castle located in what is now part of the city of Hamamatsu, Shizuoka in the Tōkai region of Japan. It was a fortress of the local Ii clan, which later rose to prominence under the Edo period Tokugawa shogunate. The ruins have been protected as a National Historic Site since 1944.

== Background ==
Mitake Castle is located at the top of a 400-meter hill northeast of the Iinoya valley in former Tōtōmi Province, overlooking Lake Hamana to the south and the modern city of Hamamatsu in the distance. In Iinoya valley was an important communications route between eastern and western Japan, and was thus involved in many conflicts throughout history.

The inner bailey of the castle is a round area approximately 50 meters in diameter, which is divided into several kuruwa enclosures. The western slope is protected by an earthen rampart 150 meters in length, which is reinforced in places by rock. There is a secondary enclosure on the eastern ridge of the mountain, measuring 200 meters, which may have been used as an encampment, although it has no clear defenses, other than a dry moat at one end. A third enclosure is located halfway up the mountain, and has a well. The presence of a Shinto shrine also commemorates that this was the location of the palace of Prince Muneyoshi during his brief stay at the castle during the Nanboku-chō period.

== History ==
It is not certain when Mitake Castle was constructed, but per local legend it began as a fortified Buddhist temple around 1336 AD. The Ii clan lived at Iinoya Castle in the valley, and used Mitake Castle on the mountain as a final redoubt in time of war.

The origins of the Ii clan are also uncertain, but they were already in control of this area since the late Heian period and were in the service of Minamoto no Yoritomo during the Kamakura period. Following the establishment of the Muromachi shogunate, the Ii clan sided with the Southern Court under Emperor Go-Daigo against Ashikaga Takauji. Prince Muneyoshi, the son of Emperor Go-Daigo, initially rallied his forces from Iinoya valley, around which time Mitake Castle was built. However, after he was driven into Shinano Province by the Ashikaga and Mitake Castle was captured in 1339, the Ii clan switched allegiance to the Northern Court and the Ashikaga shogunate. Later, the castle was used by Shiba Yoshitatsu to defeat Asahina Yasutomo, a vassal of the Imagawa clan in 1514. This was the last record it was used as a fortress. During the many wars of Imagawa Yoshimoto, the Ii clan fought in the vanguard of the Imagawa army and suffered many casualties, including its clan leadership. Mitake Castle itself was seized from the Ii clan after the start of the rebellion of Tokugawa Ieyasu for independence from the Imagawa, and the Imagawa rebuilt its fortifications. However, under Ii Naotora and Ii Naomasa, the clan defected to the Tokugawa side and was able to recover Mitake Castle by 1573.

In 1590, when Toyotomi Hideyoshi transferred Tokugawa Ieyasu to the Kantō region, the Ii clan accompanied him to his new domains, and Mitake Castle was abandoned around this time. Today, no structures remain of the castle, but the outlines of then enclosures can still be discerned on the mountain.

== See also ==
- List of Historic Sites of Japan (Shizuoka)
