= Jean Toulout =

French actor (1887–1962)

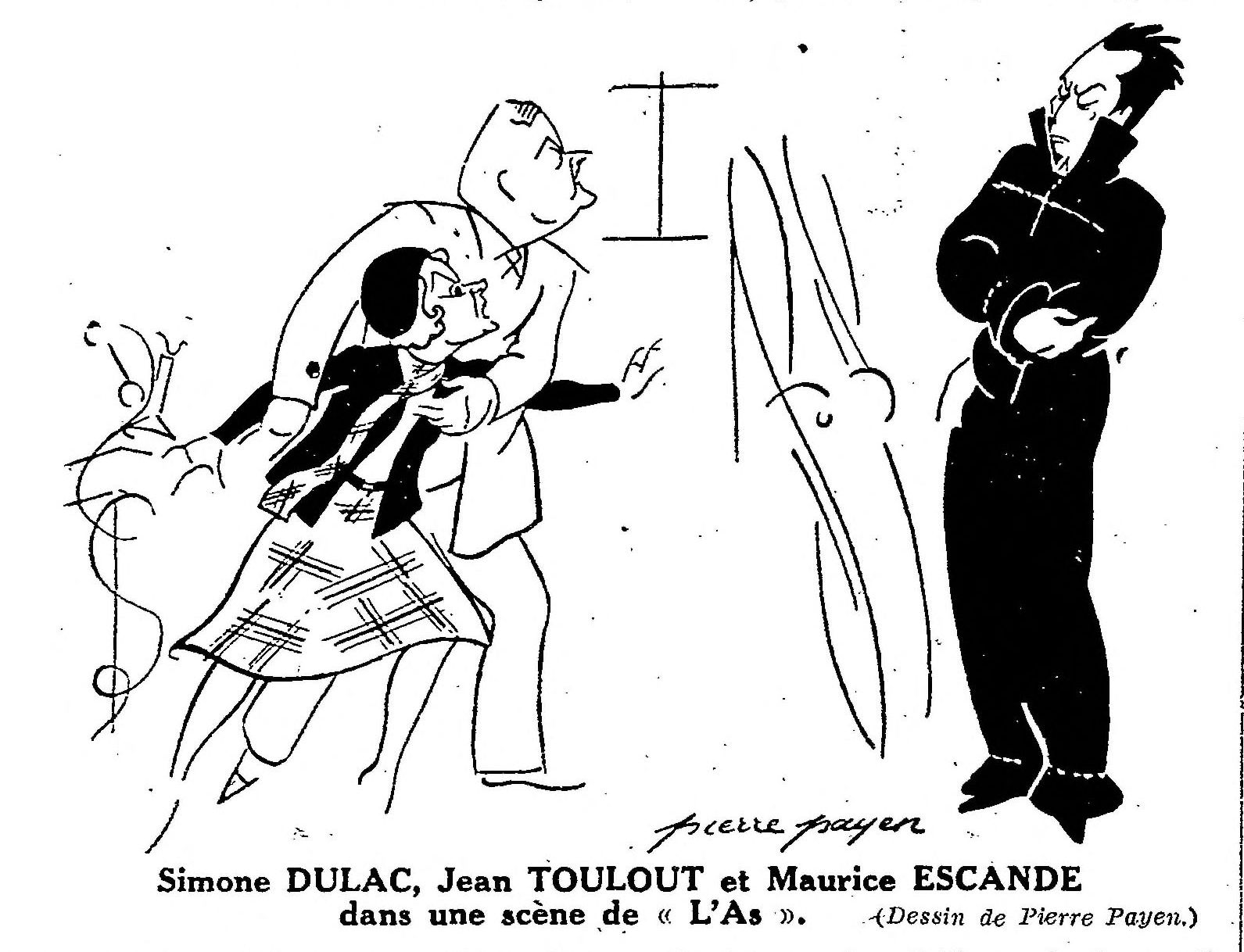
- Simone Dulac, Jean Toulout et Maurice Escande dans une scène de "L'As", dessin paru dans Ric et Rac
- Born: 28 September 1887; Paris, France
- Died: 23 October 1962 (aged 75); Paris, France
- Occupation: Actor
- Years active: 1911–1959
- Spouse: Yvette Andréyor (m. 1917; div. 1926)

Jean Toulout (28 September 1887 – 23 October 1962) was a French film actor who appeared in more than 100 films between 1911 and 1959.

== Selected filmography ==
- La Digue (1911)
- The Mask of Horror (1912)
- The Tenth Symphony (1918)
- La Fête espagnole (1920)
- Jacques Landauze (1920)
- Mathias Sandorf (1921)
- The Black Diamond (1922)
- King of the Camargue (1922)
- Au Secours! (1924)
- Princess Masha (1927)
- Antoinette Sabrier (1927)
- Beyond the Street (1929)
- Monte Cristo (1929)
- The Three Masks (1929)
- Tenderness (1930)
- Levy and Company (1930)
- Nights of Princes (1930)
- Moritz Makes his Fortune (1931)
- The Malay Dagger (1931)
- Southern Cross (1932)
- The Sandman (1932)
- L'Épervier (1933)
- Fedora (1934)
- The Queen of Biarritz (1934)
- Moscow Nights (1934)
- Stradivarius (1935)
- Vertigo (1935)
- Mercadet (1936)
- Nights of Fire (1937)
- Miarka (1937)
- Monsieur Bégonia (1937)
- The Red Dancer (1937)
- Prince of My Heart (1938)
- Heroes of the Marne (1938)
- Case of Conscience (1939)
- The Crossroads (1942)
- The Snow on the Footsteps (1942)
- Arlette and Love (1943)
- The Exile's Song (1943)
- Don't Shout It from the Rooftops (1943)
- Vertigo (1947)
- The Cupboard Was Bare (1948)
- Doctor Laennec (1949)
- The Nude Woman (1949)
- The Secret of Mayerling (1949)
- Edward and Caroline (1951)
- Never Two Without Three (1951)
- La Fugue de Monsieur Perle (1952)
- Three Days to Live (1957)
