= Pierre Gallon =

French classical musician

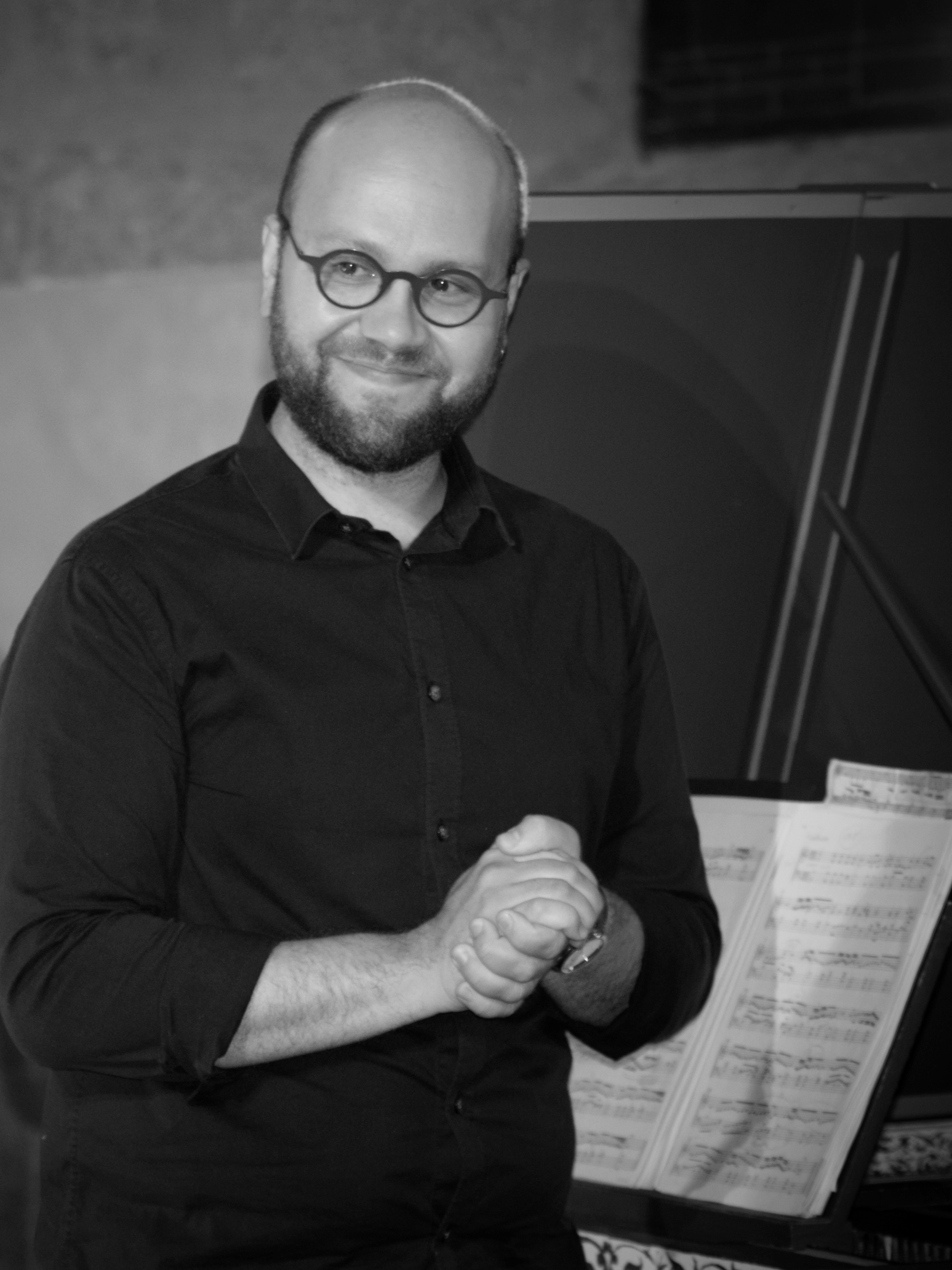
- Pierre Gallon at the Musique à la Source festival 2020
- Born: March 27, 1986; Falaise, Normandy, France
- Occupations: Harpsichordist; organist; fortepianist

Pierre Gallon, born on March 27, 1986 in Falaise (Normandy), is a French harpsichordist, organist, and fortepianist.

== Biography ==
Brother of cellist François Gallon and son of lutenist Pascal Gallon, he grew up immersed in early music, leading him to start playing the harpsichord around the age of 9, at the Caen Conservatory, under Bibiane Lapointe and Thierry Maeder. Simultaneously, he also studied the violin. He was admitted to the Paris Conservatory in 2006 and graduated four years later from the harpsichord and basso continuo classes of Olivier Baumont and Blandine Rannou. According to his biography on his website, he considers his encounters with Blandine Verlet, Élisabeth Joyé, and Pierre Hantaï as key moments in his learning journey.

He has over thirty recordings to his name, notably with the Ensemble Pygmalion, where he is the principal harpsichordist, the Ensemble Correspondences, and Le Poème Harmonique. Until 2022, he recorded solo for the independent label L'Encelade.

His first recording, dedicated to Renaissance publisher Pierre Attaingnant, was highlighted by France Musique through its selection program Choix de France Musique. Since then, Pierre Gallon has been regularly invited as a soloist to La Roque d'Anthéron, the Saintes Festival, La Folle Journée de Nantes, the Festival Oude Muziek Utrecht, etc. His album dedicated to the musical legacy of lutenists in the harpsichord music of the Grand Siècle, titled Blancrocher, l'Offrande (L'Encelade, 2020), was acclaimed by critics; it notably received ffff from Télérama, the Diapason d’Or from the specialized magazine of the same name, and a Choc from the music magazine Classica.

Since 2017, he has also ventured into Classical repertoire as evidenced by his album Haydn, per il Cembalo solo with L'Encelade and, more recently, in duo with soprano Alice Foccroulle, an album of Lieder by Joseph Haydn, where he is found playing the fortepiano (Haydn, Deutsche Lieder, Passacaille, 2021).

He divides his concert activities between recitals, productions directed by Raphaël Pichon, and chamber music; he is regularly found alongside violist Lucile Boulanger, writer Pascal Quignard, soprano Alice Foccroulle, violinist Alice Julien-Laferrière, and harpsichordists Bertrand Cuiller, Yoann Moulin, or Freddy Eichelberger.

In 2024, he joined the record label Harmonia Mundi International.

== Recent discography ==
=== Solo ===
- 2014: Pierre Attaingnant: Auprès de vous. L'Encelade
- 2017: Joseph Haydn: Per il Cembalo solo. L'Encelade

(2019: partial reissue of the Per il Cembalo solo album for the Diapason d'or collection, the Essentials)

- 2020: Blancrocher, l'Offrande (music by Louis Couperin, Johann Jakob Froberger, Denis Gaultier, François Dufaut). L'Encelade
- 2021: Joseph Haydn: Deutsche Lieder. Passacaille
- 2022: Johann Sebastian Bach: French Suites. L'Encelade
- 2024: François Couperin: Royal Concerts ()transcriptions for two harpsichords with Matthieu Boutineau). Harmonia Mundi International

=== Chamber music, orchestra ===
- 2019: Dumesny, haute-contre de Lully / A Nocte Temporis - R. van Mechelen. Alpha Classics
- 2020: Cavalieri Imperiali / Inalto - Lambert Colson. Ricercar
- 2020: Johann Sebastian Bach: Motets / Pygmalion. Harmonia Mundi
- 2020: Il Genio Ingleses, works by Matteis / Ground Floor. Harmonia Mundi
- 2021: Bach-Handel / Sabine Devieilhe, Pygmalion - R. Pichon. Erato
- 2021: Amazone / Lea Desandre, Jupiter. Erato
- 2022: Johann Sebastian Bach: St Matthew Passion / Pygmalion - R. Pichon. Harmonia Mundi
- 2023: Indiscretion / The Curious Bards. Harmonia Mundi
- 2023: Claudio Monteverdi: Vespers / Pygmalion - R. Pichon. Harmonia Mundi

=== Operas (DVD) ===
- 2016: Luigi Rossi, Orfeo / Directed by J. Mijnssen, Pygmalion. Harmonia Mundi
- 2016: John Blow, Venus & Adonis / Directed by L. Moaty, Les Musiciens du Paradis. Alpha
- 2021: Jean-Philippe Rameau, Hippolyte & Aricie / Directed by J. Candel, Pygmalion. Naxos
- 2021: Francesco Cavalli, Ercole amante / Directed by V. Lessort & Christian Hecq, Pygmalion. Naxos
