= Queen of the Night (1931 Italian-language film) =

1931 film directed by Marcel L'Herbier

- Directed by: Marcel L'Herbier; Amleto Palermi; Guido Brignone
- Written by: Marcel L'Herbier; Alfred Machard
- Produced by: Pierre Braunberger; Roger Richebé
- Starring: Francesca Bertini; Ruggero Ruggeri; Romano Calò
- Cinematography: Mario Nalpas; Fernando Risi
- Music by: Michel Michelet
- Production companies: Les Établissements Braunberger-Richebé; Alfa Cinematografica
- Release date: December 1931
- Running time: 92 minutes
- Country: France
- Language: Italian

Queen of the Night (Italian: La donna di una notte) is a 1931 French comedy film directed by Marcel L'Herbier, assisted by Amleto Palermi and Guido Brignone, and starring Francesca Bertini, Ruggero Ruggeri and Romano Calò. It was filmed in Germany as the Italian-language version of the French film La Femme d'une nuit, also directed by L'Herbier. In the early years of sound, it was common to remake films in different languages. A German-language version was released the same year, directed by Fritz Wendhausen.

The sets for the film were designed by the art directors Boris Bilinsky and Paolo Reni.

This was Bertini's first sound movie.

== Cast ==
- Francesca Bertini as La principessa Elena di Lystria
- Ruggero Ruggeri as Jean Derville
- Romano Calò as Il presidente del Consiglio
- Giorgio Bianchi as Il tenente della guardia
- Olga Berndt as Nanette
- Oreste Bilancia as Rosiek
- Raimondo Van Riel as Lo sconosciuto
- Angelo Ferrari as L'ufficiale di polizia
- Boris de Fast as Il portiere del principato di Lystria

== Bibliography ==
- Stefano Masi & Enrico Lancia. Les séductrices du cinéma italien. Gremese Editore, 1 January 1997.
