= Salto Mortale =

Salto Mortale may refer to:

- Salto Mortale (1931 French film), a French film
- Salto Mortale (1931 German film), a German film
- Salto Mortale (1953 film), a West German film
- Salto Mortale (TV series), a West German television series
