= La Vie parisienne =

La Vie parisienne or Parisian Life may refer to:

- La Vie parisienne (operetta), by Jacques Offenbach
- La Vie Parisienne (magazine), French weekly magazine founded in Paris in 1863
- The Parisian Life (painting), 1892 oil on canvas painting by Juan Luna

== Films ==
- La Vie parisienne (1936 film), directed by Robert Siodmak
- Parisian Life (1936 film), English remake of the same film
- Parisian Life (1977 film), directed by Christian-Jaque
