= Jean Auscher =

French artist, caricaturist, and illustrator

Jean Auscher was a 20th-century French artist, caricaturist, and illustrator. He was born in Nancy, France on 18 August 1896 and died 21 December 1985 in Paris.

Auscher was a pupil at l’Ecole des Arts Decoratifs in Paris. His work was exhibited at Le Salon d'Automne and Le Salon des Tuileries between 1923 and 1933.

His most characteristic work recorded the life "des Annees Folles" in the Paris of the 1920s, including scenes in the casinos, gambling clubs and dance halls, evoking the decadence of the demimonde. He also recorded the theatrical community with portraits of actors, some in their famous roles, such as Louis Jouvet as "Le Trouhadec indigne" and the clown Grock.

His best-known work appeared in limited edition folios published by the artist himself (La Faune des Dancings, 1925 and Le Baccara, C 1926). Many copies of the lithographs contained in these were heightened with watercolor. He contributed to the satirical journal Le Rire ("Laughter"); he also illustrated works by Irène Némirovsky, who was rediscovered when Suite Francaise was republished in 2004. Andre Haguenauer (Les Amertumes (Bitterness), 1925) and Alfred Machard (Printemps Sexuel) provided Auscher with subject matter that was again towards the margins of conventional attitudes to sexuality.

Auscher later illustrated the court proceedings taken against the collaborationist French government after World War II, including those against Marshal Philippe Pétain, Charles Maurras, and Pierre Laval.
