= The Flower of the Caucasus =

1920 film

- Directed by: Augusto Camerini
- Starring: Carmen Boni
- Cinematography: Cesare Cavagna
- Production company: Nova Film
- Distributed by: Nova Film
- Release date: October 1920
- Country: Italy
- Languages: Silent; Italian intertitles

The Flower of the Caucasus (Italian: Il fiore del Caucaso) is a 1920 Italian silent film directed by Augusto Camerini.

== Cast ==
- Carmen Boni
- Romano Calò
- Margherita Losanges

== Bibliography ==
- Stewart, John. Italian film: a who's who. McFarland, 1994.
