= Love and Luck (film) =

1932 French comedy film

- Directed by: Monty Banks
- Written by: Seymour Hicks; Victor Kendall; Pierre Maudru; Walter C. Mycroft
- Produced by: Jacques Haïk
- Starring: Max Dearly; Ginette Gaubert; Olga Valéry
- Cinematography: Paul Cotteret; Julien Ringel
- Edited by: Maurice Serein
- Production company: Les Établissements Jacques Haïk
- Distributed by: Les Établissements Jacques Haïk
- Release date: 23 December 1932
- Running time: 95 minutes
- Country: France
- Language: French

Love and Luck (French: L'amour et la veine) is a 1932 French comedy film directed by Monty Banks and starring Max Dearly, Ginette Gaubert and Olga Valéry. It is the French-language version of the British film Money for Nothing also directed by Banks but with a different cast. Such multiple-language versions were common in the early years of sound before dubbing came to be used more widely. The film's sets were designed by the art director Jean D'Eaubonne. It was one of the first films to premiere at the Grand Rex cinema in Paris which had been constructed by Jacques Haïk who also produced the film, and was a popular success.

== Synopsis ==
Confusion arises about a gambler who has the same name as a millionaire.

== Cast ==
- Max Dearly as Jeff Chester
- Ginette Gaubert as Jeanne Bermont
- Olga Valéry as Comtesse Sohoza
- Rachel Devirys as Nina Delaporte
- Carina as Femme de chambre
- Nita Alvarez as Audray
- Robert Ancelin as Jackson
- Henri Richard as Jack Chester
- Paul Marthès as Maítre d'hôtel
- Robert Seller as Durant
- Gabriel Jacques as Tromboli
- Simone Lencret as Claudine
- Carjol as Bermont

== Bibliography ==
- Crisp, Colin. Genre, Myth and Convention in the French Cinema, 1929-1939. Indiana University Press, 2002. ISBN 978-0-253-21516-1.
- Smoodin, Eric. Paris in the Dark: Going to the Movies in the City of Light, 1930–1950. Duke University Press, 2020.
