= Klokslag Twaalf =

1936 film

- Directed by: Léo Joannon
- Written by: Louis De Bree (dialogue); Alfred Machard (novel)
- Release date: November 5, 1936
- Running time: 89 minutes
- Country: Netherlands
- Language: Dutch

Klokslag Twaalf is a 1936 Dutch crime film drama directed by Léo Joannon. A separate French-language version When Midnight Strikes was also produced.

== Cast ==
- Louis De Bree as Jean Verdier
- Fien de la Mar as Matia
- Coen Hissink
- Jules Verstraete
- Piet Te Nuyl
