= They Were Five (1952 film) =

1952 film

- Directed by: Jack Pinoteau
- Written by: Michel Jourdan; Pierre Laroche
- Produced by: Robert Jallès
- Starring: Marcel André; Jean Carmet; Jean Gaven
- Cinematography: Jacques Lemare
- Edited by: Marguerite Beaugé
- Music by: Georges Van Parys
- Production companies: Sud Film; Jeannic Films
- Distributed by: Société Marseillaise de Films
- Release date: 23 January 1952
- Running time: 89 minutes
- Country: France
- Language: French

They Were Five (French: Ils étaient cinq) is a 1952 French drama film directed by Jack Pinoteau and starring Marcel André, Jean Carmet and Jean Gaven. It was shot at the Boulogne Studios in Paris. The film's sets were designed by the art director Jacques Colombier.

== Synopsis ==
Following the Second World War, five inseparable comrades return home and swear eternal friendship. However this proves to be harder than they expect in peacetime. It ends tragically for several of the characters, one of whom is killed in the War in Indochina.

== Cast ==
- Marcel André as the commissioner
- Jean Carmet as Jean, the postal worker
- Jean Gaven as Marcel, the boxer
- Michel Jourdan as Roger Courtois, the actor
- François Martin as André Lamberay, the student
- Jean-Claude Pascal as Philippe, heir of a rich family
- Jean Marchat as Frédo, the director of the cabaret "La joie de vivre"
- Arlette Merry as Valérie, Roger's sister
- André Versini as Serge, Valérie's agent
- Nicole Besnard as Simone, Jean's friend
- Robert Dalban as Dufau, the manager
- Irène Hilda as Fabienne Dorée
- Louis de Funès as Albert, the manager

== Bibliography ==
- Marie, Michel. The French New Wave: An Artistic School. John Wiley & Sons, 2008.
