= La Vie parisienne (1936 film) =

Parisian Life
- Theatrical poster
- Directed by: Robert Siodmak
- Written by: Henri Meilhac (libretto); Ludovic Halevy (libretto); Michel Carré; Benno Vigny; Emeric Pressburger; Marcel Carné
- Produced by: Seymour Nebenzal
- Starring: Max Dearly; Conchita Montenegro; George Rigaud
- Cinematography: Michel Kelber; Armand Thirard
- Edited by: Ernest Hajos
- Production company: Nero Film
- Distributed by: Gaumont
- Release date: 22 January 1936
- Running time: 95 minutes
- Country: France
- Language: French

Parisian Life (French:La Vie parisienne) is a 1936 French musical film directed by Robert Siodmak and starring Max Dearly, Conchita Montenegro and George Rigaud.

The film was made by Nero Film, run by the émigré producer Seymour Nebenzal. It is based on the opera La Vie parisienne. The film's sets were designed by Jacques Colombier. A separate English-language version, called Parisian Life, was also produced. The production was not a success, causing financial problems for the company.

== Cast ==
- Max Dearly as Ramiro Mendoza
- Conchita Montenegro as Helenita
- George Rigaud as Jacques Mendoza
- Christian-Gérard as Georges
- Germaine Aussey as Simone
- Marcelle Praince as Liane d'Ysigny
- Bergeol
- Valentine Camax
- Roger Dann
- Maurice Devienne
- Gaston Dupray
- Enrico Glori
- Jacques Henley
- Richard Lamy
- Georges Morton
- Jean Périer
- Claude Roussell
- Germaine Sablon
- Sinoël
- Michèle Morgan as Extra
- Austin Trevor as Don Joâo

== Bibliography ==
- Bock, Hans-Michael & Bergfelder, Tim. The Concise CineGraph. Encyclopedia of German Cinema. Berghahn Books, 2009.
