= Tossing Ship =

1932 film

- Directed by: Jean de La Cour
- Written by: Maurice Larrouy (novel); Albert Willemetz (operetta); Jean de La Cour
- Produced by: Jacques Haïk
- Starring: Max Dearly; Edith Manet; Pierre Magnier
- Cinematography: Paul Cotteret; Robert Lefebvre
- Music by: André Messager
- Production company: Films Jean de la Cour
- Distributed by: Les Établissements Jacques Haïk
- Release date: 20 May 1932
- Running time: 115 minutes
- Country: France
- Language: French

Tossing Ship (French: Coups de roulis) is a 1932 French musical comedy film directed by Jean de La Cour and starring Max Dearly, Edith Manet and Pierre Magnier. It is an operetta film based on the stage work Coups de roulis by André Messager.

== Cast ==
- Max Dearly as Le député Puy-Pradal
- Edith Manet as Béatrice
- Pierre Magnier as Le commandant Gerville
- Lucienne Herval as Sola Myrrhis
- Roger Bourdin as Kermao
- Robert Darthez as Bettory
- Germaine Roger as Betty
- Hubert Daix as Le docteur
- Henri Lévêque as Haubourdin
- Pierre Clarel as Pinson
- Robert Brummel as Un officier
- Jacques Erwin as Un officier
- Bernard Koowost as Philippe Hersent
- Christian Casadesus as Un officier
- Georges Deneubourg
- Gérard Landry

== Bibliography ==
- Crisp, Colin. Genre, Myth and Convention in the French Cinema, 1929-1939. Indiana University Press, 2002.
