= Robert Lefebvre =

French cinematographer

Robert Lefebvre (1907–1989) was a French cinematographer.

== Selected filmography ==
- The Polish Jew (1931)
- Make a Living (1931)
- Azaïs (1931)
- His Best Client (1932)
- Tossing Ship (1932)
- Nicole and Her Virtue (1932)
- Le Roi des Champs-Élysées (1934)
- Sapho (1934)
- Tartarin of Tarascon (1934)
- Paris-Deauville (1934)
- Mademoiselle Mozart (1935)
- Excursion Train (1936)
- The New Men (1936)
- Charley's Aunt (1936)
- Beethoven's Great Love (1937)
- Southern Mail (1937)
- The Kiss of Fire (1937)
- Ignace (1937)
- Marthe Richard (1937)
- Ultimatum (1938)
- The Postmaster's Daughter (1938)
- Ernest the Rebel (1938)
- The Mayor's Dilemma (1939)
- The World Will Tremble (1939)
- Beating Heart (1940)
- Premier rendez-vous (1941)
- The Last of the Six (1941)
- Twisted Mistress (1942)
- Annette and the Blonde Woman (1942)
- Colonel Chabert (1943)
- Voyage Without Hope (1943)
- Goodbye Darling (1946)
- The White Night (1948)
- Clochemerle (1948)
- To the Eyes of Memory (1948)
- The Dance of Death (1948)
- The Secret of Mayerling (1949)
- The King (1949)
- God Needs Men (1950)
- The Patron (1950)
- The Unexpected Voyager (1950)
- Ballerina (1950)
- Lady Paname (1950)
- Savage Triangle (1951)
- Edward and Caroline (1951)
- The Cape of Hope (1951)
- Pleasures of Paris (1952)
- Casque d'Or (1952)
- The Call of Destiny (1953)
- One Step to Eternity (1954)
- Ali Baba and the Forty Thieves (1954)
- Bad Liaisons (1955)
- Fruits of Summer (1955)
- Nathalie (1957)
- And Your Sister? (1958)
- Life Together (1958)
- Seventh Heaven (1958)
- Back to the Wall (1958)
- Nathalie, Secret Agent (1959)
- Ravishing (1960)
- Girl on the Road (1962)
- How to Succeed in Love (1962)
- Relax Darling (1964)
- That Tender Age (1964)
