= Make a Living =

1931 film

- Directed by: André Berthomieu
- Written by: Pierre Maudru; René Pujol; Albert Willemetz
- Produced by: Jacques Haïk
- Starring: Victor Boucher; Dolly Davis; André Dubosc
- Cinematography: Jules Kruger; Robert Lefebvre
- Music by: Henri Verdun
- Production company: Les Établissements Jacques Haïk
- Release date: 9 October 1931
- Running time: 95 minutes
- Country: France
- Language: French

Make a Living (French: Gagne ta vie) is a 1931 French comedy film directed by André Berthomieu and starring Victor Boucher, Dolly Davis and André Dubosc. The film's sets were designed by the art director Jean d'Eaubonne.

== Synopsis ==
A party-loving wastrel is cut off financially by his father, and suddenly has to earn his own living. He falls in love with a beautiful woman, and by a stroke of luck becomes wealthy.

== Cast ==
- Victor Boucher as Jacques Laumière
- Dolly Davis as Paulette Martin
- André Dubosc as Monsieur Laumière
- Florelle as Dans son propre rôle / Self
- Robert Goupil as Philippe
- Louis Florencie as Monsieur Martin
- Fred Marche as Aldebert Gajac
- Paulette Duvernet
- Jean Sinoël
- Nathalie de Sol
- Pierre Labry
- René Bergeron
- Raymond Blot
- Albert Broquin
- Georges Deneubourg
- Gabrielle Fontan
- Jean Heuzé
- Jane Loury
- Stéphane Pizella
- Robert Tourneur
- Jean Valmont

== Bibliography ==
- Crisp, Colin. Genre, Myth and Convention in the French Cinema, 1929-1939. Indiana University Press, 2002.
- Rège, Philippe. Encyclopedia of French Film Directors, Volume 1. Scarecrow Press, 2009.
