= De Man Zonder Hart =

1937 film

- Directed by: Léo Joannon
- Written by: Louis de Bree (dialogue), Alfred Machard (novel)
- Release date: 23 April 1937
- Running time: 80 minutes
- Country: Netherlands
- Language: Dutch

De Man Zonder Hart is a 1937 Dutch drama film directed by Léo Joannon.

== Cast ==
- Louis de Bree as Jean Sourdier
- Dolly Mollinger as Sylvette. his former secretary
- Elias van Praag as The man of the barrel organ
- John Gobau] as Jeanton, the murdered companion of Soudier
- Ank van der Moer as Heilsoldate
- Greta Eichenveld]] as The daughter
