= Troubled Heart (film) =

1938 film

- Directed by: Jean Vallée
- Written by: Jacques Chabannes
- Based on: Troubled Heart by Lucien Descaves
- Produced by: Claude Dolbert
- Starring: Max Dearly; Huguette Duflos; Henri Rollan
- Cinematography: Raymond Agnel
- Edited by: Lucienne Descamps; Madeleine Gug
- Music by: Jane Bos
- Production company: Les Productions Claude Dolbert
- Release date: 1 June 1938
- Running time: 88 minutes
- Country: France
- Language: French

Troubled Heart (French: Le coeur ébloui) is a 1938 French drama film directed by Jean Vallée and starring Max Dearly, Huguette Duflos and Henri Rollan. It was based on the 1926 play of the same title by Lucien Descaves. The film's sets were designed by the art director Jean Douarinou.

== Cast ==
- Max Dearly as Géodésias
- Huguette Duflos as Madeleine
- Henri Rollan as Le docteur Valory
- José Noguéro as René Arnal
- Catherine Fonteney as Mademoiselle Cléringer
- Mady Berry as Aurélie
- Fernand Charpin as Monsieur Arnal
- Pauline Carton as Madame Morin
- Roger Legris as Abel Morin

== Bibliography ==
- Bessy, Maurice & Chirat, Raymond. Histoire du cinéma français: 1935-1939. Pygmalion, 1986.
- Crisp, Colin. Genre, Myth and Convention in the French Cinema, 1929-1939. Indiana University Press, 2002.
- Rège, Philippe. Encyclopedia of French Film Directors, Volume 1. Scarecrow Press, 2009.
