= La Femme d'une nuit =

1930 film directed by Marcel L'Herbier

- Directed by: Marcel L'Herbier
- Written by: Marcel L'Herbier
- Based on: La Femme d'une nuit by Alfred Machard
- Produced by: Pierre Braunberger; Mario Nalpas
- Starring: Francesca Bertini; Jean Murat; Antonin Artaud
- Cinematography: Léonce-Henri Burel; Nikolai Toporkoff
- Music by: Michel Michelet
- Production companies: Les Établissements Braunberger-Richebé; Länderfilm
- Release date: 1931
- Running time: 88 minutes
- Country: France
- Language: French

La Femme d'une nuit ("The woman of one night") is a 1931 French drama film directed by Marcel L'Herbier. It was made simultaneously with Italian and German versions of the same story, which were however not only in different languages but in different genres.

== Cast ==
- Francesca Bertini as La princesse de Lystrie
- Jean Murat as Jean d'Armont
- Boris de Fast as Portier lystrien
- Andrews Engelmann as Portier lystrien
- Georges Tréville
- Antonin Artaud as Jaroslav

== Production ==
In 1930 Marcel L'Herbier was asked by the producer Mario Nalpas to go to Berlin to make a film based on a novel by Alfred Machard. In common with many other early sound films, the proposal was that three versions would be made simultaneously in different languages - French, Italian, and German - but what was unusual in the production was that each version was to be in a different genre. The German version (Königin einer Nacht) was an operetta, the Italian version (La donna di una notte) was a comedy, while the French version (La Femme d'une nuit) was a dramatic film. This made the process of script preparation particularly difficult. The film's sets were designed by the art directors Boris Bilinsky and Pierre Schild. Filming was completed during about seven weeks during the summer of 1930. Before the French version could be released, the producer Nalpas was forced to sell his rights in the production, and in the resulting financial confusion the film received very little commercial release. L'Herbier also asked for his name to be removed from it when it was re-edited without his agreement.
