= Michel Jourdan =

- Born: Michel Yves René Leray; 2 June 1926; Nantes, France
- Died: 4 August 1985 (aged 59); Paris, France
- Occupation: Actor
- Years active: 1948–1973

Michel Yves René Leray (2 June 1926 – 4 August 1985), better known by the stage name of Michel Jourdan, was French film actor.

Jourdan died in Paris on 4 August 1985, at the age of 59.

== Selected filmography ==
- The Passenger (1949)
- Mammy (1951)
- They Were Five (1952)
- At the Edge of the City (1953)
- Touchez pas au grisbi (1954)
- Burning Fuse (1957)
- The Cat (1958)
- The Cat Shows Her Claws (1960)

== Bibliography ==
- Goble, Alan. The Complete Index to Literary Sources in Film. Walter de Gruyter, 1999.
