= Azaïs (film) =

1931 film

- Directed by: René Hervil
- Written by: Pierre Maudru
- Based on: Azaïs by Georges Berr and Louis Verneuil
- Produced by: Jacques Haïk
- Starring: Max Dearly; Simone Rouvière; Jeanne Saint-Bonnet
- Cinematography: Robert Lefebvre; Armand Thirard
- Music by: Victor Alix; Henri Verdun
- Production company: Les Établissements Jacques Haïk
- Distributed by: Les Établissements Jacques Haïk
- Release date: 22 May 1931
- Running time: 102 minutes
- Country: France
- Language: French

Azaïs is a 1931 French comedy film directed by René Hervil and starring Max Dearly, Simone Rouvière and Jeanne Saint-Bonnet. It is based on a play of the same title by Georges Berr and Louis Verneuil. The film's sets were designed by the art director Jean d'Eaubonne.

== Synopsis ==
An unsuccessful piano teacher has suffered what he believes to be thirty five year of bad luck. He becomes convinced by the philosopher Azaïs that this will inevitably be followed by thirty five years of good luck. His professional and romantic fortunes rapidly take an upward turn.

== Cast ==
- Max Dearly as Baron Wurtz
- Simone Rouvière as Suzette Wurtz
- Jeanne Saint-Bonnet as Comtesse Romani
- Pierre Stéphen as Félix Borneret
- Gaston Dupray as Luquin
- Henriette Delannoy as Baronne Wurtz
- Vahlia Graham asLady Hamilton
- Suzy Pierson as Gabrielle Avize
- Paulette Duvernet as La caissière
- Leda Ginelly as La danseuse
- Henry Houry as Fogson
- Robert Pizani as Stromboli
- Paul Clerget as Constantinovitch
- Berni as Le roi de Moldavie

== Bibliography ==
- Bessy, Maurice & Chirat, Raymond. Histoire du cinéma français: 1929-1934. Pygmalion, 1988.
- Crisp, Colin. Genre, Myth and Convention in the French Cinema, 1929-1939. Indiana University Press, 2002.
- Goble, Alan. The Complete Index to Literary Sources in Film. Walter de Gruyter, 1999.
- Rège, Philippe. Encyclopedia of French Film Directors, Volume 1. Scarecrow Press, 2009.
