= Constant Rémy =

French actor

Constant Remy
- Born: 20 May 1882; Paris, France
- Died: 16 August 1958 (aged 76); Cannes, France
- Occupation: Actor
- Years active: 1908 - 1955 (film)

Constant Rémy (20 May 1882 – 16 August 1958) was a French film actor. He appeared in more than sixty films during his career.

== Selected filmography ==
- Atlantis (1930)
- A Star Disappears (1932)
- The Nude Woman (1932)
- Roger la Honte (1933)
- The Agony of the Eagles (1933)
- The Red Robe (1933)
- Street Without a Name (1934)
- His Other Love (1934)
- Little Jacques (1934)
- The Mysteries of Paris (1935)
- Helene (1936)
- The Men Without Names (1937)
- The Path of Honour (1939)
- Hopes (1941)
- Royal Affairs in Versailles (1954)

== Bibliography ==
- Mosley, Philip. Split Screen: Belgian Cinema and Cultural Identity. SUNY Press, 2001.
