= Claudine at School (film) =

1937 film

- Directed by: Serge de Poligny
- Written by: Colette (novel); Jacques Constant
- Produced by: Paul Boisserand; Jacques Haïk
- Starring: Max Dearly; Pierre Brasseur; Suzet Maïs
- Cinematography: Willy Faktorovitch; Jean-Paul Goreaud
- Edited by: Maurice Serein
- Music by: Paul Misraki
- Production company: Les Films Regent
- Distributed by: Les Films Cristal
- Release date: 15 December 1937
- Running time: 109 minutes
- Country: France
- Language: French

Claudine at School (French: Claudine à l'école) is a 1937 French comedy film directed by Serge de Poligny and starring Max Dearly, Pierre Brasseur and Suzet Maïs. It is an adaptation of the 1900 novel of the same title by Colette.

The film's sets were designed by the art director Jacques Krauss.

== Cast ==
- Max Dearly as Le père de Claudine
- Pierre Brasseur as Le docteur Dubois
- Suzet Maïs as Aimée Lanthenay
- Blanchette Brunoy as Claudine
- Marcel Mouloudji as Mouloud
- Zélie Yzelle as Mélie
- Katia Lova as La grande Anaïs
- Jacqueline Dumonceau as Une des soeurs Jaubert
- Yvonne Broussard as Une des soeurs Jaubert
- Élyane Soler as Marie Belhomme
- Solange Turenne as Luce
- Jacqueline Valerio as La petite Soulié
- Ketty Pierson as Junon
- Christiane Rénal as La paysanne
- Georges Colin as Dutertre
- Léon Larive as Rabastens
- Marcel Charvey as Duplessis
- Auguste Bovério as Le docteur Lebarbu
- René Bussy as Le parlementaire
- Louis Gouget as Un examinateur
- Fred Marche as L'huissier
- Moret as Le maître-nageur
- Raymond Rognoni as Un examinateur
- Jeanne Fusier-Gir as Mademoiselle Griset
- Margo Lion as Mademoiselle Sergent

== Bibliography ==
- Dayna Oscherwitz & MaryEllen Higgins. The A to Z of French Cinema. Scarecrow Press, 2009.
- Goble, Alan. The Complete Index to Literary Sources in Film. Walter de Gruyter, 1999.
