= Jacques Haïk =

French film producer

- Born: 20 June 1893; Tunis, French Protectorate of Tunisia
- Died: 31 August 1950 (aged 57); Paris, France
- Occupation: Producer
- Years active: 1924-1948 (film)

Jacques Haïk (20 June 1893 – 31 August 1950) was a French film producer. Born of Jewish descent in French-controlled Tunisia, he moved to Paris where he found work in the film industry, introducing Charlie Chaplin to French audiences. He gradually built up a chain of cinemas including the Grand Rex (1931), and established his own production company Les Établissements Jacques Haïk which was very active during the early 1930s. Following the introduction of sound film he made several French-language films at the Twickenham Studios in the United Kingdom until his Paris studios were equipped for sound production.

Haïk was Jewish. Following the outbreak of the Second World War he produced the anti-Nazi My Crimes After Mein Kampf and supported the Free French. In 1940, the Nazis took control of his company Les Films Régent during the Nazi plunder, and he returned to Tunisia to hide. He returned to Paris in 1945 but all of his movie theaters were confiscated under the pretext of Aryanization. Haïk spent the last five years of his life trying to reclaim his real estate and died in 1950.

== Selected filmography ==
- André Cornélis (1918)
- Le Bossu (1925)
- André Cornélis (1927)
- The Beauty Shoppers (1927)
- La Maisonde la Flêche (1930)
- The Mystery of the Villa Rose (1930)
- Atlantis (1930)
- The Sweetness of Loving (1930)
- Our Masters, the Servants (1930)
- A Caprice of Pompadour (1931)
- Azaïs (1931)
- Coquecigrole (1931)
- Make a Living (1931)
- The False Millionaire (1931)
- Love and Luck (1932)
- Our Lord's Vineyard (1932)
- Night Shift (1932)
- The Lacquered Box (1932)
- Nicole and Her Virtue (1932)
- Tossing Ship (1932)
- Mannequins (1933)
- Claudine at School (1937)
- Case of Conscience (1939)
- My Crimes After Mein Kampf (1940)
- The Woman I Murdered (1948)

== Bibliography ==
- Crisp, C.G. The Classic French Cinema, 1930-1960. Indiana University Press, 1993.
