= Fun in the Barracks =

1932 film directed by Maurice Tourneur

- Directed by: Maurice Tourneur
- Written by: Georges Courteline (play); Edouard Nores (play); Georges Dolley
- Starring: Raimu; Jean Gabin; Fernandel; René Donnio
- Cinematography: Raymond Agnel; René Colas
- Edited by: Jacques Tourneur
- Production company: Pathé-Natan
- Distributed by: Pathé-Natan
- Release date: 18 September 1932
- Running time: 85 minutes
- Country: France
- Language: French

Fun in the Barracks (French: Les Gaîtés de l'escadron or Les Gaietés de l'escadron) is a 1932 French comedy film directed by Maurice Tourneur and starring Raimu, Jean Gabin and Fernandel. It was based on a play by Georges Courteline and Edouard Nores. Tourneur was remaking the story, having previously filmed a silent version in 1913. The film was one of the most expensive made by Tourneur and was a popular commercial hit.

== Synopsis ==
The film is set in 1885. It focuses on a group of troops, a mix of regulars and reservists, and their different responses to the daily military routines. A crisis emerges when a General pays a visit while two deserters are still absent.

== Cast ==
- Raimu as Le capitaine Hurluret
- Jean Gabin as Fricot
- Fernandel as Vanderague
- René Donnio as Laplote
- Charles Camus as Adjudant Flick
- Pierre Labry as Potiron
- Frédéric Munié as Lieutenant Mousseret
- Lucien Nat as Maréchal des Logis chef Barnot
- Pierre Ferval as Brigadier Vergisson
- Georges Bever as La Guillaumette
- Paul Azaïs as Croquebol
- Roland Armontel as Barchetti
- Louis Cari as Fourrier Bernot
- Henry Roussel as Le général
- Ketty Pierson as La charcutière
- Jacqueline Brizard as La blanchisseuse
- Mady Berry as Madame Bijou - la cantinière

== Bibliography ==
- Waldman, Harry. Maurice Tourneur: The Life and Films. McFarland, 2008.
