= Liberty (1938 film) =

1938 film

- Directed by: Jean Kemm
- Written by: Georges André-Cuel; Henry Dupuis-Mazuel
- Based on: Liberté by Léopold Netter
- Produced by: Aimé Frapin
- Starring: Maurice Escande; Lucien Gallas; Milly Mathis
- Cinematography: Louis Chaix
- Music by: Arthur Honegger; Arthur Hoérée
- Production company: Films Artistiques Français
- Distributed by: Films Artistiques Français
- Release date: 13 April 1938
- Running time: 100 minutes
- Country: France
- Language: French

Liberty (French: Liberté) is a 1938 historical biographical drama film directed by Jean Kemm and starring Maurice Escande, Lucien Gallas and Milly Mathis. The film's sets were designed by the art director Claude Bouxin. It is based on the life of Auguste Bartholdi, a sculptor best known for creating the Statue o.

== Cast ==
- Maurice Escande as Auguste Bartholdi
- Marie-Louise Derval as Madame Bartholdi mère
- Jacqueline Brandt as Lisette
- Lucien Gallas as Griboud
- Milly Mathis as Nine
- Rivers Cadet as Jund
- Germaine Rouer as Jeanne
- Marcelle Samson as Madame Navarre

== Bibliography ==
- Bessy, Maurice & Chirat, Raymond. Histoire du cinéma français: encyclopédie des films, Volume 2. Pygmalion, 1986.
- Crisp, Colin. Genre, Myth and Convention in the French Cinema, 1929-1939. Indiana University Press, 2002.
- Rège, Philippe. Encyclopedia of French Film Directors, Volume 1. Scarecrow Press, 2009.
