= René Donnio =

French actor

- Born: René Camille Marie Donnio; 20 August 1889; Loudéac, Côtes d'Armor, France
- Died: 2 January 1934 (aged 44); Nantes, Loire-Atlantique, France
- Occupation: Actor
- Years active: 1919-1933 (film )

René Donnio (29 August 1889 – 2 January 1934) was a French film actor.

== Selected filmography ==
- Tillers of the Soil (1923)
- That Scoundrel Morin (1924)
- The Crew (1928)
- Cagliostro (1929)
- Coquecigrole (1931)
- Fun in the Barracks (1932)
- Monsieur Albert (1932)
- Take Care of Amelie (1932)
- Under the Leather Helmet (1932)
- His Other Love (1934)

== Bibliography ==
- Goble, Alan. The Complete Index to Literary Sources in Film. Walter de Gruyter, 1999.
