= Jean d'Eaubonne =

French art director (1903–1971)

- Born: 8 March 1903; Talence, Gironde, France
- Died: 27 July 1971 (aged 68); Boulogne-Billancourt, Hauts-de-Seine, France
- Occupation: Art director
- Years active: 1929–1973 (film)

Jean d'Eaubonne (March 8, 1903 – July 30, 1971) was a French art director. He received an Oscar nomination in 1951 for his work on Max Ophüls's La Ronde'.

== Selected filmography ==
- Azaïs (1931)
- Coquecigrole (1931)
- Make a Living (1931)
- The Polish Jew (1931)
- Love and Luck (1932)
- Miss Helyett (1933)
- Mannequins (1933)
- Coralie and Company (1934)
- The Queen of Biarritz (1934)
- The Ideal Woman (1934)
- Little Jacques (1934)
- Beautiful Days (1935)
- Bux the Clown (1935)
- The Green Jacket (1937)
- The Girl in the Taxi (1937)
- The Men Without Names (1937)
- A Picnic on the Grass (1937)
- Crossroads (1938)
- Three Waltzes (1938)
- People Who Travel (1938)
- The Train for Venice (1938)
- Star Without Light (1946)
- Devil and the Angel (1946)
- Dilemma of Two Angels (1948)
- I Like Only You (1949)
- Lady Paname (1950)
- Just Me (1950)
- La Ronde (1950)
- Pleasures of Paris (1952)
- This Man Is Dangerous (1953)
- Marianne of My Youth (1955)
- The Affair of the Poisons (1955)
- The Lovers of Lisbon (1955)
- The Bride Is Much Too Beautiful (1956)
- Paris, Palace Hotel (1956)
- A Kiss for a Killer (1957)
- Until the Last One (1957)
- Nina (1959)
- The Nina B. Affair (1961)
- Charade (1963)
- Encounter in Salzburg (1964)
- Champagne for Savages (1964)
- Johnny Banco (1967)
- Leontine (1968)
- A Golden Widow (1969)
- The Road to Salina (1970)
