= Jane Bos =

French composer

- Born: 26 October 1897; Marseille, France
- Died: 16 April 1975 (aged 77)
- Other names: Jeanne Bos, Jane Boss, Paul Chantelauze
- Occupation: Composer
- Years active: 1927–1946 (film)

Jane Bos (born Jane Malka-Meunier) was a French composer of film scores between 1927 and 1946, an era when it was very rare for women to do so.

Born on 26 October 1897 in Marseille, she was a French composer and lyricist known by several pen names she used: Jane Bos (her preferred pseudonym) Jeanne Bos, Jane Boss and Paul Chantelauze.

Apart from her work in film, Jane Bos also authored many pieces for piano, as well as songs, including some for Charles Trénet, during decades from the 1920s to the 1940s.

She died on 16 April 1975 at the age of 77.

== Selected filmography ==
She has been credited with 51 compositions for film and one soundtrack from 1931 to 1946. Selected works include the following.

- The Wonderful Day (1932)
- Theodore and Company (1933)
- Toto (1933)
- 600,000 Francs a Month (1933)
- Mam'zelle Spahi (1934)
- The Dying Land (1936)
- The Mysterious Lady (1936)
- Jacques and Jacotte (1936)
- Temptation (1936)
- The Men Without Names (1937)
- The Club of Aristocrats (1937)
- Madelon's Daughter (1937)
- The West (1938)
- Troubled Heart (1938)
- The Spirit of Sidi-Brahim (1939)
- Miquette (1940)

== Selected songs ==
- Hélène, music by Bos, lyrics by Charles Trenet, sung by Charles Trenet (1932)
- Pourquoi? sung by Charles Trenet, 1935
- La terre qui meurt Music of the film "La terre qui meurt" (1936) by Jean Vallée
- L'escale sung by André Dumas
- Le champion de ces dames, Music of the film of the same title (1935) by René Jayet
- Marie des Angoisses, Music of the film of the same title (1935) by Michel Bernheim
- Viens! sung by Charles Trenet (1932)
- Chantez, mon coeur! sung by Charles Trenet (1932)
- Sais-tu? sung by Charles Trenet (1932)

== Bibliography ==
- Crisp, Colin. French Cinema—A Critical Filmography: Volume 1, 1929-1939. Indiana University Press, 2015.
- Le Conservatoire national de musique et de déclamation 1900-1930 : documents historiques et administratifs / Anne Bongrain, 2012. p. 547
