= Night Shift (1932 film) =

1932 film

- Directed by: Henri Fescourt
- Written by: Pierre Maudru; Louis d'Yvré
- Based on: Tired Theodore by Max Ferner and Max Neal
- Produced by: Jacques Haïk
- Starring: Marcel Barencey; Gaston Dupray; Paulette Dubost
- Cinematography: Julius Jaenzon
- Edited by: Maurice Thaon
- Production companies: Les Films Minerva; Les Établissements Jacques Haïk
- Distributed by: Les Établissements Jacques Haïk
- Release date: 15 April 1932
- Running time: 75 minutes
- Country: France
- Language: French

Night Shift (French: Service de nuit) is a 1932 French comedy film directed by Henri Fescourt and starring Marcel Barencey, Gaston Dupray and Paulette Dubost. It is based on the 1913 German play Tired Theodore by Max Ferner and Max Neal which has been adapted for the screen a number of times. A separate Swedish-language version Tired Theodore, directed by Gustaf Edgren, was also produced in 1931.

== Cast ==
- Marcel Barencey as Théodore Beudraves
- Mylo d'Arcylle as Rose Beudraves
- Paulette Duvernet as Gaby Beauchamp
- Robert Darthez as Darius Beudraves
- Gaston Dupray as Camille Ducreux
- Paulette Dubost as La petite femme
- Anna Lefeuvrier as Sarah
- Fred Marche as Isaac
- Louis Florencie as Le commissaire
- Henri Jullien as Le professeur de chant
- Ketty Pierson as Marie
- André Numès Fils as Laplotte
- Robert Trèves as Le président

== Bibliography ==
- Goble, Alan. The Complete Index to Literary Sources in Film. Walter de Gruyter, 1999.
