= A Caprice of Pompadour =

1931 film

- Directed by: Joë Hamman; Willi Wolff
- Written by: Henri Falk; Hans Rameau; Willi Wolff
- Produced by: Jacques Haïk; Anatol Potock
- Starring: André Baugé; Marcelle Denya; Gaston Dupray
- Cinematography: Willy Hameister
- Music by: Eduard Künneke; Rudolf Nelson; Robert Stolz; Alfred Strasser
- Production companies: Ellen Richter Film; Les Établissements Jacques Haïk
- Distributed by: Les Établissements Jacques Haïk
- Release date: 8 May 1931
- Running time: 93 minutes
- Country: France
- Language: French

A Caprice of Pompadour (French: Un caprice de la Pompadour) is a 1931 French historical musical film directed by Joë Hamman and Willi Wolff and starring André Baugé, Marcelle Denya and Gaston Dupray. A separate German version Madame Pompadour was also made. It marked the film debut of the future star Suzy Delair.

== Cast ==
- André Baugé as Gaston de Méville
- Marcelle Denya as La marquise de Pompadour
- Gaston Dupray as Le marquis de l'Espinglette
- Paulette Duvernet as Madeleine Biron
- René Marjolle as Le roi Louis XV
- André Marnay as Maurepas
- Madyne Coquelet as Madame de l'Estrade
- Jean Rousselière as Marcel de Clermont
- Fernand Baer as Le baron Cerf
- Max Réjean as Un cadet
- Jacques Christiany as Le dauphin
- Suzy Delair as Une soubrette de la Pompadour
- Pierre Léaud
- Théo Tony

== Bibliography ==
- Bock, Hans-Michael & Bergfelder, Tim. The Concise Cinegraph: Encyclopaedia of German Cinema. Berghahn Books, 2009.
- Dayna Oscherwitz & MaryEllen Higgins. The A to Z of French Cinema. Scarecrow Press, 2009.
