= Coquecigrole =

1931 film

- Directed by: André Berthomieu
- Written by: André Berthomieu
- Based on: Coquecigrole by Alfred Machard
- Produced by: Jacques Haïk
- Starring: Max Dearly; Danielle Darrieux; Gabrielle Fontan
- Cinematography: Jean Isnard; Armand Thirard
- Edited by: Jacques Desagneaux
- Music by: Marcel Pollet
- Production company: Les Établissements Jacques Haïk
- Distributed by: Les Établissements Jacques Haïk
- Release date: 22 December 1931
- Running time: 98 minutes
- Country: France
- Language: French

Coquecigrole is a 1931 French comedy drama film directed by André Berthomieu and starring Max Dearly, Danielle Darrieux and Gabrielle Fontan. It was based on a 1926 novel of the same title by Alfred Machard. The film's sets were designed by the art director Jean d'Eaubonne.

== Synopsis ==
Macarol, a former stage comedian now working as a waiter adopts the orphan Coquecigrole.

== Cast ==
- Max Dearly as Macarol
- Danielle Darrieux as Coquecigrole
- Gina Barbieri as Léocadie
- Armand Bour as Maître Petit-Durand
- Gabrielle Fontan as Mme. Bien
- René Donnio as Casimir
- Raymond Galle as Tulipe
- Georges Pally as Le directeur du théâtre
- Jean Guirec as Louvetier
- Jean Diéner as Jeaminet Bude
- Gaston Jacquet as Saint-Palmier

== Bibliography ==
- Bessy, Maurice & Chirat, Raymond. Histoire du cinéma français: 1929-1934. Pygmalion, 1988.
- Crisp, Colin. Genre, Myth and Convention in the French Cinema, 1929-1939. Indiana University Press, 2002.
- Goble, Alan. The Complete Index to Literary Sources in Film. Walter de Gruyter, 1999.
- Rège, Philippe. Encyclopedia of French Film Directors, Volume 1. Scarecrow Press, 2009.
