= Gaston Dupray =

Belgian actor (1886–1976)

Gaston Dupray (8 June 1886 – 12 December 1976) was a Belgian film actor.

Dupray was born Gaston Joseph Dopère in Schaerbeek and died in 1976 in Ixelles. Dupray spent most of his film career working in French cinema.

== Selected filmography ==
- Atlantis (1930)
- Hai-Tang (1930)
- A Caprice of Pompadour (1931)
- Azaïs (1931)
- The Lacquered Box (1932)
- Night Shift (1932)
- The Invisible Woman (1933)
- Little Jacques (1934)
- The Scandalous Couple (1935)
- Parisian Life (1936)
- Sisters in Arms (1937)
- The Beauty of Montparnasse (1937)
- In Venice, One Night (1937)
- The Man from Nowhere (1937)
- Judicial Error (1948)
