= Lucien Gallas =

French actor

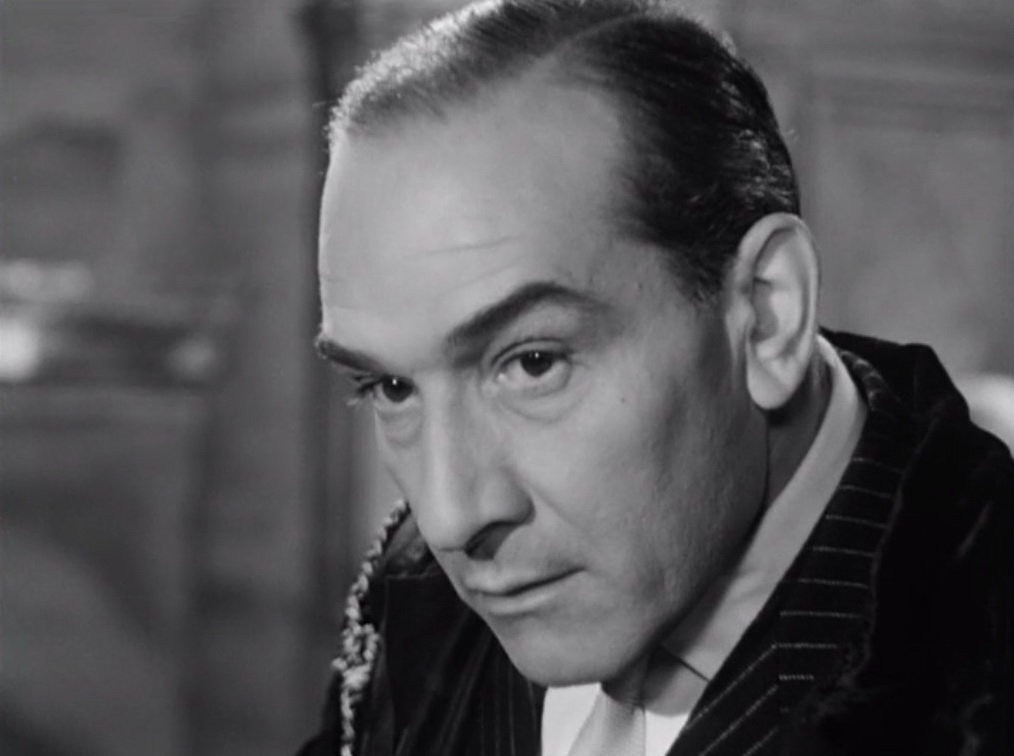
- Gallas in At the Edge of the City (1953)
- Born: March 23, 1904; Oullins, Rhône, France
- Died: May 26, 1967 (aged 63); Monaco
- Occupation: Actor
- Years active: 1931–1955
- Spouse(s): Ginette Leclerc (m. 19??)

Lucien Gallas (March 23, 1904 – May 26, 1967) was a French stage and film actor. He was married to the actress Ginette Leclerc.

== Selected filmography ==
- Holiday (1931)
- Billeting Order (1932)
- Little Jacques (1934)
- The Dying Land (1936)
- The Men Without Names (1937)
- Liberty (1938)
- Thérèse Martin (1939)
- The Corsican Brothers (1939)
- The Benefactor (1942)
- Fever (1942)
- The Exile's Song (1943)
- Night Shift (1944)
- The Woman with the Orchid (1952)
- Prisoners of Darkness (1952)
- At the Edge of the City (1953)
- My Life Is Yours (1953)
- Days of Love (1954)

== Bibliography ==
- Waldman, Harry. Maurice Tourneur: The Life and Films. McFarland, 2001.
