= Bécassine (1940 film) =

1940 film

- Directed by: Pierre Caron
- Written by: René Pujol; Jean Nohain
- Produced by: Pierre Caron; Charles Tenneson
- Starring: Paulette Dubost; Max Dearly; Alice Tissot
- Cinematography: Willy Faktorovitch
- Edited by: Madeleine Cathelin; André Gug
- Music by: Raoul Moretti
- Production company: Pierre Caron Productions
- Distributed by: Distribution Parisienne de Films
- Release date: 3 September 1940
- Running time: 93 minutes
- Country: France
- Language: French

Bécassine is a 1940 French comedy film directed by Pierre Caron and starring Max Dearly, Paulette Dubost and Marguerite Deval. It is an adaptation of the French comic series Bécassine. The film's sets were designed by the art director Jean Douarinou.

== Cast ==
- Paulette Dubost as Bécassine
- Max Dearly as Monsieur Proey-Minans
- Marguerite Deval as Madame Tampico
- Marcel Vallée as L'oncle
- Annie France as Annie de Grand-Air
- Alice Tissot as La marquise de Grand-Air
- Nita Raya as Arlette
- Daniel Clérice as José Tampico
- José Sergy as Chancerelle
- Roger Legris as Ilario

== See also ==
- Bécassine (2018)

== Bibliography ==
- Bessy, Maurice & Chirat, Raymond. Histoire du cinéma français: encyclopédie des films, 1940–1950. Pygmalion, 1986.
- Rège, Philippe. Encyclopedia of French Film Directors, Volume 1. Scarecrow Press, 2009.
