= Marcel Barencey =

French actor

- Born: 4 January 1903; Vesoul, Haute-Saône, France
- Died: 23 June 1971 (aged 68); Saint-Maur-des-Fossés, Val-de-Marne, France
- Occupation: Actor
- Years active: 1927–1938 (film)

Marcel Barencey (1893–1971) was a French stage and film actor. He is often credited simply as Barencey.

He was married to the actress Odette Barencey.

== Biography ==
Marcel Fitsch was born at 4 Rue Saint-Georges in Vesoul.

Marcel Barencey was married to the actress Odette Barencey.

== Selected filmography ==
- The Marriage of Mademoiselle Beulemans (1927)
- I'll Be Alone After Midnight (1931)
- Monsieur Albert (1932)
- Aces of the Turf (1932)
- Night Shift (1932)
- Clochard (1932)
- Number 33 (1933)
- Skylark (1934)
- Cease Firing (1934)
- The Darling of His Concierge (1934)
- Rasputin (1938)
- Education of a Prince (1938)

== Bibliography ==
- Goble, Alan. The Complete Index to Literary Sources in Film. Walter de Gruyter, 1999.
