= The Red Robe =

1933 film

- Directed by: Jean de Marguenat
- Written by: Eugène Brieux (play)
- Starring: Constant Remy; Suzanne Rissler; Marcelle Praince; Jacques Grétillat
- Cinematography: Coutelen; André Dantan; Enzo Riccioni
- Edited by: Raymond Lamy
- Music by: Adolphe Borchard
- Production company: Gaumont-Franco Film
- Distributed by: Gaumont-Franco Film; Europa Film
- Release date: 1933
- Running time: 91 minutes
- Country: France
- Language: French

The Red Robe sometimes translated as The Red Dress (French: La robe rouge) is a 1933 French drama film directed by Jean de Marguenat and starring Constant Remy, Suzanne Rissler and Marcelle Praince. It is based on a 1900 play by Eugène Brieux. The film's sets were designed by the art director Aimé Bazin.

== Cast ==
- Constant Rémy as Le procureur Vagret
- Suzanne Rissler as Yanetta
- Marcelle Praince as Madame Vagret
- Jacques Grétillat as Mouzon
- Daniel Mendaille as Etchepare
- Pierre Arnaudy as L'écolier
- Marcelle Barry as Madame Bunerat
- Robert Charlys as Le bedeau
- Alexandre Colas as Le boulanger
- Gaston Dubosc as Le Bouzule
- Jean Dunot as Benoît
- Lily Fairlie as Bertha
- Anthony Gildès as Delorme
- Isidora as Madame Birman
- Pierre Juvenet as Le président des assises
- Tony Laurent as Le directeur de prison
- Raoul Marco as Bridet
- Pierre Marnat as Le lieutenant de gendarmerie
- Georges Mauloy as Le procureur général
- Marthe Mellot as La mère d'Etchepare
- Armand Morins as Brunerat
- Pierre Munié as Maître Ardeuil
- Marthe Sarbel as Madame La Bouzule
- Louis Vonelly as Maître Placat
- Cécile Barrette
- Andrée Doria

== Bibliography ==
- Lucy Mazdon & Catherine Wheatley. Je T Aime... Moi Non Plus: Franco-British Cinematic Relations. Berghahn Books, 2010.
