= Little Jacques (1934 film) =

1934 film

- Directed by: Gaston Roudès
- Written by: Jules Clarétie (novel); Gaston Roudès
- Starring: Constant Rémy; Line Noro; Jacques Varennes
- Cinematography: Léonce-Henri Burel; Billy Elsom; Henri Janvier
- Edited by: Andrée Feix
- Release date: 21 December 1934
- Running time: 108 minutes
- Country: France
- Language: French

Little Jacques (French: Le petit Jacques) is a 1934 French drama film directed by Gaston Roudès and starring Constant Rémy, Line Noro and Jacques Varennes.

The film's sets were designed by Jean d'Eaubonne.

== Cast ==
- Constant Rémy as Noël Rambert
- Line Noro as Marthe Rambert
- Jacques Varennes as Daniel Mortal
- Annie Ducaux as Claire Mortal
- Gaby Triquet as Le petit Jacques
- Madeleine Guitty as La concierge
- Pauline Carton as Mademoiselle Julie
- Lucien Gallas as Paul Laverdac
- Jean Dax as Le juge d'instruction
- Jean Joffre as Docteur Arthez
- Gaston Dupray as L'avocat
- Louis Charco as Denis Gobergeau
- Jacques Berlioz

== Bibliography ==
- Dayna Oscherwitz & MaryEllen Higgins. The A to Z of French Cinema. Scarecrow Press, 2009.
