= The Men Without Names =

- Directed by: Jean Vallée
- Written by: Jean Desvallières (novel); Jean Vallée
- Starring: Constant Rémy; Maurice Rémy; Arthur Devère
- Cinematography: Georges Million
- Music by: Jane Bos
- Production company: Votre Film
- Distributed by: Société d'Édition et de Location de Films
- Release date: 1 December 1937
- Running time: 94 minutes
- Country: France
- Language: French

The Men Without Names (French: Les hommes sans nom) is a 1937 French action film directed by Jean Vallée and starring Constant Rémy, Maurice Rémy and Arthur Devère. It portrays the French Foreign Legion in North Africa. It was shot at Victorine Studios in Nice. The film's sets were designed by the art director Jean d'Eaubonne.

== Cast ==
- Constant Rémy as Le colonel de Joyeuse
- Maurice Rémy as Le capitaine Vallerse
- Arthur Devère as Schumbe, l'ordonnance
- Paul Escoffier as Le lieutenant Djeroï
- Lucien Gallas as Le sergent Brandt
- Suzet Maïs as Jennifer
- Paulette Houry as Ijo
- Tania Fédor as Madame de Joyeuse
- Robert Ozanne as Pancraz
- Charles Redgie as Le capitaine Willburn
- A.S. Takal as Mohamed Hamou
- Georges Péclet as Le capitaine Maréchal
- Lucas Gridoux as Le caïd Hadj-Ayar
- Thomy Bourdelle as Bordage

== Bibliography ==
- David Henry Slavin. Colonial Cinema and Imperial France, 1919–1939: White Blind Spots, Male Fantasies, Settler Myths. JHU Press, 2001.
