= Max Dearly =

French actor (1874–1943)

- Born: Lucien Paul Marie-Joseph Rolland; 22 November 1874; Paris, France
- Died: 2 June 1943 (aged 68); Neuilly-sur-Seine, France
- Occupation(s): Stage and film actor

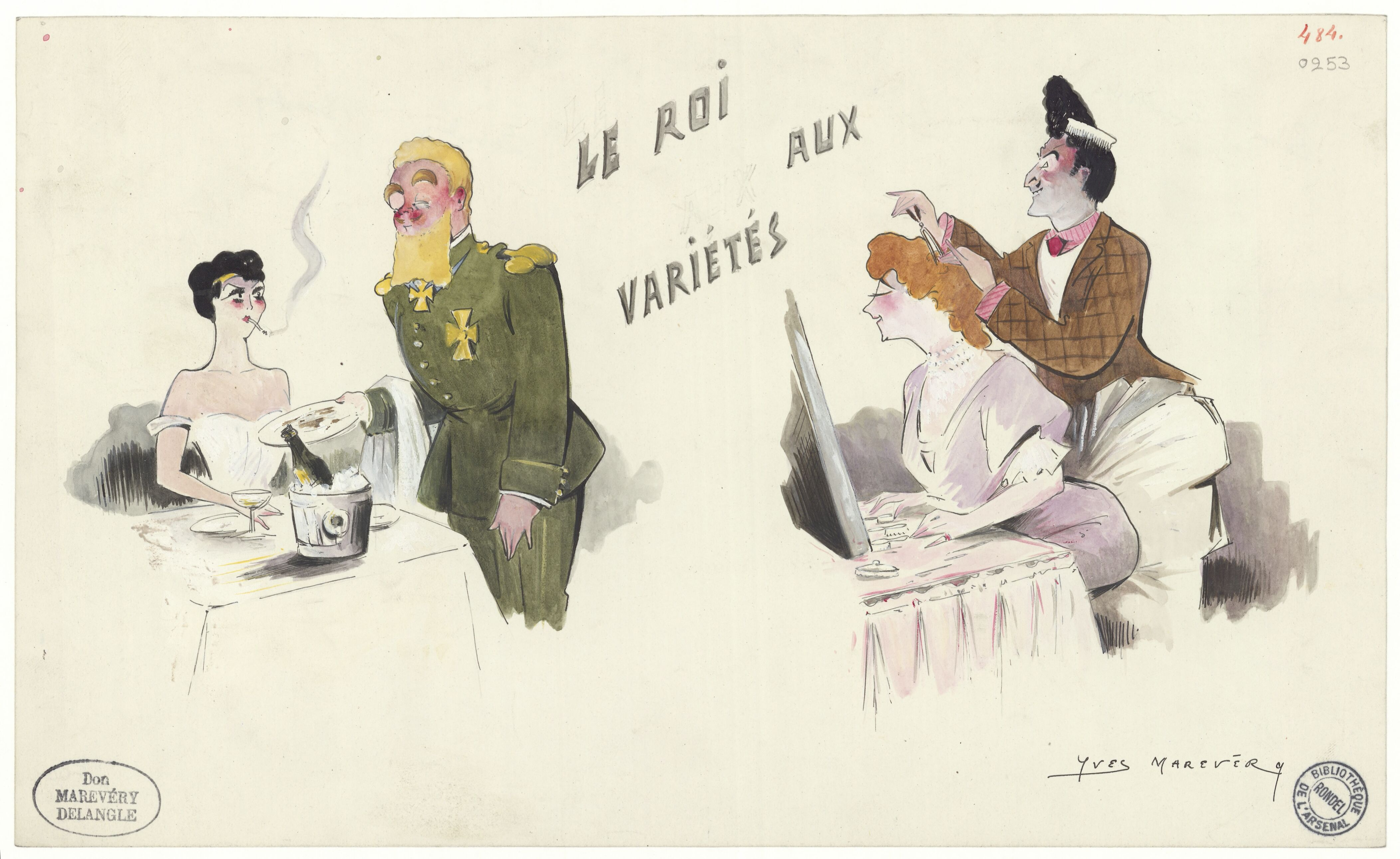
"The King" by Gaston Arman de Caillavet, Robert de Flers, Emmanuel Arène / drawing by Yves Marevéry

Max Dearly (22 November 1874 – 2 June 1943) was a French stage and film actor.

Dearly was born Lucien Paul Marie-Joseph Rolland in Paris, and died in Neuilly-sur-Seine on the 2 June 1943.

== Partial filmography ==
- Le bonheur sous la main (1911)
- Coquecigrole (1931) - Macarol
- Azaïs (1931) - Baron Wurtz
- Tossing Ship (1932) - Le député Puy-Pradal
- Love and Luck (1932) - Jeff Chester
- Madame Bovary (1934) - Homais
- Les Misérables (1934) - M. Gillenormand
- Arlette and Her Fathers (1934) - Mérové
- The Last Billionaire (1934) - Banco
- If I Were Boss (1934) - M. Maubert
- A Rare Bird (1935) - Melleville
- Paris Camargue (1935) - Jules Fabrejoul
- La Vie parisienne (1936) - Ramiro Mendoza
- Parisian Life (1936) - Don Ramiro de Mendoza
- La reine des resquilleuses (1937) - John
- Claudine at School (1937) - Le père de Claudine
- Troubled Heart (1938) - Géodésias
- The Train for Venice (1938) - M. Chardonne
- Le grand élan (1939) - Barsac
- Nine Bachelors (1939) - Athanase Outriquet
- Claudine (1940)
- Bécassine (1940) - Monsieur Adhémar de Proey-Minans
- The Suitors Club (1941) - Le prince Nirvanoff (final film role)
