= The Dying Land =

1936 film

- Directed by: Jean Vallée
- Written by: René Bazin (novel); Charles Spaak
- Starring: Pierre Larquey; Simone Bourday; Line Noro
- Cinematography: Raymond Clunie; Marcel Lucien
- Music by: Jane Bos
- Production company: Paris Color Films
- Distributed by: Paris Color Films
- Release date: 1936
- Running time: 88 minutes
- Country: France
- Language: French

The Dying Land (French: La terre qui meurt) is a 1936 French colour drama film directed by Jean Vallée and starring Pierre Larquey, Simone Bourday and Line Noro. It is based on a novel by René Bazin, previously adapted into a 1927 silent film of the same title.

The film's sets were designed by the art director Roland Quignon.

== Cast ==
- Pierre Larquey as Le père Lumineau
- Robert Arnoux as François
- Mady Berry as La Michelonne
- Raymond Bouquet
- Simone Bourday as Marie Rose
- Jean Cyrano
- Paul Demange
- Georges Flamant
- Lucien Gallas as André
- Robert Goupil
- Marcelle Monthil as La deuxième Michelonne
- Line Noro as Eléonore
- Alexandre Rignault as Matharin
- Noël Roquevert
- Germaine Sablon as Felicite

== See also ==
- List of early color feature films

== Bibliography ==
- Crisp, Colin. French Cinema—A Critical Filmography: Volume 1, 1929-1939. Indiana University Press, 2015.
