= At the Edge of the City =

1953 film by Carlo Lizzani

- Directed by: Carlo Lizzani; Massimo Mida(co-director)
- Written by: Angelo D'Alessandro
- Produced by: Fernando Croce
- Starring: Giulietta Masina; Massimo Girotti; Marina Berti; Michel Jourdan
- Cinematography: Gianni Di Venanzo
- Edited by: Guido Bertoli; Jenner Menghi
- Music by: Franco Mannino
- Distributed by: Elios Film
- Release date: 5 March 1953
- Running time: 96 minutes
- Country: Italy
- Language: Italian

At the Edge of the City (Italian: Ai margini della metropoli) is a 1953 Italian crime film drama directed by Carlo Lizzani. The film stars Massimo Girotti, Marina Berti and Giulietta Masina. In Rome a young man is falsely accused of killing his girlfriend. It was shot at the Palatino Studios in Rome and on location in the city. The film used neorealist style and was based on a real-life case.

== Plot ==
Mario Ilari, a young unemployed worker, is unjustly accused of killing a girl he knows of him. Once arrested, he manages to escape and hide in the house of his partner Gina, but ends up in prison again. The lawyer Roberto Marini agrees to take his defense after being contacted by Luisa, a friend of Gina, convinced that the trial will give him the opportunity to assert himself. The situation, however, is complicated by the fact that Calì, a homeless man, says he saw Ilari at the scene of the crime. Ilari confesses that he met Greta through a female friend, who should have facilitated his expatriation. When the lawyer Marini accuses Calì of perjury, he kills himself. The situation is resolved when the body of Greta is found, killed by the real culprit after being kidnapped. Ilari is freed and Marini and Luisa confess their mutual love.

== Cast ==
- Massimo Girotti as Avv. Roberto Martini
- Marina Berti as Luisa
- Giulietta Masina as Gina Ilari
- Michel Jourdan as Mario Ilari
- Lucien Gallas as P.C.
- Rossana Martini as Elena
- Adriana Sivieri as Greta
- Patrizia Lari as Betty
- Paola Borboni as Madre di Luisa
- Giulio Calì as Calì
- Amilcare Fabrizio as Fabrizio
- Antonio Nicotra
- Benedetta Rutili
- Cesare Fantoni
- Carlo d'Elia
- Giuliano Montaldo
- Andrea Petricca
- Franco Caruso
- Bruno Berellini
- Maria Laura Rocca

== Bibliography ==
- Moliterno, Gino. The A to Z of Italian Cinema. Scarecrow Press, 2009.
