= Nicole and Her Virtue =

1932 film

- Directed by: René Hervil
- Written by: Félix Gandéra (play); René Hervil
- Produced by: Jacques Haïk
- Starring: Alice Cocéa; André Roanne; Paulette Duvernet
- Cinematography: Robert Lefebvre; Julien Ringel
- Music by: Albert Chantrier
- Production company: Les Établissements Jacques Haïk
- Release date: 3 January 1932
- Running time: 100 minutes
- Country: France
- Language: French

Nicole and Her Virtue (French: Nicole et sa vertu) is a 1932 French drama film directed by René Hervil and starring Alice Cocéa, André Roanne and Paulette Duvernet. It adapts a play by Félix Gandéra.

== Cast ==
- Alice Cocéa as Nicole Versin
- André Roanne as Lucien Versin
- Paulette Duvernet as Mado Vinci
- Andrée Méry as Mme. Buzet
- Claude Barghon as Le petit François
- Robert Goupil as Lafillette
- Enrique Rivero as Luisito

== Bibliography ==
- Crisp, Colin. Genre, Myth and Convention in the French Cinema, 1929-1939. Indiana University Press, 2002.
