= Jean Vallée (director) =

French film director

- Born: 20 January 1889; Mondeville, Calvados, France
- Died: 19 July 1979 (aged 90); Antibes, Alpes-Maritimes, France
- Occupations: Director, Screenwriter
- Years active: 1930–1953 (film)

Jean Vallée (20 January 1899 – 19 July 1979) was a French film director, screenwriter and ran an art-house cinema theater L'Œil de Paris. He was credited for directing the first two French films in color.

== Filmography ==
- Jeunes filles à marier (1935) - first colour feature shot in France
- La Terre qui meurt (1936) - second French colour feature-length film
- The Men Without Names (1937)
- Troubled Heart (1938)
- Les surprises d'une nuit de noces (1952)
- L'étrange amazone (1953)
