= His Other Love =

1934 film

- Directed by: Alfred Machard; Constant Rémy
- Written by: Alfred Machard
- Starring: Constant Rémy; Jeanne Boitel; Saturnin Fabre
- Cinematography: Léonce-Henri Burel
- Music by: Marcel Pollet
- Production company: Studio Montmartre
- Distributed by: La Compagnie Indépendante de Distribution
- Release date: 23 February 1934
- Running time: 98 minutes
- Country: France
- Language: French

His Other Love (French: Son autre amour) is a 1934 French drama film directed by Alfred Machard and Constant Rémy and starring Rémy, Jeanne Boitel, Saturnin Fabre and Alice Tissot. The film's sets were designed by the art director Roland Quignon.

== Synopsis ==
A widower sends his son away to boarding school and takes up with an attractive woman. His son increasingly feels abandoned by his father due to his new romance.

== Cast ==
- Constant Rémy as Tardier
- Jeanne Boitel as Hélène
- Saturnin Fabre as Monsieur Léopard - le directeur
- Alice Tissot as Aurore
- Christiane Dor as Rosalie
- Solange Bertrand as La bonne
- Colette Borelli as La petite Blanche
- Teddy Dargy as La directrice
- Cécile Didier as La concierge
- René Donnio as Martin
- Riri as Une enfant
- Raymond Rognoni as Paturel
- Roncier as Le petit Dédé

== Bibliography ==
- Bessy, Maurice & Chirat, Raymond. Histoire du cinéma français: 1929-1934. Pygmalion, 1988.
- Crisp, Colin. Genre, Myth and Convention in the French Cinema, 1929-1939. Indiana University Press, 2002.
- Rège, Philippe. Encyclopedia of French Film Directors, Volume 1. Scarecrow Press, 2009.
