= Romano Calò =

Italian actor (1883–1952)

- Born: 6 May 1883; Rome, Italy
- Died: 17 August 1952 (aged 69); Lugano, Switzerland
- Occupation: Actor
- Years active: 1913–1945

Romano Calò (6 May 1883 – 17 August 1952) was an Italian film actor. He appeared in 30 films between 1913 and 1945.

== Selected filmography ==
- Il bacio di Cirano (1913)
- But It Isn't Serious (1921)
- Queen of the Night (1931)
- Steel (1933)
- The Anonymous Roylott (1936)
- The Last Days of Pompeo (1937)
- The Count of Brechard (1938)
- The Hero of Venice (1941)
- The Last Chance (1945)
