= Salto Mortale (1931 German film) =

1931 German drama film

- Directed by: Ewald André Dupont
- Written by: Rudolph Cartier; Egon Eis; Alfred Machard (novel); Carl Zuckmayer
- Produced by: Israel Rosenfeld
- Starring: Anna Sten; Anton Walbrook; Reinhold Bernt
- Cinematography: Friedl Behn-Grund; Akos Farkas
- Edited by: W.L. Bagier; Max Brenner
- Music by: Paul Dessau; Artur Guttmann; Walter Jurmann
- Production company: Harmonie-Film
- Distributed by: Süd-Film
- Release date: 14 August 1931
- Running time: 95 minutes
- Country: Germany
- Language: German

Salto Mortale is a 1931 German drama film directed by Ewald André Dupont and starring Anna Sten, Anton Walbrook and Reinhold Bernt. A circus film, it has been described as being "in all but name a sound film remake of Variety" and was a box office success.

The film's sets were designed by the art directors Alfred Junge and Fritz Maurischat. It was made at the Babelelsberg Studios in Berlin. Location filming took place at the Circus Busch in the city. A separate French-language version was also made by Dupont.

== Cast ==
- Anna Sten as Marina
- Anton Walbrook as Robby - gennant Studienrat
- Reinhold Bernt as Jim
- Otto Wallburg as Pressechef
- Kurt Gerron as Grimby
- Grethe Weiser as Robbys Freundin

== Bibliography ==
- Bergfelder, Tim & Cargnelli, Christian. Destination London: German-speaking emigrés and British cinema, 1925-1950. Berghahn Books, 2008.
