= Queen of the Night (1931 German-language film) =

1931 film directed by Fritz Wendhausen

- Directed by: Fritz Wendhausen
- Written by: Harry Kahn; Marcel L'Herbier; Alfred Machard; Ernst Neubach; Hans Wilhelm
- Produced by: Walter Conradt; Heinz Leiser
- Starring: Friedl Haerlin; Karl Ludwig Diehl; Walter Janssen
- Cinematography: Günther Krampf
- Music by: Will Meisel; Otto Stransky
- Production companies: Les Établissements Braunberger-Richebé; Länderfilm
- Release date: 7 February 1931
- Running time: 84 minutes
- Country: France
- Language: German

Queen of the Night (German: Königin einer Nacht) is a 1931 French musical comedy film directed by Fritz Wendhausen and starring Friedl Haerlin, Karl Ludwig Diehl and Walter Janssen. It is an operetta film. It is the German-language version of the French film La Femme d'une nuit. A separate Italian version was also made. Multiple-language versions were a common feature of the early years of sound before dubbing became firmly established.

The film's sets were designed by the art director Pierre Schild.

== Cast ==
- Friedl Haerlin as Königin Eleana
- Karl Ludwig Diehl as Adjudant
- Walter Janssen as Paul d'Armont
- Peggy Norman as Prinzessin Natascha
- Adele Sandrock as Gräfin Markowicz
- Otto Wallburg as Gaston Molneau
- Paul Morgan as Der Gesandte
- Albert Paulig as Geschäftsführer
- Julius Falkenstein
- Harry Bender
- Ludwig Stössel
- Gustl Gstettenbaur
- Friedrich Ettel
- Marion Gerth
- Marianne Kupfer
- Lotte Stein
- Toni Tetzlaff
- Hans Wassmann

== Bibliography ==
- Grange, William. Cultural Chronicle of the Weimar Republic. Scarecrow Press, 2008.
