= When Midnight Strikes =

1936 film

- Directed by: Léo Joannon
- Written by: Alfred Machard
- Based on: When Midnight Strikes by Alfred Machard
- Produced by: Hans Boekman
- Starring: Marie Bell; Pierre Renoir; Roger Karl
- Cinematography: Boris Kaufman
- Music by: Jean Wiener
- Production company: France Europe Films
- Release date: 27 November 1936
- Running time: 80 minutes
- Countries: France; Netherlands
- Language: French

When Midnight Strikes (French: Quand minuit sonnera) is a 1936 French-Dutch crime drama film directed by Léo Joannon and starring Marie Bell, Pierre Renoir and Roger Karl. It was adapted by Alfred Machard from his own novel of the same title. The film's sets were designed by the art director Jacques-Laurent Atthalin. A separate Dutch-language version Klokslag twaalf was also produced.

== Cast ==
- Marie Bell as Mattia
- Pierre Renoir as Jean Verdier
- Roger Karl as Rouque
- René Bergeron as Le capitaine
- Simone Barillier as Régine
- Thomy Bourdelle as Eric Schutz
- Lucien Callamand as Le maître d'hôtel
- Marcel Dalio
- Edith Gallia
- Enrico Glori
- Charles Lemontier

== Bibliography ==
- Bessy, Maurice & Chirat, Raymond. Histoire du cinéma français: 1935-1939. Pygmalion, 1986.
- Crisp, Colin. Genre, Myth and Convention in the French Cinema, 1929-1939. Indiana University Press, 2002.
- Rège, Philippe. Encyclopedia of French Film Directors, Volume 1. Scarecrow Press, 2009.
