= Grand Rex =

Cinema and concert venue in Paris, France

Le Grand Rex
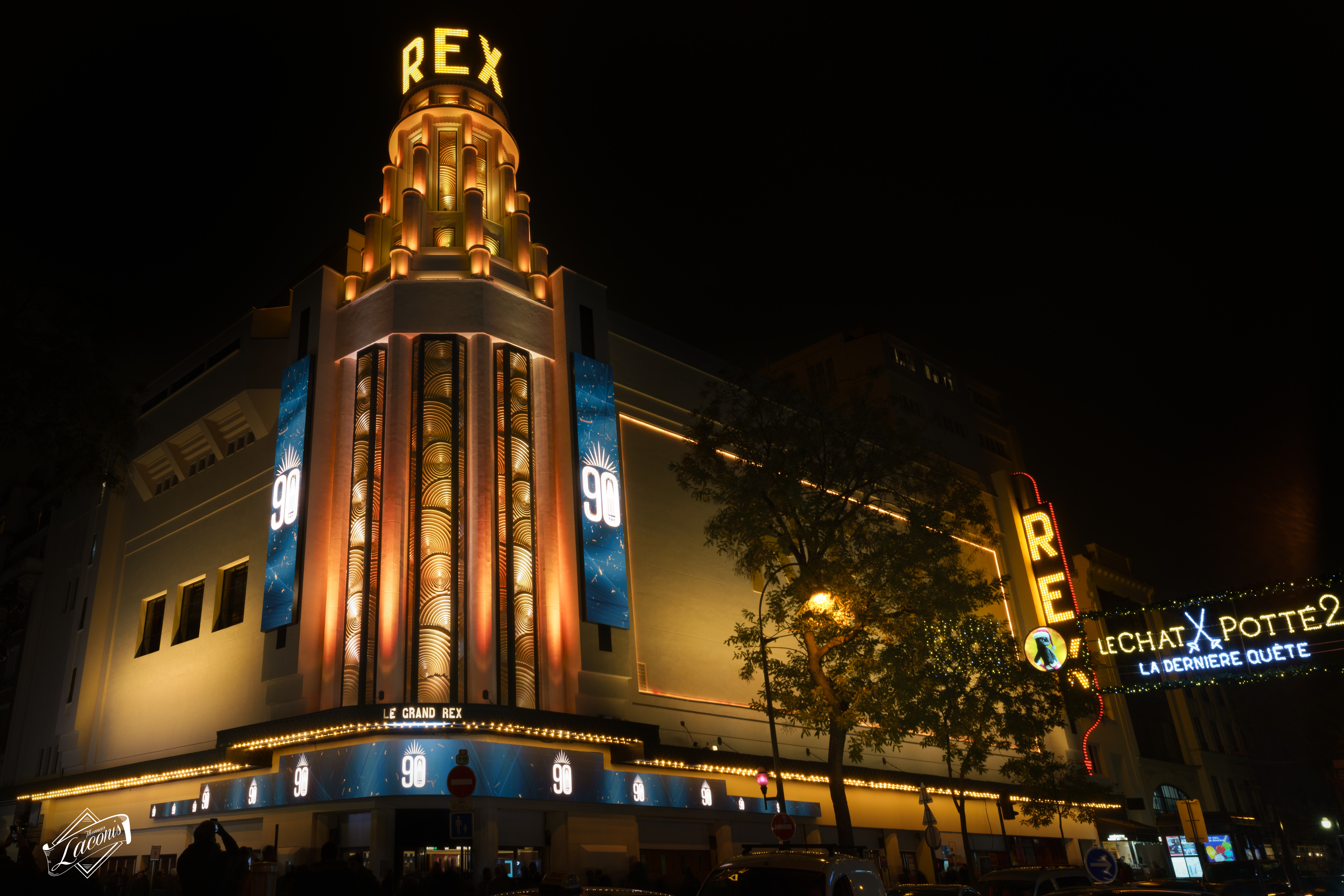
- New facade restored to the 1932
- Interactive map of Le Grand Rex
- Former names: Le Rex
- Location: Paris, France
- Coordinates: 48.870550°N 2.347750°E
- Owner: Alexandre Hellmann
- Operator: SAS Le Grand Rex Paris
- Capacity: 2,702
- Type: Cinema
- Screens: 7 screening halls 1 concert and show venue 1 club (Rex Club); 1 Museum (Rex Studios)

Construction
- Opened: December 8, 1932
- Architects: Auguste Bluysen, John Eberson

Website
- www.legrandrex.com

Le Grand Rex is a cinema and concert venue in Paris, France.

== Location and access ==
Le Grand Rex is located at No. 1, boulevard Poissonnière in the 2nd arrondissement, on the grands boulevards.

The cinema's facades and roofs, as well as its hall and its decor, have been listed as a Monument historique since a decree on October 5, 1981. This giant cinema has a capacity of more than 2,700 people in its great hall and posts an average attendance level of 1 million visitors per year.

Le Grand Rex is served by the Metro lines 8 and 9 at the Bonne-Nouvelle station, as well as by bus lines 20, 32, and 39.

== History ==
In the early 1930s, Jacques Haïk, a wealthy movie producer, distributor and owner of the Olympia, got the idea of building a very extravagant cinema: which could have a capacity of more than 5000 spectators on a surface area of 2,000 m², with a ceiling peaking at more than 30 meters, representing a luminous starry vault.

Its designers are the architect Auguste Bluysen and the engineer John Eberson. The façade was designed by the sculptor Henri-Édouard Navarre and the decoration of the great hall was by Maurice Dufrêne.

The Grand Rex is a scale model of the famous Radio City Music Hall in New York City.

The cinema is also known for its interior décor. Specialized in "atmospheric halls", its architects built more than 400 decors of phantasmatic cities under cloudy, clear or starry skies in the United States.

Here, the great hall has been decorated by an "ancient Mediterranean" city in relief, located in the open air with its colorful walls reproducing the Art Deco atmosphere of the "French Riviera" villas.

All of the architect's desires were fulfilled, except for the number of seats, which originally had to be reduced to 3,300.

The Grand Rex hall opens its doors on the evening of December 8, 1932, in the presence of the cinema's pioneer, Louis Lumière and 3,300 guests. The Three Musketeers by Henri Diamant-Berger is on the bill.

It is one of the biggest halls in Paris.

The projection booth is located in the corbel of the rue Poissonnière. The angle lantern is actually a simple metal trellis on which was projected cement mortar.

The producer and director Émile Couzinet opened a small Rex in Bordeaux (800 seats), designed by the same architects, which stayed open until the 1970s.

Despite the success of the Grand Rex, Jacques Haïk files for bankruptcy and sells it to Gaumont, before Jean Hellmann, Alan Byre and Laudy Lawrence buy it themselves.

=== From the 1940s to the 1980s ===
During the Occupation, the Grand Rex was requisitioned by the German army, which turned it into a Soldatenkino, saving it for its troops of soldiers on leave. In September 1942, it was the target of a bombing by the Détachement Valmy. The cinema reopened on October 13, 1944, after the Liberation of Paris. It showed an American film, with chewing gums available during the intermission. From April 12 to June 22, 1945, it temporarily closed and turned into a welcome center for the repatriated war prisoners. In 1946, Pinocchio became the first Disney feature film to be shown there.

At that time, the program of Grand Rex was divided into two parts, with an intermission in between: a first part with a musical opening and the news, a second part with attractions (waterfalls, erupting volcanos…) and then the proper film. Dancers, musicians, machinery and ushers were therefore necessary for the smooth running of the show.

Starting on December 4, 1953, the first feature film in CinemaScope, The Robe, directed by Henry Koster, was projected there in tandem with the Normandie cinema located on the Champs-Elysées. In 1950 already, during the screening of Gone with the Wind, the projectionist had enlarged the image during fire scenes.

After the failure of the "Le Miroir de Neptune" (The Neptune Mirror) attraction in 1953 (swimmers performing in a transparent pool placed on the stage), the "Féerie des eaux" (Magic waters) attraction was created in March 1954, during which 3,000 liters are projected twenty meters high with lighting effects and a musical accompaniment. It is a success: water shows have enlivened the great hall every year at Christmas since 1954, the "Féerie des eaux" (Magic waters), shortly before the screening of the end-of-the-year Disney film.

In 1957, the escalator of the Grand Rex was inaugurated by Gary Cooper and Mylène Demongeot, superseding elevators. It was the first time a European hall was equipped with such material.

In 1960, the cinema experienced a better attendance level than the Louvre Museum. Eight years later, the combination of the "Féerie des eaux" (Magic waters) and The Jungle Book enabled the Grand Rex to receive around 500,000 spectators.

In 1963, Alfred Hitchcock presented his new movie, The Birds there.

In 1974, three small halls were added to the complex, at the location of the dressing and rehearsal rooms. The Rex Club, a disco club, replaces the "Rêve" dancing, a chic establishment which was created in 1932.

=== Since the 1980s ===
In 1984, the Grand Rex included seven halls, then eight in 1990, but without having needed to divide the great hall, going against a trend noticeable in other cinemas. The Grand Rex and its Art Deco facade are listed in the inventory of the Monument historique in 1981.

In 1988, Le Grand Large ("The Great Large") was installed: a 300 square meters screen stretching over 81 feet wide and 37 feet tall, making it the biggest non-IMAX screen in Europe. Designed and created by Luc Heripret, it was inaugurated by French filmmaker Luc Besson's The Big Blue, which totalled 700,000 tickets sold at the Grand Rex after months on the bill.

In 1997, the Grand Rex opened its program to festivals, concerts, and solo performances of many artists who performed on stage.

In 1988, New Zealand filmmaker Peter Jackson received an award for his film Bad Taste there. In 2002, American singer Britney Spears was present for the screening of Crossroads, causing a riot, during which some outside windows were shattered.

In 2009, the façade was equipped with digital signs, whose light showcases its Art Deco column.

In 2017, the great hall was renovated.

In 2020, from February 22 to March 11, American singer-songwriter Madonna performed her last eight shows of her Madame X Tour; however, three of the scheduled performances were cancelled.

While its contemporary attendance levels are usually close to a million spectators, the COVID-19 pandemic forced the Grand Rex to close in August 2020, after attempting at the end of the first lockdown in June, to screen retrospectives and thematic marathons. Starting from December of the same year, the cinema was fully renovated.

The Grand Rex currently has a capacity of over 2,700 spectators in its great hall.

Additionally, it hosts premieres with the films' crews as well as special events called "Marathons", which gather fans of a franchise; e.g. Harry Potter, The Hunger Games, the Marvel Cinematic Universe, Star Wars, and various adaptations of J. R. R. Tolkien's work.

In 2023, the film Oppenheimer premiered at the Grand Rex. In 2026, the film Disclosure Day also premiered at the Grand Rex.

== Technical specifications ==
- Equipment: 7 halls of 2,702, 500, 262, 210, 155, 125 and 100 seats; screening in 35 mm and digital–stereophonic sound in Dolby/Digital Theater Systems
- Owner: Marianne Hellmann
- Operator: SAS Le Grand Rex Paris

=== Great Hall ===
- 2,700 seats,
- Large and comfortable leather chairs for the orchestra,
- A mezzanine equipped with the same chairs as the orchestra,
- A 2nd balcony with 1,200 seats,
- A luminous arch,
- A large adjustable stage (shows and concerts),
- A stage screen which is 16.9 meters large and 7 meters high, located on the stage (under the luminous arch),
- Three DP 32 4K projectors,
- A screen named “Le Grand Large” (The Great Large), which is 24.9 meters large and 11.35 meters high (about 280 m²). It is uncoiled and coiled in front of the luminous arch.
The Grand Rex

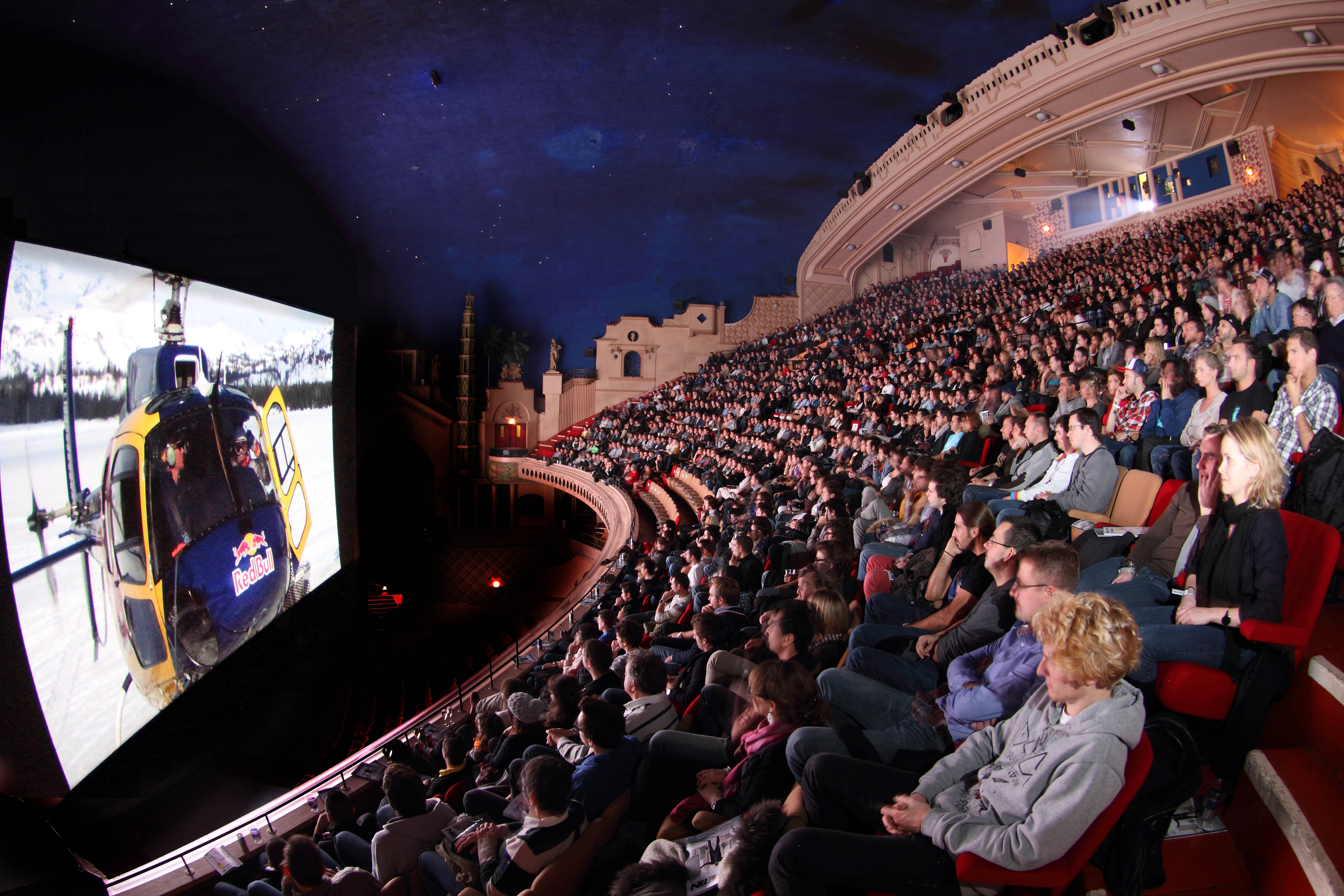

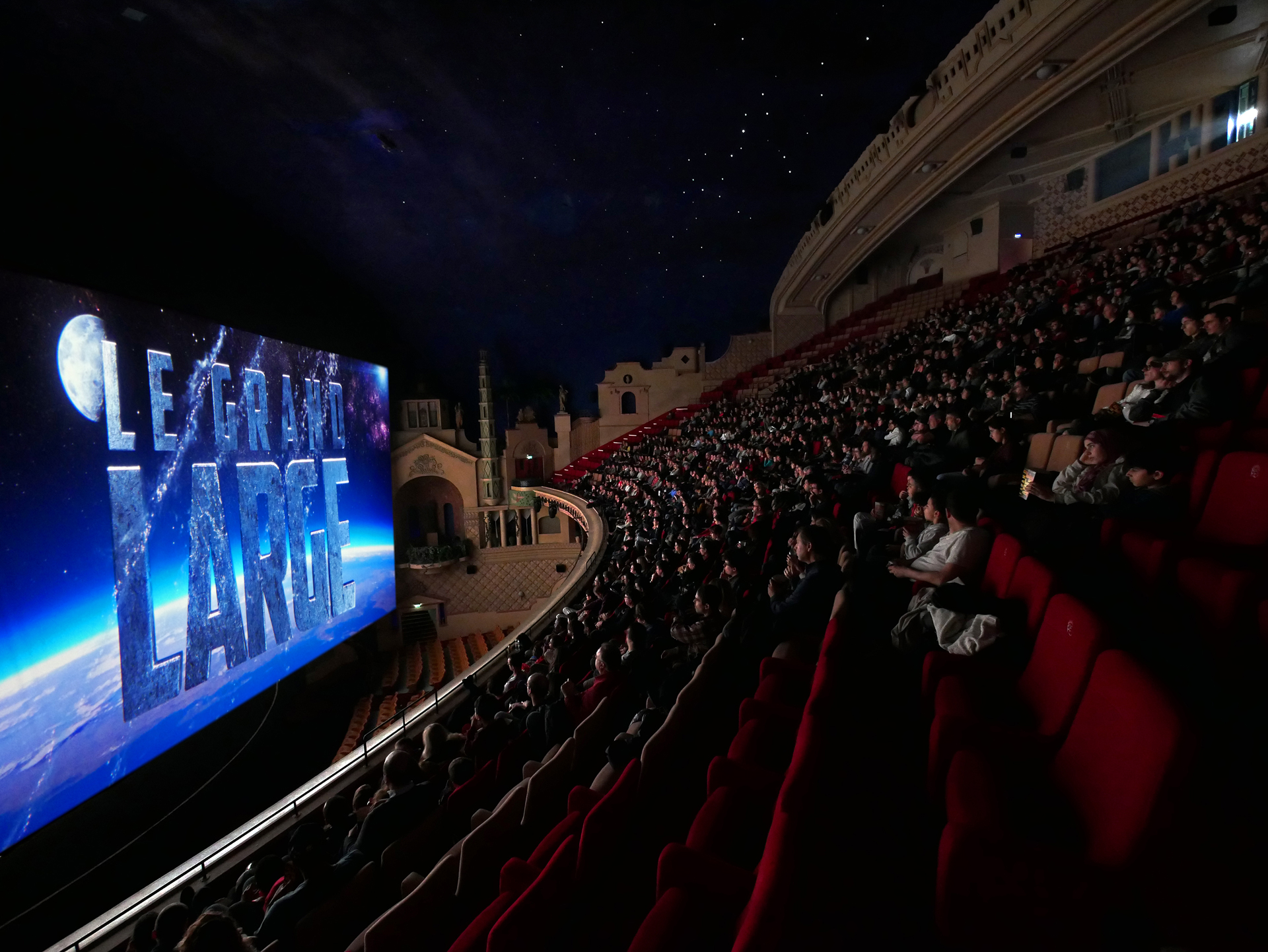

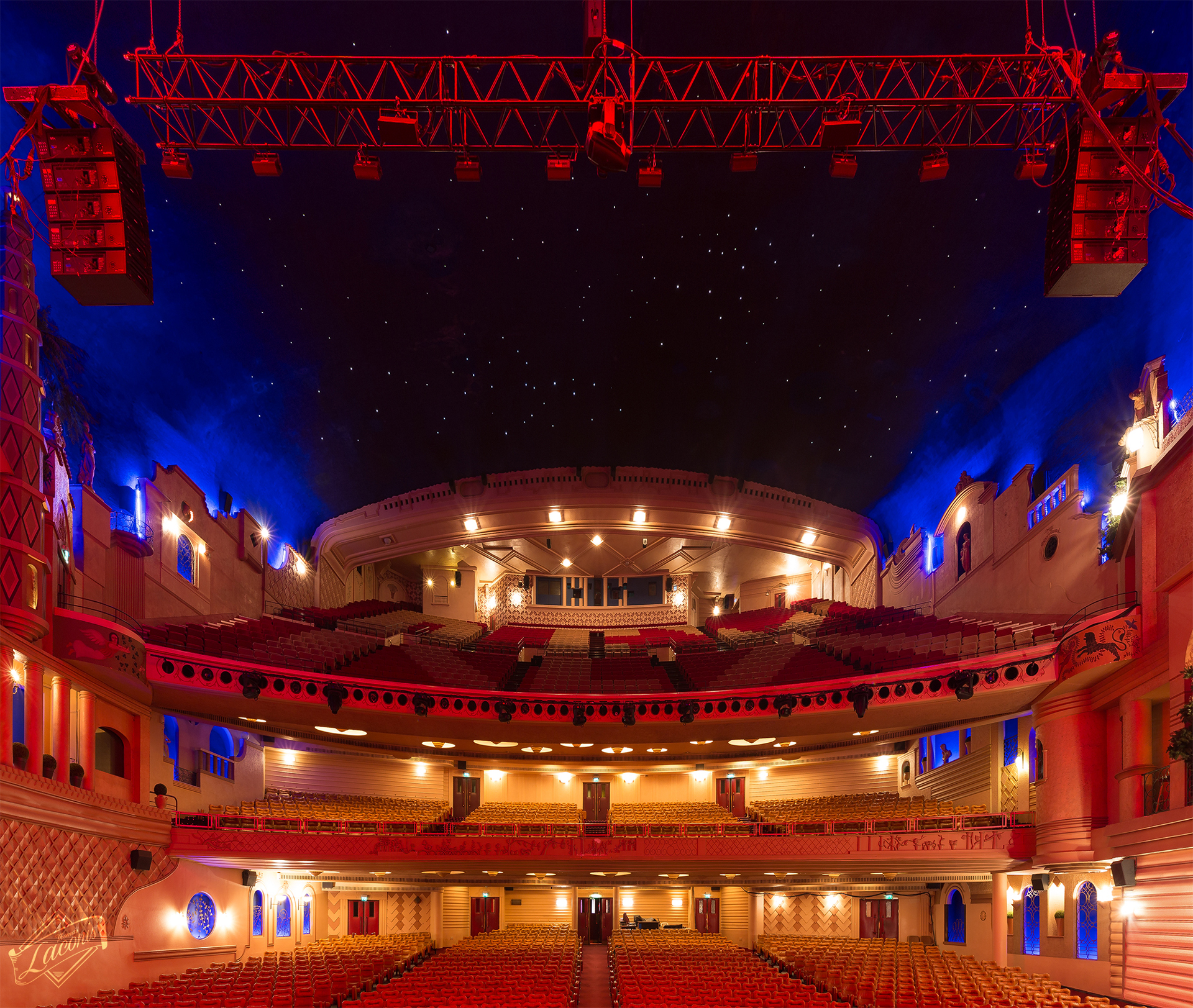
Great hall.

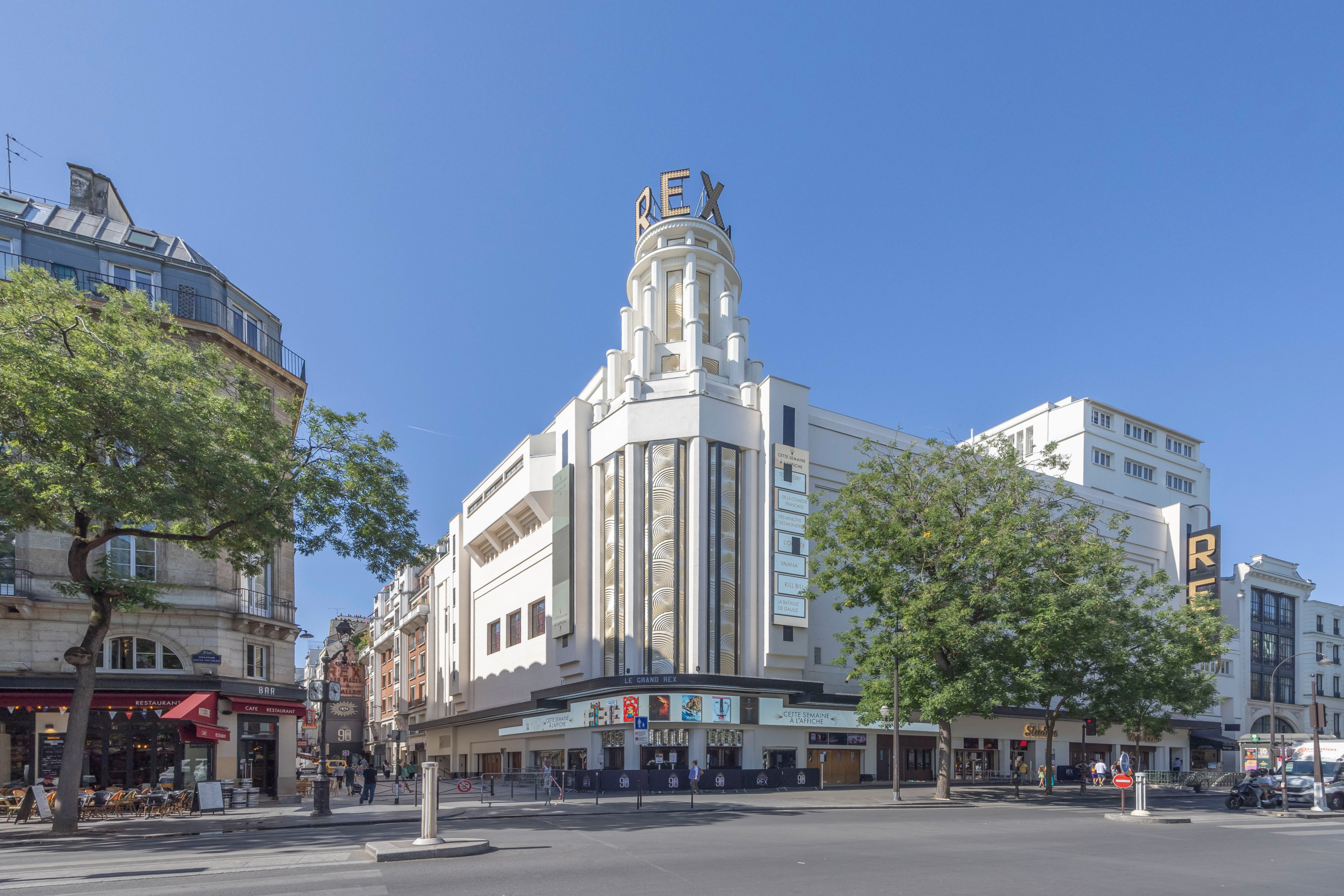

=== Le Grand Large (The Great Large) ===
This screen, one of the biggest in France and which takes up the entire available width of the hall, is hidden in the cinema's ceiling and only comes out for screenings.

The audience is only seated on the 2nd balcony and ends up particularly close to the screen.

Projection: 2 Barco DP32 projectors in 4k.

=== Other halls ===
Since 2017, the Grand Rex has renovated its halls every year.

- Hall 2: 500 seats
- Hall 3: 238 seats called the “Gotham” hall
- Hall 5: 163 seats called the “Matrix” hall
- Hall 4: 122 seats
- Hall 7: 109 seats called the “Tron” hall
- Hall 6: 78 seats called the “Love” hall
The Grand Rex

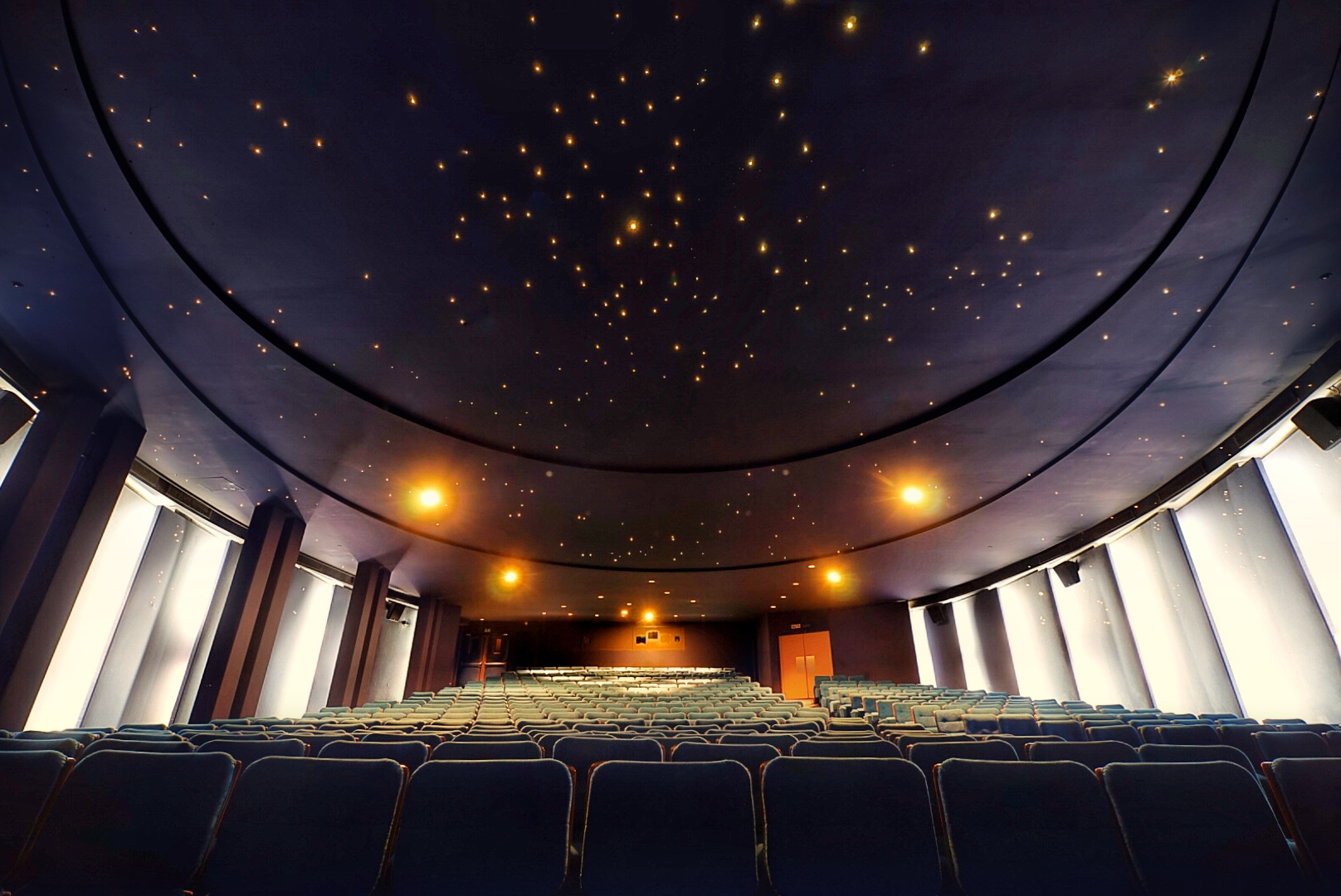
Hall 2

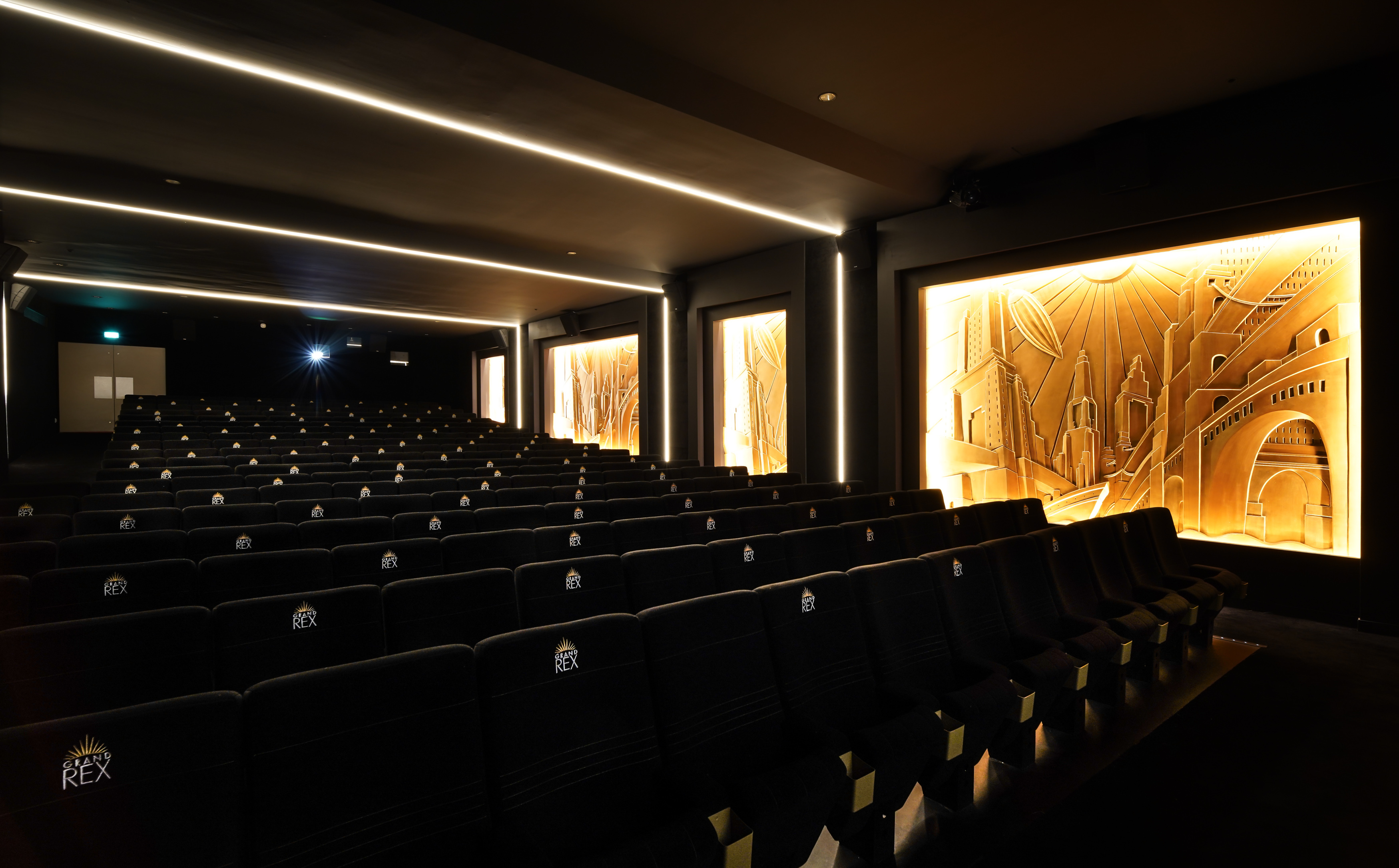
Hall 3

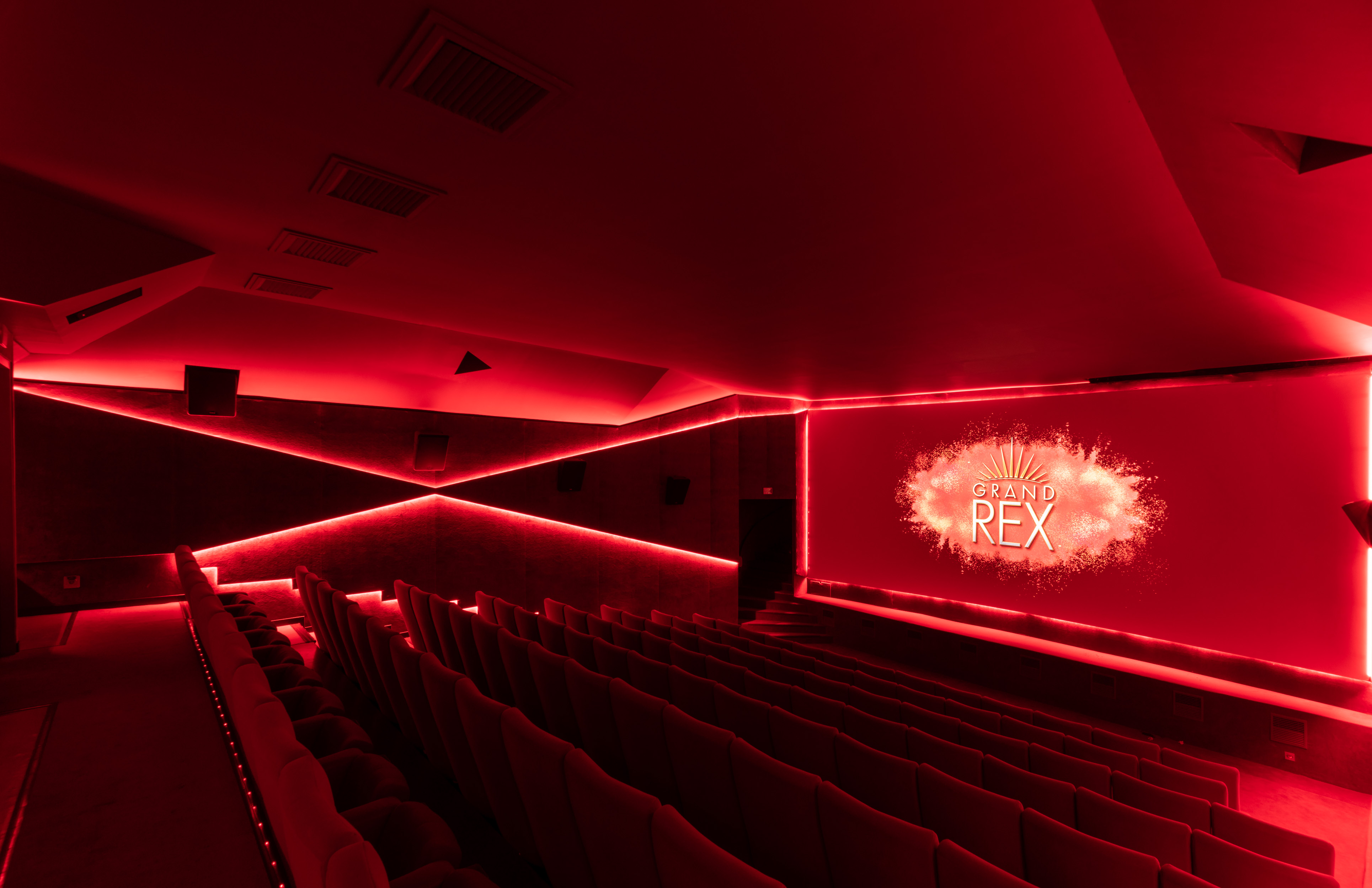
Hall 4

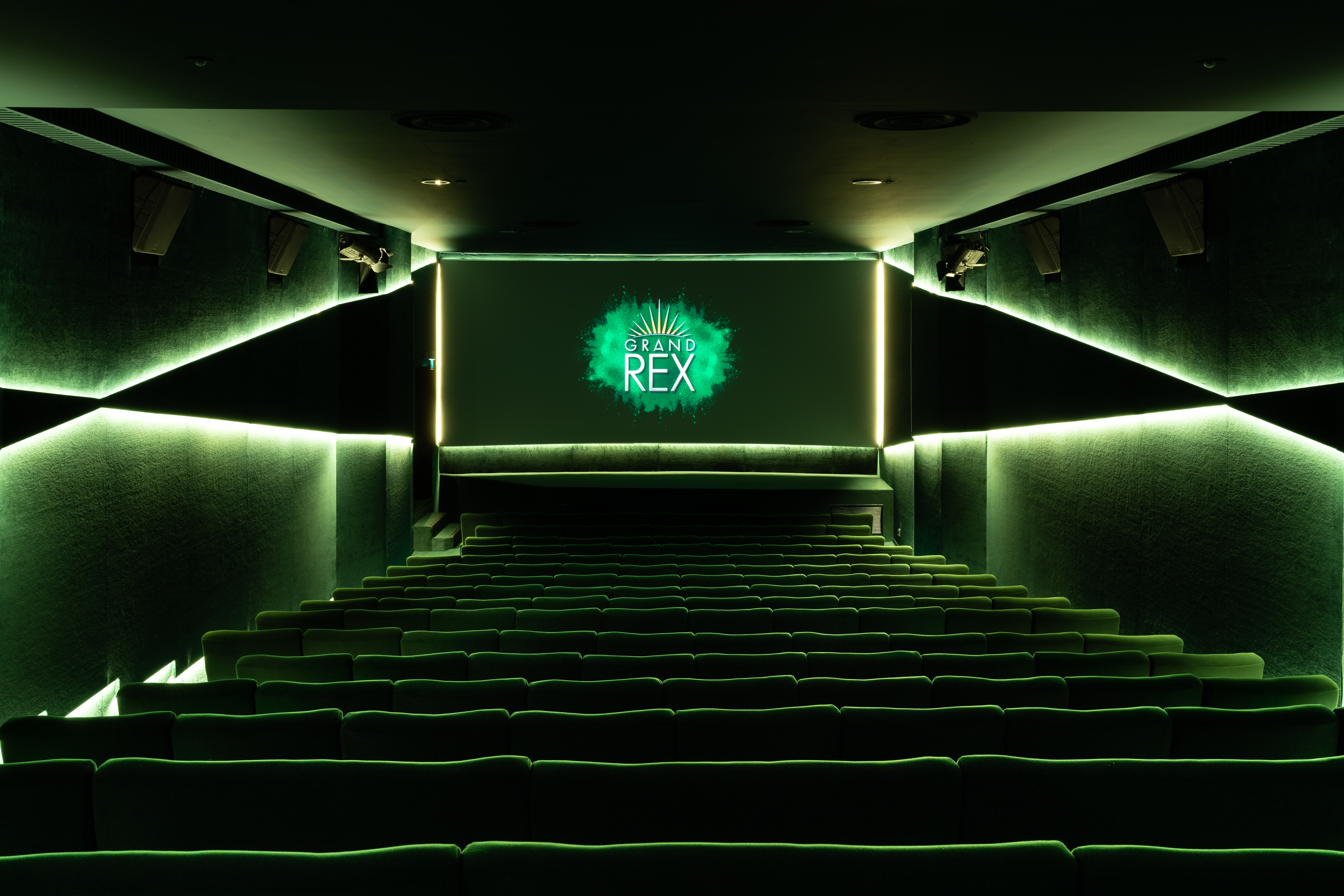
Hall 5

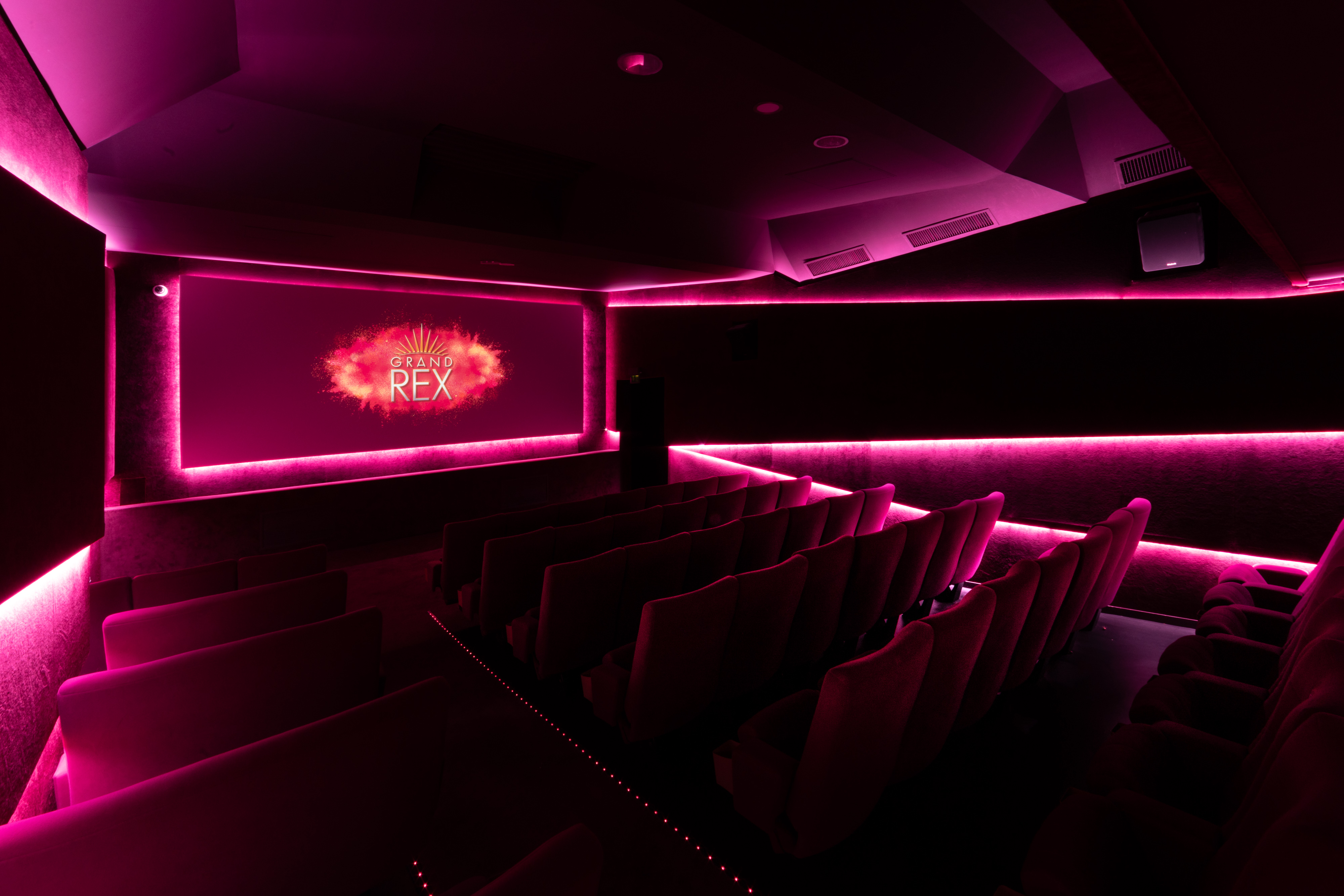
Hall 6

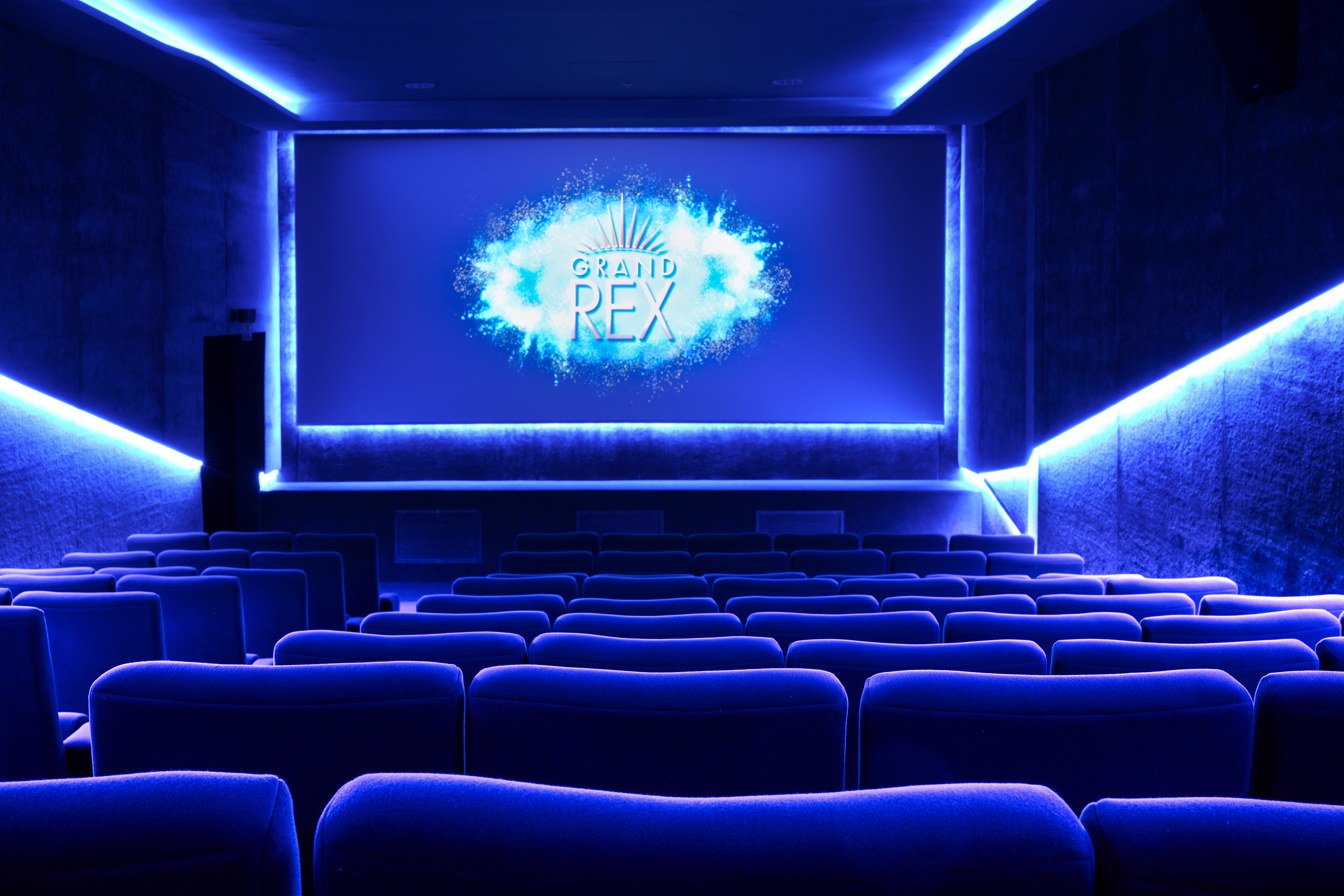
Hall 7

== Rex Studios ==
A 50-minute course is available behind the big screen, backstage and in the technical spaces of the cinema. Initiated by Francois Confino and Philippe Hellmann, it was designed and created by Luc Heripret, in collaboration with the set designer Pascal Mazoyer. The course presents the history of the Grand Rex before diving into the world of the cinema's occupations and special effects in an interactive and playful way: pedestrian and filmed course. The visitor gradually becomes the extra of a shooting before being projected in a film extract, whose recording they will be able to buy.

== Escape game ==
In 2021, the Grand Rex began offering an escape game, which progresses through different rooms representing the main themes of the 7th art.

It was designed and created by Luc Heripret and Team Break within the Rex Studios.

== La Féerie des eaux (Magic waters) ==
Each year, the Christmas Disney cartoon is traditionally screened in the Grand Rex great hall (screen under the arc).

The screening starts two weeks before the French national release.

As the opening act, the audience can attend a sound, light and water show called the Féerie des eaux (Magic waters). A huge pool and 1,200 colored water jets are placed on the stage for this.

== Bibliography ==
- Jean-Michel Frodon; Dina Iordanova; Renaud Olivero (2017). "Le Grand Rex". Cinémas de Paris (in French) (CNRS Editions ed.). Paris. pp. 220–223. ISBN 978-2-271-11480-8.
