= Salto Mortale (1931 French film) =

1931 film directed by Ewald André Dupont

- Directed by: Ewald André Dupont
- Written by: Alfred Machard (novel); Rudolph Cartier; Egon Eis
- Produced by: Pierre Braunberger
- Starring: Gina Manès; Daniel Mendaille; Léon Roger-Maxime
- Cinematography: Friedl Behn-Grund; Akos Farkas
- Edited by: W.L. Bagier; Max Brenner
- Music by: Paul Dessau
- Production companies: Harmonie-Film; Les Établissements Braunberger-Richebé
- Distributed by: Cinélux; Gray Film
- Release date: 31 May 1931
- Running time: 89 minutes
- Countries: France; Germany
- Language: French

Salto Mortale is a 1931 French-German drama film directed by Ewald André Dupont and starring Gina Manès, Daniel Mendaille and Léon Roger-Maxime. It was the French-language version of the German production Salto Mortale.

== Cast ==
- Gina Manès as Marina
- Daniel Mendaille as Jim
- Léon Roger-Maxime as Robby
- Alfred Machard as L'agent de publicité
- François Viguier as Grimby
- Marie-Antoinette Buzet as Une artiste
- Michéle
- André Saint-Germain

== Bibliography ==
- Hans-Michael Bock and Tim Bergfelder. The Concise Cinegraph: An Encyclopedia of German Cinema. Berghahn Books, 2009,
- Crisp, Colin. Genre, Myth and Convention in the French Cinema, 1929-1939. Indiana University Press, 2002.
