= Parisian Life (1936 film) =

- Directed by: Robert Siodmak
- Written by: Katherine Cawdron; Ludovic Halévy (operetta); Anthony Kimmins; Henri Meilhac (operetta); Emeric Pressburger
- Starring: Max Dearly; Conchita Montenegro; Neil Hamilton
- Release date: 1936
- Country: France
- Language: English

Parisian Life is a 1936 French English-language musical film directed by Robert Siodmak and starring Max Dearly, Conchita Montenegro, Neil Hamilton.

== Plot ==
A rich Brazilian, Mendoza, visited Paris in 1900 and was romantically involved with the star of Offenbach's "La Vie Parisienne" which was playing at the time. Thirty five years later, he returns with his son and granddaughter, who is engaged to a young Frenchman.

== Cast ==
- Max Dearly as Don Ramiro de Mendoza
- Conchita Montenegro as Helenita
- Neil Hamilton as Jaques
- Tyrell Davis as Georges
- Eva Moore as Liane
- Carol Goodner as Simone
- Austin Trevor as Don Joao
- Germaine Sablon as The Singer

== Production ==
=== Development ===
It is based on the operetta La Vie parisienne by Ludovic Halévy, Henri Meilhac and Jacques Offenbach. It is the English-language version of the 1936 French film La Vie Parisienne. Such multi-language versions were common during the early years of sound.
