= Alfred Machard =

French writer

- Born: 12 October 1887; Angers, Maine-et-Loire, France
- Died: 2 December 1962 (aged 75); Neuilly-sur-Seine, Hauts-de-Seine, France
- Occupations: Screenwriter, Novelist

Alfred Machard (12 October 1887 – 2 December 1962) was a French screenwriter and novelist. A number of his works have been adapted into films. He co-directed the 1934 film His Other Love. His wife Raymonde Machard was also a noted writer.

== Selected filmography ==
- The Mystery of the Eiffel Tower (1928)
- Queen of the Night (1931)
- La Femme d'une nuit (1931)
- Coquecigrole (1931)
- Salto Mortale (1931, French)
- Salto Mortale (1931, German)
- Haunted People (1932)
- His Other Love (1934)
- Klokslag Twaalf (1936)
- When Midnight Strikes (1936)
- De Man Zonder Hart (1937)
- Facing Destiny (1940)
- The Law of Spring (1942)
- The Lost Woman (1942)
- Tomorrow Is Too Late (1950)
- Trique, gamin de Paris (1962)

== Bibliography ==
- Goble, Alan. The Complete Index to Literary Sources in Film. Walter de Gruyter, 1999.
- Wlaschin, Ken. Silent Mystery and Detective Movies: A Comprehensive Filmography. McFarland, 2009.
